= 2023 Myrtle Beach Bowl =

Postseason college football bowl game

- 4th Myrtle Beach Bowl
Georgia Southern Eagles	Ohio Bobcats
(6–6)	(9–3)
Sun Belt	MAC
21	41
Head coach: Clay Helton	Head coach: Tim Albin
	1	2	3	4	Total
Georgia Southern	0	0	14	7	21
Ohio	3	17	14	7	41
- Date: December 16, 2023
- Season: 2023
- Stadium: Brooks Stadium
- Location: Conway, South Carolina
- MVP: Rickey Hunt Jr. (RB, Ohio)
- Favorite: Georgia Southern by 3.5
- National anthem: Greg Rowles & Festive Brass of Myrtle Beach
- Referee: Patrick Foy (Mountain West)
- Attendance: 8,059

United States TV coverage
- Network: ESPN
- Announcers: Drew Carter (play-by-play), Dustin Fox (analyst), and Stormy Buonantony (sideline)

The 2023 Myrtle Beach Bowl was a college football bowl game played on December 16, 2023, at Brooks Stadium in Conway, South Carolina. The fourth edition of the Myrtle Beach Bowl, the game featured the Georgia Southern Eagles from the Sun Belt Conference and the Ohio Bobcats from the Mid-American Conference (MAC). It began at approximately 11:00 a.m. EST and was televised on ESPN. It was the first of the 2023–24 bowl games concluding the 2023 FBS football season.

The game was originally scheduled for December 18, 2023, but was moved forward by two days to help accommodate a venue move for the 2023 Famous Toastery Bowl.

Ohio's Freshman running back Rickey Hunt Jr. had 115 rushing yards and five total TDs with four of those coming on the ground. That won him the game's MVP and came in the first extended playing time of his career. His 5 TDs tied the record in bowl games and set an Ohio program record. Third-string quarterback Parker Navarro also played well in his first collegiate with start with 11 competitions on 16 attempts for 120 yards and 71 rushing yards. For Georgia Southern, Davis Brin threw for a Myrtle Beach Bowl record 350 yards, bringing his total for the year to 3,781, but his three interceptions and lost fumble provided much of the difference in the game in Ohio's 41–21 victory. Georgia Southern outgained Ohio by 21 yards but Ohio won the turnover battle 5–0, held the Eagles to 1.6 yards per rush attempt, and, with 232 total rushing yards, held the ball for almost seven more minutes. Bryce Houston led the Bobcat defense with eight tackles. Ohio sacked Brin five times.

== Teams ==
The game featured the Georgia Southern Eagles from the Sun Belt Conference against the Ohio Bobcats from the Mid-American Conference (MAC). This was the first time Georgia Southern and Ohio ever played each other, as well as the first time either team played in the Myrtle Beach Bowl.

=== Georgia Southern ===
Behind their senior transfer QB Davis Brin, the Eagles started the year 6–2, with the sole losses coming to James Madison, who went on to finish the season 11–1, and Power Five opponent Wisconsin, a game in which Brin threw five interceptions. However, after clinching bowl eligibility on October 26 with a win over Georgia State, the Eagles were winless in November and finished their regular season with a record of 6–6.

=== Ohio ===
After finishing as the runner-up in the MAC the previous year, the Bobcats returned most of their offensive talent in 2023, including quarterback Kurtis Rourke. After opening the season with a loss to San Diego State, Ohio rattled off five straight wins, including a 10–7 victory over Power Five foe Iowa State. Ohio clinched bowl eligibility with a 20–17 victory over Western Michigan, but missed out on the MAC championship after a 30–16 loss to division winners Miami (OH). The Bobcats finished their regular season with a record of 9–3. After the regular season Ohio took a huge transfer hit as Rourke, starting receivers Miles Cross and Ty Walton, their top two backs Sieh Bangura and O'Shaan Allison, and middle linebacker Keye Thompson all entered the transfer portal.

== Game summary ==
2023 Myrtle Beach Bowl

Quarter	1	2	3	4	Total
Georgia Southern	0	0	14	7	21
Ohio	3	17	14	7	41

at Brooks Stadium • Conway, South Carolina

- Date: Saturday, December 16, 2023
- Game time: 11:00 a.m. EST
- Game weather: Mostly cloudy • Temperature: 63 °F (17 °C)
- Game attendance: 8,059
- Referee: Patrick Foy
- TV announcers (ESPN): Drew Carter (play-by-play), Dustin Fox (analyst), and Stormy Buonantony (sideline)
- Box score

Game information

First Quarter

- (06:27) OHIO – Gianni Spetic 27-yard FG 11 plays, 43 yards, TOP 06:42 (OHIO 3–0)

Second Quarter

- (12:22) OHIO – Ricky Hunt 2-yard run (Gianni Spetic kick) 13 plays, 59 yards, TOP 07:13 (OHIO 10–0)
- (03:16) OHIO – Ricky Hunt 18-yard pass from Parker Navarro (Gianni Spetic kick) 4 plays, 62 yards, TOP 01:53 (OHIO 10–0)
- (00:00) OHIO – Gianni Spetic 26-yard FG 6 plays, 25 yards, TOP 01:07 (OHIO 20–0)

Third Quarter

- (11:46) OHIO – Ricky Hunt 6-yard run (Gianni Spetic kick) 1 play, 6 yards, TOP 00:05 (OHIO 27–0)
- (07:54) GASO – David Mbadinga 3-yard run (Michael Lantz kick) 9 plays, 69 yards, TOP 03:52 (OHIO 27–7)
- (11:46) OHIO – Ricky Hunt 40-yard run (Gianni Spetic kick) 6 plays, 60 yards, TOP 03:19 (OHIO 34–7)
- (01:13) GASO – Derwin Burgess Jr. 65-yard pass from Davis Brin (Michael Lantz kick) 2 plays, 68 yards, TOP 00:51 (OHIO 34–14)

Fourth Quarter

- (12:27) GASO – Jjay Mcafee 15-yard pass from Davis Brin (Michael Lantz kick) 7 plays, 52 yards, TOP 03:46 (OHIO 34–21)
- (02:52) OHIO – Ricky Hunt 9-yard run (Gianni Spetic kick) 8 plays, 55 yards, TOP 03:40 (OHIO 41–21)

== Statistics ==
Team statistical comparison
Statistic	Georgia Southern	Ohio
First downs	15	16
First downs rushing	8	8
First downs passing	6	6
First downs penalty	1	2
Third down efficiency	5–12	10–15
Fourth down efficiency	3–5	0-1
Total plays–net yards	63–383	65–352
Rushing attempts–net yards	21–33	46–232
Yards per rush	1.6	5
Yards passing	350	120
Pass completions–attempts	32–42	11–16
Interceptions thrown	3	0
Punt returns–total yards	0–0	0–0
Kickoff returns–total yards	5-96	1–15
Punts–average yardage	2–36.5	3–38.3
Fumbles–lost	2–2	0–0
Penalties–yards	6–70	6-60
Time of possession	26:42	33:18

Georgia Southern statistics
Eagles passing
	C–A	Yds	TD–INT
Davis Brin	32–42	350	2–3
Eagles rushing
	Car	Yds	TD
David Mbadinga	4	44	1
Dalen Cobb	2	8	0
OJ Arnold	5	6	0
Jalen White	1	–2	0
Davis Brin	9	–23	0
Eagles receiving
	Rec	Yds	TD
Derwin Burgess Jr.	6	117	1
Dalen Cobb	7	109	0
Jjay Mcafee	5	62	1
Khaleb Hood	7	31	0
David Mbadinga	4	20	0
OJ Arnold	2	7	0
Jalen White	1	4	0

Ohio statistics
Bobcats passing
	C–A	Yds	TD–INT
Parker Navarro	11–16	120	1–0
Bobcats rushing
	Car	Yds	TD
Rickey Hunt	17	115	4
Parker Navarro	15	71	0
Nolan McCormick	11	40	0
Will Kacmarek	1	5	0
Sam Wiglusz	1	1	0
Bobcats receiving
	Rec	Yds	TD
Sam Wiglusz	5	64	0
Chase Hendricks	3	25	0
Rickey Hunt	1	18	1
Tyler Foster	1	9	0
Rodney Harris II	1	4	0
