= 2023 Western Michigan Broncos football team =

American college football season

2023 Western Michigan Broncos football
- Conference: Mid-American Conference
- West Division
- Record: 4–8 (3–5 MAC)
- Head coach: Lance Taylor (1st season)
- Offensive coordinator: Billy Cosh (1st season)
- Offensive scheme: Multiple
- Defensive coordinator: Lou Esposito (7th season)
- Base defense: 4–2–5
- Home stadium: Waldo Stadium

2023 Mid-American Conference football standings
	Conf.			Overall
Team	W		L	W		L
East Division
Miami (OH) xy$	7	–	1	11	–	3
Ohio	6	–	2	10	–	3
Bowling Green	5	–	3	7	–	6
Buffalo	3	–	5	3	–	9
Akron	1	–	7	2	–	10
Kent State	0	–	8	1	–	11
West Division
Toledo xy	8	–	0	11	–	3
Northern Illinois	5	–	3	7	–	6
Eastern Michigan	4	–	4	6	–	7
Central Michigan	3	–	5	5	–	7
Ball State	3	–	5	4	–	8
Western Michigan	3	–	5	4	–	8
Championship: Miami (OH) 23, Toledo 14
$ – Conference champion; x – Division champion/co-champions; y – Championship game participant

The 2023 Western Michigan Broncos football team represented Western Michigan University in the 2023 NCAA Division I FBS football season. The Broncos played their home games at Waldo Stadium in Kalamazoo, Michigan, and competed in the West Division of the Mid-American Conference (MAC). They were led by first-year head coach Lance Taylor who was the offensive coordinator for Louisville in 2022. They finished the season 4–8 and 3–5 in conference play The Western Michigan Broncos football team drew an average home attendance of 17,619 in 2023.

== Preseason ==
=== Preseason coaches poll ===
On July 20, the MAC announced the preseason coaches poll. Western Michigan was picked to finish last in the West Division.

== Schedule ==
Date	Time	Opponent	Site	TV	Result	Attendance
August 31	7:00 p.m.	Saint Francis (PA)*	Waldo Stadium; Kalamazoo, MI	ESPN+	W 35–17	19,432
September 9	3:30 p.m.	at Syracuse*	JMA Wireless Dome; Syracuse, NY	ACCNX/ESPN+	L 7–48	32,637
September 16	3:30 p.m.	at No. 25 Iowa*	Kinnick Stadium; Iowa City, IA	BTN	L 10–41	69,250
September 23	1:30 p.m.	at Toledo	Glass Bowl; Toledo, OH	ESPN+	L 31–49	19,068
September 30	3:30 p.m.	Ball State	Waldo Stadium; Kalamazoo, MI	ESPN+	W 42–24	21,880
October 7	12:00 p.m.	at Mississippi State*	Davis Wade Stadium; Starkville, MS	SECN	L 28–41	47,158
October 14	3:30 p.m.	Miami (OH)^{†}	Waldo Stadium; Kalamazoo, MI	ESPN+	L 21–34	20,039
October 21	12:00 p.m.	at Ohio	Peden Stadium; Athens, OH	CBSSN	L 17–20	16,048
October 28	1:00 p.m.	at Eastern Michigan	Rynearson Stadium; Ypsilanti, MI (Michigan MAC Trophy)	ESPN+	W 45–21	16,297
November 7	7:00 p.m.	Central Michigan	Waldo Stadium; Kalamazoo, MI (Michigan MAC Trophy)	ESPNU	W 38–28	17,841
November 14	7:00 p.m.	at Northern Illinois	Huskie Stadium; DeKalb, IL	ESPNU	L 0–24	6,417
November 21	7:00 p.m.	Bowling Green	Waldo Stadium; Kalamazoo, MI	ESPNU	L 10–34	8,901
*Non-conference game; ^{†}Homecoming; Rankings from AP Poll released prior to the game; All times are in Eastern time

== Game summaries ==
=== at Syracuse ===
Game Two – Western Michigan Broncos (1–0) at Syracuse Orange (1–0)

Quarter	1	2	3	4	Total
Broncos	7	0	0	0	7
Orange	17	28	3	0	48

at JMA Wireless Dome • Syracuse, NY

- Date: Saturday, September 9, 2023
- Game time: 3:30 p.m. EDT
- Game weather: Indoor
- Game attendance: 32,637
- Referee: Jeremy Valentine
- TV: ACCNX

Game information

First Quarter

- (14:30) WMU - Jalen Buckley 74 yd run (Palmer Domschke kick) (Drive: 2 plays, 75 yards, 0:30; WMU 7-0)
- (10:55) SYR - Brady Denaburg 36 yd Field Goal (Drive: 13 plays, 54 yards, 3:28; WMU 7-3)
- (8:55) SYR - LeQuint Allen 1 yd run (Brady Denaburg kick) (Drive: 5 plays, 50 yards, 1:18; SYR 10-7)
- (5:03) SYR - Donovan Brown 86 yd pass from Garrett Shrader (Brady Denaburg kick) (Drive: 1 play, 86 yards, 0:18; SYR 17-7)

Second Quarter

- (14:52) SYR – Garrett Shrader 18 yd run (Brady Denaburg kick) (Drive: 9 plays, 65 yards, 2:53; SYR 24–7)
- (10:28) SYR - LeQuint Allen 1 yd run (Brady Denaburg kick) (Drive: 5 plays, 73 yards, 2:17; SYR 31-7)
- (1:19) SYR - LeQuint Allen 2 yd run (Brady Denaburg kick) (Drive: 14 plays, 99 yards, 3:38; SYR 38-7)
- (0:00) SYR - Jason Simmons Jr. 84 yd Interception (Brady Denaburg kick) (SYR 45-7)

Third Quarter

- (2:43) SYR - Brady Denaburg 33 yd Field Goal (Drive: 9 plays, 33 yards, 3:49; SYR 48-7)

Fourth Quarter

No scoring plays

Statistics	WMU	SYR
First downs	15	26
Total yards	318	496
Rush yards	97	153
Passing yards	221	343
Turnovers	1	0
Time of possession	30:57	29:03

Team	Category	Player	Statistics
Western Michigan	Passing	Jack Salopek	15/22, 110 yards, INT
Western Michigan	Rushing	Jalen Buckley	8 carries, 87 yards, TD
Western Michigan	Receiving	Kenneth Womack	4 receptions, 67 yards
Syracuse	Passing	Garrett Shrader	19/30, 286 yards, TD
Syracuse	Rushing	Juwaun Price	16 carries, 68 yards
Syracuse	Receiving	Donovan Brown	3 receptions, 89 yards, TD

=== at No. 25 Iowa ===
Western Michigan at No. 25 Iowa

Team	1	2	3	4	Total
Broncos	7	3	0	0	10
• No. 25 Hawkeyes	0	14	17	10	41

- Date: September 16
- Location:
  Kinnick Stadium
  Iowa City, IA
- Game start: 2:40 p.m. CDT
- Elapsed time: 3:51
- Game attendance: 69,250
- Game weather: 78 °F (26 °C), Cloudy, Wind NW 6 mph (9.7 km/h)
- Referee: Gregory Blum
- TV announcers (BTN): Lisa Byington (play-by-play), Anthony Herron (analyst), and Shane Sparks (sidelines)
- Source: Box Score

Scoring summary
1	5:40	WMU	Anthony Sambucci 64-yard pass from Treyson Bourguet (Palmer Domschke kick)	WMU 7–0
2	8:26	Iowa	Diante Vines 3-yard pass from Cade McNamara (Drew Stevens kick)	Tied 7–7
2	4:45	WMU	Palmer Domschke 27-yard field goal	WMU 10–7
2	1:29	Iowa	Leshon Williams 25-yard pass from Cade McNamara (Drew Stevens kick)	Iowa 14–10
3	7:30	Iowa	Safety, blocked punt through the end zone	Iowa 16–10
3	4:02	Iowa	Kamari Moulton 3-yard run (Erick All pass from Cade McNamara)	Iowa 24–10
3	2:10	Iowa	Kamari Moulton 1-yard run (Drew Stevens kick)	Iowa 31–10
4	5:20	Iowa	Drew Stevens 31-yard field goal	Iowa 34–10
4	0:30	Iowa	Max White 2-yard run (Drew Stevens kick)	Iowa 41–10

Statistics	WMU	IOWA
First downs	8	19
Total yards	239	387
Rushing yards	117	254
Passing yards	122	133
Turnovers	1	2
Time of possession	26:07	33:53

Team	Category	Player	Statistics
Western Michigan	Passing	Treyson Bourguet	5/16, 124 yards, TD
Western Michigan	Rushing	Treyson Bourguet	8 carries, 32 yards
Western Michigan	Receiving	Kenneth Womack	2 receptions, 11 yards
Iowa	Passing	Cade McNamara	9/19, 103 yards, 2 TD, 2 INT
Iowa	Rushing	Leshon Williams	12 carries, 145 yards
Iowa	Receiving	Steven Stilianos	2 receptions, 29 yards

=== Ball State ===
Game Five – Ball State Cardinals (1–3) at Western Michigan Broncos (1–3) – Game summary

Quarter	1	2	3	4	Total
Ball State	3	7	7	7	24
Western Michigan	7	21	7	7	42

at Waldo Stadium • Kalamazoo, MI

- Date: Saturday, September 30, 2023
- Game time: 3:30 p.m. EST
- Game weather: -
- Game attendance: 21,880
- TV: ESPN+

Game information

First quarter

- (8:37) BALL – Jackson Courville 27-yard field goal (Drive: 10 plays, 70 yards, 4:25; Ball State 3–0)
- (5:06) WMU – Anthony Sambucci 18-yard pass from Treyson Bourguet (Palmer Domschke kick) (Drive: 7 plays, 75 yards, 3:31; Western Michigan 7–3)

Second quarter

- (13:06) WMU – Zahir Abdus-Salaam 1-yard run (Palmer Domschke kick) (Drive: 10 plays, 92 yards, 3:57; Western Michigan 14–3)
- (7:50) WMU – Jalen Buckley 12-yard run (Palmer Domschke kick) (Drive: 7 plays, 43 yards, 2:29; Western Michigan 21–3)
- (5:04) BALL – Maximus Webster 2-yard pass from Layne Hatcher (Jackson Courville kick) (Drive: 6 plays, 73 yards, 2:45; Western Michigan 21–10)
- (0:01) WMU – Anthony Sambucci 2-yard pass from Treyson Bourguet (Palmer Domschke kick) (Drive: 10 plays, 59 yards, 1:27; Western Michigan 28–10)

Third quarter

- (11:52) BALL – Qian Magwood 32-yard pass from Layne Hatcher (Jackson Courville kick) (Drive: 6 plays, 75 yards, 3:08; Western Michigan 28–17)
- (10:14) WMU – Anthony Sambucci 31-yard pass from Treyson Bourguet (Palmer Domschke kick) (Drive: 5 plays, 75 yards, 1:38; Western Michigan 35–17)

Fourth quarter

- (14:15) BALL – Ahmad Edwards 57-yard pass from Layne Hatcher (Jackson Courville kick) (Drive: 4 plays, 69 yards, 1:38; Western Michigan 35–24)
- (8:53) WMU – Zahir Abdus-Salaam 2-yard run (Palmer Domschke kick) (Drive: 6 plays, 85 yards, 3:22; Western Michigan 42–24)

Statistics	BALL	WMU
First downs	19	26
Total yards	63–364	75–461
Rushing yards	26–48	36–133
Passing yards	316	328
Passing: Comp–Att–Int	26–37–0	24–39–0
Time of possession	29:37	30:23

Team	Category	Player	Statistics
Ball State	Passing	Layne Hatcher	26/37, 316 yards, 3 TD
Ball State	Rushing	Marquez Cooper	15 carries, 82 yards
Ball State	Receiving	Qian Magwood	9 receptions, 110 yards, TD
Western Michigan	Passing	Treyson Bourguet	24/39, 328 yards, 3 TD
Western Michigan	Rushing	Zahir Abdus-Salaam	8 carries, 53 yards, 2 TD
Western Michigan	Receiving	Anthony Sambucci	5 receptions, 73 yards, 3 TD

=== at Mississippi State ===
Game Six – Western Michigan Broncos (2-3) at Mississippi State Bulldogs (2–3) – Game summary

Quarter	1	2	3	4	Total
Western Michigan	0	7	14	7	28
Mississippi State	10	7	14	10	41

at Davis Wade Stadium • Starkville, MS

- Date: Saturday, October 7, 2023
- Game time: 11:00 a.m. CST
- Game weather: Sunny, 62 °F (17 °C)
- Game attendance: 47,158
- Referee: Scott Walker
- TV announcers (SECN/ESPN+): Lowell Galindo (play-by-play), Derek Mason (analyst), Taylor Davis (sideline)

Game information

First quarter

- (10:09) MSST – Kyle Ferrie 31-yard field goal (Drive: 7 plays, 34 yards, 2:45; Mississippi State 3-0)
- (6:04) MSST – Jordan Mosley 15-yard pass from Will Rogers (Kyle Ferrie kick) (Drive: 5 plays, 54 yards, 2:30; Mississippi State 10-0)

Second quarter

- (4:03) MSST – Creed Whittemore 16-yard pass from Will Rogers (Kyle Ferrie kick) (Drive: 6 plays, 53 yards, 3:03; Mississippi State 17-0)
- (0:52) WMU – Austin Hence 10-yard pass from Hayden Wolff (Palmer Dornschke kick) (Drive: 14 plays, 75 yards, 3:11; Mississippi State 17-7)

Third quarter

- (12:18) MSST – Mike Wright 3-yard run (Kyle Ferrie kick) (Drive: 7 plays, 61 yards, 2:41; Mississippi State 24-7)
- (8:57) WMU – Blake Bosma 23-yard pass from Hayden Wolff (Palmer Dornschke kick) (Drive: 10 plays, 75 yards, 3:21; Mississippi State 24-14)
- (6:44) MSST – Seth Davis 5-yard run (Nick Barr-Mira kick) (Drive: 5 plays, 51 yards, 2:12; Mississippi State 31-14)
- (3:23) WMU – Zahir Abdus-Salaam 11-yard run (Palmer Dornschke kick) (Drive: 9 plays, 75 yards, 3:21; Mississippi State 31-21)

Fourth quarter

- (12:31) MSST – Freddie Roberson 36-yard pass from Will Rogers (Nick Barr-Mira kick) (Drive: 5 plays, 59 yards, 1:44; Mississippi State 38-21)
- (10:48) WMU – Leroy Thomas 25-yard pass from Hayden Wolff (Palmer Dornschke kick) (Drive: 5 plays, 75 yards, 1:43; Mississippi State 38-28)
- (4:12) MSST – Nick Barr-Mira 49-yard field goal (Drive: 6 plays, 26 yards, 2:07; Mississippi State 41-28)

Statistics	WMU	MSST
First downs	21	25
Total yards	77–413	65–440
Rushing yards	32–116	33–194
Passing yards	297	246
Passing: Comp–Att–Int	33–45–1	23–32–0
Time of possession	28:46	31:14

Team	Category	Player	Statistics
Western Michigan	Passing	Hayden Wolff	27/35, 262 yards, 3 TD, INT
Western Michigan	Rushing	Zahir Abdus-Salaam	18 carries, 60 yards, TD
Western Michigan	Receiving	Kenneth Womack	12 receptions, 113 yards
Mississippi State	Passing	Will Rogers	16/22, 189 yards, 3 TD
Mississippi State	Rushing	Seth Davis	10 carries, 65 yards, TD
Mississippi State	Receiving	Freddie Roberson	5 receptions, 68 yards, TD

=== at Ohio ===
Western Michigan Broncos (2–5) vs. Ohio Bobcats (5–2)

Quarter	1	2	3	4	Total
Western Michigan	0	0	10	7	17
Ohio	3	3	7	7	20

at Peden Stadium • Athens, OH

- Date: Saturday, October 21, 2023
- Game time: 12:00 p.m. EDT
- Game weather: sunny
- Game attendance: 16,048
- Referee: William Williams
- TV announcers (CBSSN): Jason Knapp, Russ Tucker
- boxscore

Game information

First Quarter

- (08:49) OHIO - Gianni Spetic 28 yd FG 13 plays, 57 yards, TOP 04:51 (OHIO 3–0)

Second Quarter

- (00:02) OHIO - Gianni Spetic 19 yd FG 6 plays, 80 yards, TOP 00:37 (OHIO 6–0)

Third Quarter

- (07:07) WMU - Palmer Domschk 43 yd FG 6 plays, 52 yards, TOP 02:29 (OHIO 6–3)
- (02:36) OHIO - Sieh Bangura 1 yd run (Gianni Spetic kick) 9 plays, 75 yards, TOP 04:31 (OHIO 13–3)
- (00:18) WMU - Hayden Wolff 3 yd run (Palmer Domschk kick) 5 plays, 41 yards, TOP 02:07 (OHIO 13–10)

Fourth Quarter

- (04:36) OHIO - Sam Wiglusz 7 yd pass from Kurtis Rourke (Gianni Spetic kick) 8 plays, 78 yards, TOP 05:05 (OHIO 20–10)
- (00:18) WMU - Kenneth Womack 8 yd pass from Hayden Wolff (Palmer Domschke Kick) 8 plays, 68 yards, TOP 02:09 (OHIO 20–17)

Statistics	Western Michigan	Ohio
First downs	21	28
Total yards	369	460
Rushes/yards	22/79	39/185
Passing yards	290	275
Passing: Comp–Att–Int	30–42–1	24–39–0
Time of possession	24:25	35:35

Team	Category	Player	Statistics
Western Michigan	Passing	Hayden Wolff	30/42, 290 yards, 1 TD, 1 INT
Western Michigan	Rushing	CJ Hester	5 rushes, 26 yards
Western Michigan	Receiving	Kenneth Womack	14 receptions, 90 yards, 1 TD
Ohio	Passing	Kurtis Rourke	24/39, 275 yards, 1 TD
Ohio	Rushing	Sieh Bangura	15 rushes, 86 yards, 1 TD
Ohio	Receiving	Sam Wiglusz	10 receptions, 155 yards, 1 TD

=== Bowling Green ===
Game Twelve – Bowling Green Falcons (6-5) at Western Michigan Broncos (4-7) – Game summary

Quarter	1	2	3	4	Total
Bowling Green	10	21	3	0	34
Western Michigan	0	3	0	7	10

at Waldo Stadium • Kalamazoo, MI

- Date: Tuesday, November 21, 2023
- Game time: 7:00 p.m. EDT
- Game weather: Cloudy, 40 °F (4 °C) • Wind: NW 9 mph (14 km/h)
- Game attendance: 8,901
- Referee: Greg Sujack
- TV announcers (ESPNU): Connor Onion, Aaron Murray

Game information

First quarter

- (12:04) BGSU – Alan Anaya 35-yard field goal (Drive: 7 plays, 58 yards, 2:56; Bowling Green 3-0)
- (10:55) BGSU – Jaylon Tillman 35-yard pass from Connor Bazelak (Alan Anaya kick) (Drive: 1 play, 34 yards, :07; Bowling Green 10-0)

Second quarter

- (13:54) BGSU – Jordan Oladokun 53-yard interception return (Alan Anaya kick) (Bowling Green 17-0)
- (07:12) BGSU – Odieu Hiliare 3-yard pass from Connor Bazelak (Drive: 5 plays, 43 yards, 2:21; Bowling Green 24-0)
- (00:57) BGSU – Ta'ron Keith 7-yard run (Drive: 9 plays, 68 yards, 4:28; Bowling Green 31-0)
- (00:00) WMU – Palmer Domschke 48-yard field goal (Drive: 8 plays, 45 yards, :57; Bowling Green 31-3)

Third quarter

- (08:59) BGSU – Alan Anaya 25-yard field goal (Drive: 9 plays, 26 yards, 3:55; Bowling Green 34-3)

Fourth quarter

- (04:44) WMU – Jalen Buckley 16-yard run (Palmer Domschke kick) (Drive:15 plays, 80 yards, 9:24; Bowling Green 34-10)

Statistics	Bowling Green	Western Michigan
First downs	21	16
Plays–yards	360	258
Rushes–yards	28–132	41–135
Passing yards	228	123
Passing: comp–att–int	19–28–1	17–27–2
Turnovers		
Time of possession	29:09	30:51

Team	Category	Player	Statistics
Bowling Green	Passing	Connor Bazelak	18/26, 217 yards, 2 TDS
Bowling Green	Rushing	Ta'ron Keith	13 carries, 66 yards, 1 TD
Bowling Green	Receiving	Harold Fannin Jr.	8 receptions, 99 yards
Western Michigan	Passing	Hayden Wolff	17/27, 123 yards, 2 INTS
Western Michigan	Rushing	Jalen Buckley	18 carries, 85 yards, 1 TD
Western Michigan	Receiving	Kenneth Womack	8 receptions, 44 yards

== NFL draft ==
The NFL draft was held at Campus Martius Park in Detroit, Michigan, on April 25–27, 2024. Additionally Keni'h Lovely signed with the Buffalo Bills as an undrafted free agent.

Broncos who were picked in the 2024 NFL Draft:

Round	Pick	Player	Position	NFL team
2	56	Marshawn Kneeland	DE	Dallas Cowboys
