= 2023 Ohio Bobcats football team =

American college football season

2023 Ohio Bobcats football

Myrtle Beach Bowl champion

Myrtle Beach Bowl, W 41–21 vs. Georgia Southern
- Conference: Mid-American Conference
- East Division
- Record: 10–3 (6–2 MAC)
- Head coach: Tim Albin (3rd season)
- Co-offensive coordinators: Scott Isphording (3rd season); Allen Rudolph (3rd season)
- Offensive scheme: Spread option
- Defensive coordinator: Spence Nowinsky (2nd season)
- Base defense: 4–2–5
- Captains: Bryce Houston; Rodney Mathews; Kurtis Rourke; Keye Thompson; Sam Wiglusz
- Home stadium: Peden Stadium

2023 Mid-American Conference football standings
	Conf.			Overall
Team	W		L	W		L
East Division
Miami (OH) xy$	7	–	1	11	–	3
Ohio	6	–	2	10	–	3
Bowling Green	5	–	3	7	–	6
Buffalo	3	–	5	3	–	9
Akron	1	–	7	2	–	10
Kent State	0	–	8	1	–	11
West Division
Toledo xy	8	–	0	11	–	3
Northern Illinois	5	–	3	7	–	6
Eastern Michigan	4	–	4	6	–	7
Central Michigan	3	–	5	5	–	7
Ball State	3	–	5	4	–	8
Western Michigan	3	–	5	4	–	8
Championship: Miami (OH) 23, Toledo 14
$ – Conference champion; x – Division champion/co-champions; y – Championship game participant

The 2023 Ohio Bobcats football team represented Ohio University as a member of the East Division of the Mid-American Conference (MAC) in the 2023 NCAA Division I FBS football season. They were led by third-year head coach Tim Albin and played their home games at Peden Stadium in Athens, Ohio. The Bobcats drew an average home attendance of 19,005 in 2023.

Ohio entered the season coming off of their first 10 win season since 2011 as the defending division champion and favorite to repeat in the MAC East and the second favorite to Toledo to win the conference. Ohio entered the season returning 9 of 11 starters from the highest scoring offense in the MAC including the defending conference player of the year in quarterback Kurtis Rourke who was returning from a torn ACL that he suffered in the eleventh game of the previous season against Ball State.

Ohio finished non-conference play with a record of 3–1. Rourke was not cleared to play until the Monday before the Week Zero game with San Diego State. He suffered an undisclosed injury and was removed from the game in the first quarter. The Bobcat offense struggled in a 20–13 loss. C.J. Harris and Parker Navarro split time at quarterback in a win against Long Island. Ohio's running game held the ball for over 37 minutes. The following week, Ohio kept the ball on the ground 45 times in a 17–10 win at Florida Atlantic. Iowa State came to Peden Stadium where both offenses struggled in a game that featured 11 punts. The Bobcat's offense was unproductive but almost mistake free and held the ball for over 35 minutes. The Bobcat defense, led by Bryce Houston's 15 tackles, forced some key mistakes that made the difference in a 10–7 victory.

Ohio opened conference play with a 38–7 over Bowling Green. Ohio's defense again ruled the day forcing four turnovers and scoring two touchdowns. Rourke was 14 of 16 with three touchdown passes. For their Homecoming, they opened up their offense in a 42–17 win over Kent State. Rourke threw for 300 yards and 3 touchdowns of which 125 yards and 2 touchdowns had Miles Cross on the receiving end. The Bobcat's five game winning streak was snapped the following week with a 23–13 loss on a windy day at Northern Illinois. The Bobcat offense had 460 yards against Western Michigan without a turnover but only managed to score 20 points as Ohio held on to win by 3. Ohio dropped out of a first place tie in a 30–16 home rivalry loss to Miami the following week. They rebounded with a 20–10 win over Buffalo in their first midweek game of the season. Ohio completed their home schedule with a 34–20 win over Central Michigan but were eliminated from MAC contention when Miami won on the same night. The Bobcats fell behind Akron in the season finale but outscored the Zips 22–0 in the second half to finish MAC Play at 6–2 and finished the regular season 9–3 overall for the second straight season. Ohio's defense led their way for much of the year with the fifth best scoring defense in the FBS at 15.4 points per game, while allowing 96 rushing yards (8th) and 168 passing yards (7th) per game. Ohio accepted a bid to play Georgia Southern in the Myrtle Beach Bowl. Prior to the game Ohio's offense took a huge hit as Rourke, starting receivers Miles Cross and Ty Walton, and their top two backs Sieh Bangura and O'Shaan Allison all entered the transfer portal. It mattered little as the Bobcats scored 41 points with the aid of five forced turnovers by the defense to cruise to a 41–21 victory. Freshman Rickey Hunt set an Ohio program record and tied the record for touchdowns in bowl games by finding the endzone five times. He was named the game's MVP. It was Ohio's second straight 10 win season.

== Offseason ==
Positions key
Offense	Defense	Special teams
QB — Quarterback; RB — Running back; FB — Fullback; WR — Wide receiver; TE — Tight end; OL — Offensive lineman; T — Tackle; G — Guard; C — Center	DL — Defensive lineman; DT — Defensive tackle (Note: Includes nose tackle (NT)); DE — Defensive end; EDGE — Edge rusher; LB — Linebacker (Note: Includes middle linebacker (MLB/MIKE), weakside linebacker (WILL), strongside linebacker (SAM), off-ball linebacker, and outside linebacker (OLB)); DB — Defensive back; CB — Cornerback; S — Safety (Note: Includes free safety (FS) and strong safety (SS))	K — Kicker (Note: Also known as a placekicker (PK)); P — Punter; LS — Long snapper; RS — Return specialist (Note: Includes kickoff and punt returners)

=== Transfers ===
==== Outgoing ====
Player	Position	Destination
Cannon Blauser	LB	South Dakota
Jamison Collier	ATH	East Tennessee State
Tyler Mullins	S	UT Martin
Nathanial Vakos	K	Wisconsin
Kyle Kelly	LB	Eastern Kentucky
Denzel Daxon	DL	Illinois
Nigel Drummond	WR	
CJ Hankins	LB	Siena Heights University
Kylen McCracken	DT	Marshall
Kadin Beler	QB	
Jeremiah Burton	DL	Slippery Rock
Vance Van Every	OL	UT Martin

==== Incoming ====
Player	Position	Transferred From
Walter Reynolds	S	Holy Cross
Jack Keneally	TE	Youngstown State
Christian Hilton	WR	Citadel
Dane Jackson	OL	North Texas
Kaci Seegars	LB	Liberty
Tristan Cox	DE/LB	Purdue
Jared Wheatley	P/K	Vanderbilt
Miles Fleming	CB	Minnesota
Kwame Sutton	DL	Austin Peay
Ches Jackson	OT	Colorado State

=== Recruiting class ===
College recruiting
Name	Hometown	School	Height	Weight	Commit date
Chase Hendricks; WR	Saint Louis, Missouri	St. Mary's	5 ft 11 in (1.80 m)	185 lb (84 kg)	
Chase Hendricks; WR	Recruit ratings: Rivals: 247Sports: ESPN:				
Rickey Hunt Jr. RB	Oklahoma City, Oklahoma	Millwood	5 ft 10 in (1.78 m)	180 lb (82 kg)	
Rickey Hunt Jr. RB	Recruit ratings: Rivals: 247Sports: ESPN:				
Kobi Gorman; DL	Pickerington, Ohio	Pickerington Central	6 ft 3 in (1.91 m)	265 lb (120 kg)	
Kobi Gorman; DL	Recruit ratings: Rivals: 247Sports: ESPN:				
Andrew Marshall; LB	Carroll, Ohio	Bloom Carroll	6 ft 3 in (1.91 m)	220 lb (100 kg)	
Andrew Marshall; LB	Recruit ratings: Rivals: 247Sports:				
Byron Pearson; CB	Senatobia, Mississippi	Northwest Central Community College	5 ft 9 in (1.75 m)	175 lb (79 kg)	
Byron Pearson; CB	Recruit ratings: Rivals: 247Sports:				
Mason Williams; TE	Mogadore, Ohio	Mogadore	6 ft 4 in (1.93 m)	235 lb (107 kg)	
Mason Williams; TE	Recruit ratings: Rivals: 247Sports:				
Jayvian Crable; ATH	Akron, Ohio	Archbishop Hoban	6 ft 3 in (1.91 m)	200 lb (91 kg)	
Jayvian Crable; ATH	Recruit ratings: Rivals: 247Sports:				
Kendall Bannister; CB	Woodbridge, Virginia	Freedom	5 ft 10 in (1.78 m)	165 lb (75 kg)	
Kendall Bannister; CB	Recruit ratings: Rivals: 247Sports:				
Jacob Winters; QB	Jackson, Ohio	Jackson	6 ft 2 in (1.88 m)	215 lb (98 kg)	
Jacob Winters; QB	Recruit ratings: Rivals: 247Sports: ESPN:				
Desmond Duffy; WR	Carmel, Indiana	Carmel	5 ft 8 in (1.73 m)	173 lb (78 kg)	
Desmond Duffy; WR	Recruit ratings: Rivals: 247Sports: ESPN:				
Danny Novickas; Edge	Chicago, Illinois	Mount Carmel	6 ft 3 in (1.91 m)	205 lb (93 kg)	
Danny Novickas; Edge	Recruit ratings: Rivals: 247Sports:				
Gianni Spetic; K	Chardon, Ohio	Notre Dame-Cathedral Latin School	6 ft 1 in (1.85 m)	190 lb (86 kg)	
Gianni Spetic; K	Recruit ratings: Rivals: 247Sports:				
Owen DiFranco; Edge	Glen Ellyn, Illinois	Glenbard South	6 ft 4 in (1.93 m)	210 lb (95 kg)	
Owen DiFranco; Edge	Recruit ratings: Rivals: 247Sports:				
Aiden Johnson; OT	Olney, Maryland	Our Lady Good Counsel	6 ft 3 in (1.91 m)	300 lb (140 kg)	
Aiden Johnson; OT	Recruit ratings: Rivals: 247Sports:				
Jalen Thomeson; ATH	Greenwood, Indiana	Center Grove	5 ft 11 in (1.80 m)	180 lb (82 kg)	
Jalen Thomeson; ATH	Recruit ratings: Rivals: 247Sports:				
Donovan Walker; S	Aliquippa, Pennsylvania	Aliquippa	6 ft 1 in (1.85 m)	165 lb (75 kg)	
Donovan Walker; S	Recruit ratings: Rivals:				
Brady Sestili; LB	Dublin, Ohio	Dublin Jerome	6 ft 3 in (1.91 m)	200 lb (91 kg)	
Brady Sestili; LB	Recruit ratings: Rivals:				
RJ Keuchler; DE	Pickerington, Ohio	Pickerington Central	6 ft 3 in (1.91 m)	200 lb (91 kg)	
RJ Keuchler; DE	Recruit ratings: No ratings found				
Jailen Hammer; WR	Oroville, California	Butte College	6 ft 0 in (1.83 m)	190 lb (86 kg)	
Jailen Hammer; WR	Recruit ratings: No ratings found				
Overall recruit ranking:
‡ Refers to 40-yard dash; Note: In many cases, Scout, Rivals, 247Sports, On3, and ESPN may conflict in their listings of height, weight and 40 time.; In these cases, the average was taken. ESPN grades are on a 100-point scale.; Sources: "Rivals commits". Rivals.; "ESPN commits". ESPN.; "2024 Team Ranking". Rivals.com.; "247Sports commits". 247Sports.

== Preseason ==
=== Preseason polls ===
==== Coaches Poll ====
On July 20 the MAC announced the preseason coaches poll. Ohio was picked to finish first in the East. They received four votes to win conference which was second only to defending champion and West favorite Toledo.

East
Predicted finish	Team	Votes (1st place)
1	Ohio	63 (9)
2	Miami	52 (2)
3	Buffalo	51 (1)
4	Bowling Green	35
5	Akron	26
6	Kent State	19

West
Predicted finish	Team	Votes (1st place)
1	Toledo	66 (11)
2	Eastern Michigan	55 (1)
3	Northern Illinois	38
4	Central Michigan	37
5	Ball State	27
6	Western Michigan	23

Coaches poll (MAC Championship)
Rank	Team	Votes
1	Toledo	7
2	Ohio	4
3	Buffalo	1

=== Preseason Award watch lists ===
Award	Player	Position	Year
Maxwell Award	Kurtis Rourke	QB	Gr.
Davey O'Brien Award	Kurtis Rourke	QB	Gr.
Biletnikoff Award	Sam Wiglusz	WR	Gr.
Doak Walker Award	Sieh Bangura	RB	R-So.
Walter Camp Award	Kurtis Rourke	QB	Gr.
Manning Award	Kurtis Rourke	QB	Gr.
Johnny Unitas Golden Arm Award	Kurtis Rourke	QB	Gr.
Comeback Player of the Year Award	O'Shaan Allison	RB	R-5th
William V. Campbell Trophy	Bryce Houston	LB	Gr.

== Schedule ==
Date	Time	Opponent	Site	TV	Result	Attendance	Source
August 26	7:00 p.m.	at San Diego State*	Snapdragon Stadium; San Diego, CA	FS1	L 13–20	23,867	
September 2	12:00 p.m.	LIU*	Peden Stadium; Athens, OH	ESPN+	W 27–10	18,453	
September 9	6:00 p.m.	at Florida Atlantic*	FAU Stadium; Boca Raton, FL	ESPN+	W 17–10	17,934	
September 16	12:00 p.m.	Iowa State*	Peden Stadium; Athens, OH	ESPNU	W 10–7	21,991	
September 23	3:30 p.m.	at Bowling Green	Doyt Perry Stadium; Bowling Green, OH	ESPN+	W 38–7	18,248	
October 7	3:30 p.m.	Kent State^{†}	Peden Stadium; Athens, OH	ESPN+	W 42–17	22,945	
October 14	4:00 p.m.	at Northern Illinois	Huskie Stadium; DeKalb, IL	ESPNU	L 13–23	11,143	
October 21	12:00 p.m.	Western Michigan	Peden Stadium; Athens, OH	CBSSN	W 20–17	16,048	
October 28	3:30 p.m.	Miami (OH)	Peden Stadium; Athens, OH (Battle of the Bricks)	CBSSN	L 16–30	19,854	
November 7	7:30 p.m.	at Buffalo	University at Buffalo Stadium; Amherst, NY	ESPN2	W 20–10	11,444	
November 15	7:00 p.m.	Central Michigan	Peden Stadium; Athens, OH	ESPNU	W 34–20	14,736	
November 24	12:00 p.m.	at Akron	InfoCision Stadium; Akron, OH	CBSSN	W 25–14	6,152	
December 16	11:00 a.m.	vs. Georgia Southern*	Brooks Stadium; Conway, SC (Myrtle Beach Bowl)	ESPN	W 41–21	8,059	
*Non-conference game; ^{†}Homecoming; All times are in Eastern time; Source:

== Game summaries ==
=== At San Diego State ===
Ohio Bobcats (0–0) vs. San Diego State Aztecs (0–0)

Quarter	1	2	3	4	Total
Ohio	3	3	0	7	13
San Diego State	3	7	0	10	20

at Snapdragon Stadium, San Diego, CA

- Date: Saturday, August 26, 2023
- Game time: 7:00 p.m. EDT
- Game weather: sunny, Temperature:83 °F (28 °C), Wind:North 9 mph
- Game attendance: 23,867
- Referee: Christian Watson
- TV announcers (FS1): Tim Brando and Spencer Tillman
- Ohio notes, boxscore

Game information

First Quarter

- (10:53) SDSU - Jack Browning 49 yd FG 10 plays, 44 yards, TOP 04:07 (SDSU 3–0)
- (04:22) OHIO - Gianni Spetic 19 yd FG 14 plays, 81 yards, TOP 06:26 (Tied 3–3)

Second Quarter

- (04:44) OHIO - Gianni Spetic 40 yd FG 11 plays, 56 yards, TOP 06:01 (OHIO 6–3)
- (00:00) SDSU - Mark Redman 13 yd pass from Jalen Mayden (Jack Browning kick) 7 plays, 71 yards, TOP 00:44 (SDSU 10–6)

Third Quarter

- No scoring plays

Fourth Quarter

- (13:32) SDSU - Jack Browning 21 yd FG 10 plays, 77 yards, TOP 06:09 (SDSU 13–6)
- (05:39) SDSU - Mark Redman 4 yd pass from Jalen Mayden (Jack Browning kick) 11 plays, 79 yards, TOP 06:29 (SDSU 20–6)
- (01:59) OHIO - Miles Cross 3 yd pass from CJ Harris (Gianni Spetic kick) 15 plays, 65 yards, TOP 03:40 (SDSU 20–13)

Statistics	Ohio	San Diego State
First downs	25	15
Total yards	390	318
Rushes/yards	31/111	31/154
Passing yards	279	164
Passing: Comp–Att–Int	26–51–3	18–28–0
Time of possession	32:36	27:24

Team	Category	Player	Statistics
Ohio	Passing	CJ Harris	18/42, 203 yards, 1 TD, 3 INT
Ohio	Rushing	Sieh Bangura	15 rushes, 65 yards
Ohio	Receiving	Sam Wiglusz	10 receptions, 103 yards
San Diego State	Passing	Jalen Mayden	17/27, 164 yards, 2 TD
San Diego State	Rushing	Jaylon Armstead	8 rushes, 78 yards
San Diego State	Receiving	Mark Redman	5 receptions, 62 yards, 2 TD

Ohio traveled across the country to take on San Diego State in Week 0 game that was the earliest start to a football season in Bobcat history. Defending MAC Player of the Year Kurtis Rourke, who was coming off of an ACL tear, was not cleared as the starting quarterback until the Monday prior to the game. The teams exchanged field goals of their first two drives including a 49-yard connection by SDSU kicker Jack Browning on the opening drive of the game. After an 8 for 10 start, Rourke was pulled from the game for precautionary reasons late in the first quarter after he got up with a limp after being hit in the pocket. He was replaced by backup CJ Harris. Harris threw an interception on his first pass of the season but a missed field goal by Browning left the score tied. Ohio took the lead on a 40-yard FG by Gianni Spetic on a drive led by the running of Sieh Bangura. After an Aztec punt, Harris moved the Bobcats in position to take a two score lead going into halftime but was intercepted by Cedarious Barfield. After the return, San Diego State marched 71 yards in 44 seconds to take the lead on a Mark Redman touchdown reception on the final play of the half.

Ohio used up most of the third quarter on a 19 play drive to open the half but it resulted in a missed field goal. Another Browning field goal and another touchdown catch by Redman gave SDSU a two score lead with 6:20 left in the fourth quarter. Harris led Ohio on a 15 play drive that concluded with a touchdown pass to Miles Cross. Ohio's defense stopped the Aztecs on fourth down with 59 seconds remaining to give their offense a chance. After driving to the SDSU 33, New Zealand Williams intercepted Harris and returned it 40 yards to run out the clock.

=== Vs. LIU ===
LIU Sharks (0–0) (FCS) vs. Ohio Bobcats (0–1)

Quarter	1	2	3	4	Total
LIU	0	3	0	7	10
Ohio	3	14	10	0	27

at Peden Stadium • Athens, OH

- Date: Saturday, September 2, 2023
- Game time: 12:00 p.m. EDT
- Game weather: sunny, Temperature:83 °F (28 °C)
- Game attendance: 18,453
- Referee: Rich Edwards
- TV announcers (ESPN+): Michael Reghi, Jerod Cherry
- Ohio notes, boxscore

Game information

First Quarter

- (02:44) OHIO - Gianni Spetic 24 yd FG 10 plays, 73 yards, TOP 05:13 (OHIO 3–0)

Second Quarter

- (10:30) OHIO - Tyler Walton 3 yd pass from CJ Harris (Gianni Spetic Kick) 10 plays, 57 yards, TOP 6:19 (OHIO 10–0)
- (04:21) OHIO - Bryce Butler 9 yd pass from Parker Navarro (Gianni Spetic Kick) 7 plays, 32 yards, TOP 3:55 (OHIO 17–0)
- (00:00) LIU - Michael Coney 41 yd FG 3 plays, 24 yards, TOP 00:20 (OHIO 17–3)

Third Quarter

- (11:50) OHIO - Mason Williams 32 yd pass from Parker Navarro (Gianni Spetic Kick) 6 plays, 75 yards, TOP 3:10 (OHIO 24–3)
- (04:13) OHIO - Gianni Spetic 25 yd FG 4 plays, 3 yards, TOP 01:56 (OHIO 27–3)

Fourth Quarter

- (06:21) LIU - Davon Wells 15 yd pass from Luca Stanzani (Michael Coney Kick) 4 plays, 35 yards, TOP 1:54 (OHIO 27–10)

Statistics	LIU	Ohio
First downs	13	18
Total yards	206	303
Rushes/yards	22/34	45/199
Passing yards	172	104
Passing: Comp–Att–Int	21–33	12–15
Time of possession	26:51	33:09

Team	Category	Player	Statistics
LIU	Passing	Luca Stanzani	21/33, 173 yards, 1 TD, 2 INT
LIU	Rushing	Pat Bowen	5 rushes, 16 yards
LIU	Receiving	Quincy McDuffie	3 receptions, 43 yards
Ohio	Passing	Parker Navarro	5/7, 60 yards, 2 TD, 1 INT
Ohio	Rushing	Sieh Bangura	19 rushes, 107 yards
Ohio	Receiving	Tyler Walton	4 receptions, 36 yards, 1 TD

In a game in which the Bobcats were heavily favored the staff chose to sit several starters Ohio played conservatively and kept the ball on the ground much of the game. CJ Harris started at quarterback. He and Parker Navarro combined to complete 12 or 15 pass attempts. Ohio ran the ball 45 times with Sieh Bangura getting 107 yards on 19 attempts to win MAC Offensive Player of the Week honors. Linebacker Bryce Houston had 11 tackles with an interception and a sack to win MAC Defensive player of the week as the Bobcats cruised to a 27–10 victory over Long Island.

=== At Florida Atlantic ===
Ohio Bobcats (1–1) vs. Florida Atlantic Owls (1–0)

Quarter	1	2	3	4	Total
Ohio	0	7	7	3	17
Florida Atlantic	0	10	0	0	10

at FAU Stadium, Boca Raton, FL

- Date: Saturday, September 9, 2023
- Game time: 6:00 p.m. EDT
- Game weather: sunny, Wind:East 4 mph
- Game attendance: 17,934
- Referee: Edwin Lee
- TV announcers (ESPN+): James Westling, Leger Douzable, Smacker Miles
- Ohio notes, boxscore

Game information

First Quarter

- No scoring plays

Second Quarter

- (06:54) FAU - Logan Lupo 37 yd FG 10 plays, 13 yards, TOP 02:09 (FAU 3–0)
- (05:12) FAU - Jarron Morris 72 yd interception return (Carter Davis kick) (FAU 10–0)
- (00:23) OHIO - Will Kacmarek 13 yd pass from Kurtis Rourke (Gianni Spetic kick) 11 plays, 75 yards, TOP 04:49 (FAU 10–7)

Third Quarter

- (05:38) OHIO – O'Shaan Allison 5 yd run (Alex Kasee kick) 9 plays, 80 yards, TOP 05:39 (OHIO 14–10)

Fourth Quarter

- (05:26) OHIO – Alex Kasee 39 yd FG 11 plays, 38 yards, TOP 05:49 (OHIO 17–10)

Statistics	Ohio	Florida Atlantic
First downs	23	13
Total yards	354	185
Rushes/yards	45/151	15/5
Passing yards	203	180
Passing: Comp–Att–Int	18–28–2	23–43–2
Time of possession	37:13	21:22

Team	Category	Player	Statistics
Ohio	Passing	Kurtis Rourke	18/29, 203 yards, 1 TD, 2 INT
Ohio	Rushing	O'Shaan Allison	22 rushes, 80 yards, 1 TD
Ohio	Receiving	Mason Williams	2 receptions, 46 yards
Florida Atlantic	Passing	Casey Thompson	23/42, 180 yards, 2 INT
Florida Atlantic	Rushing	Larry McCammon	7 rushes, 23 yards
Florida Atlantic	Receiving	LaJohntay Wester	12 receptions, 101 yards

In a game that went differently from last year's shootout between Ohio and Florida Atlantic in Athens the prior season, Ohio won a defensive struggle by holding off FAU by a score of 17–10. Kurtis Rourke started for Ohio after sitting out the prior week. Casey Thompson started for FAU after transferring from Nebraska during the off season.

Rourke was intercepted on his first pass of the game. However, Thompson gave Ohio the ball right back with an interception by Austin Brawley on the next play. Ohio moved into field goal range on the ensuing possession, but, in the first of what would be many missed opportunities for Ohio's offense, Alex Kasee missed a 44-yard field goal attempt. After an FAU three and out, Ohio again got into field goal range. However, in lieu of another long field goal try they were stopped on fourth down. After a series of drives ending in punts, a Sieh Bangura fumble in the second quarter set up a Logan Lupo field goal to give the Owls the lead. On the next possession, Ohio drove into Owl territory again but Jarron Morris intercepted a Rourke pass off Ty Walton's hands and returned it 72 yards to give the Owls a ten-point lead. Rourke then led the Bobcats on an 11 play, 75-yard drive and this time they capitalized with a touchdown pass to Will Kacmarek to cut the lead to three.

After an FAU punt to open the second half, Ohio went on another long touchdown drive that culminated with an O'Shaan Allison 5 yard rush. After an exchange of punts Tank Pearson intercepted a Thompson pass set up a Kasee field goal to put Ohio up by a touchdown with 5 minutes left. Ohio's offense played conservatively the rest of the way and finished the game with 45 rushing attempts as they relied on their defense to stop the final two Owl drives and preserve the win. The Bobcat defense forced two turnovers and held the Owls to 185 total yards with only 5 yards rushing. Both FAU scores were set up by Bobcat turnovers. LaJohntay Wester was the lone bright spot for the Owls' offense with 12 catches for 101 yards.

=== Vs. Iowa State ===
Iowa State Cyclones (1–1) vs. Ohio Bobcats (2–1)

Quarter	1	2	3	4	Total
Iowa State	0	0	0	7	7
Ohio	0	0	7	3	10

at Peden Stadium • Athens, OH

- Date: Saturday, September 16, 2023
- Game time: 12:00 p.m. EDT
- Game weather: sunny
- Game attendance: 21,991
- Referee: Henry Johns
- TV announcers (ESPNU): John Schriffen, Rocky Boiman, Dawn Davenport
- Ohio notes, boxscore

Game information

First Quarter

- No scoring plays

Second Quarter

- No scoring plays

Third Quarter

- (11:18) OHIO - Sam Wiglusz 5 yd pass from Kurtis Rourke (Gianni Spetic kick) 6 plays, 23 yards, TOP 02:51 (OHIO 7–0)

Fourth Quarter

- (05:26) OHIO – Gianni Spetic 27 yd FG 12 plays, 81 yards, TOP 05:47 (OHIO 10–0)
- (11:18) ISU - Jayden Higgins 5 yd pass from Rocco Becht (Chase Contreraz kick) 2 plays, 72 yards, TOP 00:48 (OHIO 10–7)

Statistics	Iowa State	Ohio
First downs	13	18
Total yards	271	247
Rushes/yards	23/38	37/112
Passing yards	233	135
Passing: Comp–Att–Int	17–24–2	16–32–0
Time of possession	24:09	35:51

Team	Category	Player	Statistics
Iowa State	Passing	Rocco Becht	17/24, 233 yards, 1 TD, 2 INT
Iowa State	Rushing	Rocco Becht	9 rushes, 31 yards
Iowa State	Receiving	Daniel Jackson	3 receptions, 65 yards
Ohio	Passing	Kurtis Rourke	16/32, 135 yards, 1 TD
Ohio	Rushing	Kurtis Rourke	7 rushes, 58 yards
Ohio	Receiving	Sam Wiglusz	5 receptions, 53 yards, 1 TD

In another defensive slugfest, Ohio's offense eked out enough points against the top defense in the Big 12 Conference from the prior season to edge Iowa State by a score of 10–7. Points were hard to come by. Each team had one drive during the first half that ended in a missed long field goal attempt but the other possessions in the first half ended in a combined six punts and Ohio's final possession that ended with the half expiring. The score at the half was deadlocked at zero with very little productivity out of either offensive unit.

Ohio caught the first break major break of the game when a Cyclone receiver slipped on his route on the second play from scrimmage of the second half. The play resulted in Torrie Cox Jr. intercepting a Rocco Becht pass that set the Bobcats up with a short field on offense. They capitalized six plays later when Sam Wiglusz grabbed a 5-yard touchdown pass from Kurtis Rourke on third and goal. Iowa State managed one first down on the next drive but the teams then exchanged three and out possessions.

Ohio's offense finally found some rhythm near the end of the third quarter. The Bobcat's managed a 12 play drive netting 81 yards that ate 5:47 off of the clock. Ohio kicker Gianni Spetic hit a 27-yard field goal to give Ohio a ten-point lead early in the fourth quarter. On the ensuing drive the Cyclones found some offense and marched 63 yards on 14 plays. They passed on going for a first down on 4th and 1 from the Ohio 19. Instead, they opted for a short field goal attempt with controversial results. The ball passed high over the right goal post and was ruled as a miss. After an Ohio three and out, Iowa State's offense provided just what it needed to get back in the game with a quick two play touchdown drive ending in an 18-yard touchdown reception by Jaydin Higgins. After Ohio could only manage one first down on their next possession, a punt set up the Cyclones with a chance starting from their own 12-yard line. Becht's pass on the first play was defected and bounced back toward defensive lineman Rodney Mathews who snatched a game sealing interception.

Ohio's defense held Iowa State to 7 points, 271 yards, and forced two Cyclone turnovers. Linebacker Bryce Houston led the way and won his second MAC East Defensive Player of the Week award on the young season with a 15-tackle performance. Ohio's offense was equally unproductive but made fewer mistakes than the Cyclones and that made the difference in the game. The Bobcat offense allowed no sacks, never fumbled or dropped a pass, did not commit a single penalty or turn the ball over, held the ball for almost 36 minutes, and, other than the plays killing the clock at the end of the game, had only one rushing attempt for negative yardage.

=== At Bowling Green ===
Ohio Bobcats (3–1) vs. Bowling Green Falcons (1–2)

Quarter	1	2	3	4	Total
Ohio	21	10	7	0	38
Bowling Green	0	0	0	7	7

at Doyt Perry Stadium, Bowling Green, OH

- Date: Saturday, September 23, 2023
- Game time: 3:30 p.m. EDT
- Game weather: sunny
- Game attendance: 18,248
- Referee: Rich Edwards
- TV announcers (ESPN+): Doug Sherman, Marcus Ray
- Ohio notes, boxscore

Game information

First Quarter

- (13:08) OHIO - Sieh Bangura 29 yd pass from Kurtis Rourke (Gianni Spetic kick) 2 plays, 28 yards, TOP 01:12 (OHIO 7–0)
- (08:38) OHIO - Will Kacmarek 10 yd pass from Kurtis Rourke (Gianni Spetic kick) 6 plays, 79 yards, TOP 03:33 (OHIO 14–0)
- (08:38) OHIO - Keye Thompson 71 yd fumble return (Gianni Spetic Kick) 6 plays, 46 yards, TOP 03:29 (OHIO 21–0)

Second Quarter

- (08:38) OHIO - Gianni Spetic 27 yd FG 9 plays, 58 yards, TOP 04:51 (OHIO 24–0)
- (08:35) OHIO - Roman Parodie 28 yd fumble return (Gianni Spetic Kick) 1 play, -7 yards, TOP 00:08 (OHIO 31–0)

Third Quarter

- (01:22) OHIO - Miles Cross 19 yd pass from Kurtis Rourke (Gianni Spetic Kick) 10 plays, 77 yards, TOP 06:33 (OHIO 38–0)

Fourth Quarter

- (13:42) BGSU - Terion Stewart 4 yd run (Alan Anaya Kick) 6 plays, 69 yards, TOP 02:35 (OHIO 38–7)

Statistics	Ohio	Bowling Green
First downs	19	10
Total yards	328	211
Rushes/yards	37/127	22/102
Passing yards	201	109
Passing: Comp–Att–Int	16–19–0	16–31–2
Time of possession	34:13	25:47

Team	Category	Player	Statistics
Ohio	Passing	Kurtis Rourke	14/16, 196 yards, 3 TD
Ohio	Rushing	O'Shaan Allison	13 rushes, 42 yards
Ohio	Receiving	Jacoby Jones	4 receptions, 85 yards
Bowling Green	Passing	Connor Bazelak	16/31, 109 yards, 2 INT
Bowling Green	Rushing	Terion Stewart	12 rushes, 107 yards, 1 TD
Bowling Green	Receiving	Odieu Hiliare	5 receptions, 85 yards

Ohio spoiled Bowling Green's homecoming by putting up 38 points, their highest point total of the young season, but it was again Ohio's defense that stole the show. Ohio's defense held Bowling Green to 211 yards and forced 4 turnovers, scored 2 touchdowns, and did not surrender points until the game was out of hand with Ohio holding a 38–0 lead in the 4th quarter.

Former Missouri and Indiana starting quarterback Connor Bazelak was intercepted by Ohio linebacker Keye Thompson on the game's opening possession. Ohio capitalized on their second play with a 29 catch by running back Sieh Bangura. After a Bowling Green three and out Ohio went up by fourteen on a Will Kacmarek 10 yard reception. On the ensuing possession Keye Thompson came up big for Ohio after recovering a fumble forced by Vonnie Watkins and returned it 71 yards for a touchdown to put Ohio up by 21 less than ten minutes into the game. Thompson's big plays would eran him MAC East Defensive Player of the week. After a Gianni Spetic field goal early in the second quarter, Bryce Houston and Torrie Cox Jr forced a fumble that was picked up by Roman Parodie for the second scoop and score of the game. Beginning early in the 3rd quarter A 10 play, 77-yard drive resulted in Kurtus Rourke's third touchdown pass of the game. This time Miles Cross was on the receiving end to put the Bobcats up 38–0. Bowling Green got on the board with a 4-yard rush by Terion Stewart in the 4th quarter to make the final 38–7.

Ohio's offense again played conservatively with another strong defensive performance. They kept the ball on the ground 37 times and held the ball for over 34 minutes. Rourke was 14 of 16 on his pass attempts for 198 yards and 3 touchdowns. His 98.5 Total QBR Rating on the game led the FBS for the week.

=== Vs. Kent State ===
Kent State Golden Flashes (1–4) vs. Ohio Bobcats (4–1)

Quarter	1	2	3	4	Total
Kent State	0	7	3	7	17
Ohio	0	21	14	7	42

at Peden Stadium • Athens, OH

- Date: Saturday, October 7, 2023
- Game time: 3:30 p.m EDT
- Game weather: sunny
- Game attendance: 22,945
- Referee: Jeremy Valentine
- TV announcers (ESPN+): Michael Reghi, Jerod Cherry
- Ohio notes, boxscore

Game information

First Quarter

- No scoring plays

Second Quarter

- (13:35) OHIO - Miles Cross 25 yd pass from Kurtis Rourke (Gianni Spetic kick) 6 plays, 55 yards, TOP 02:16 (OHIO 7–0)
- (11:20) KENT - Chrishon McCray 42 yd pass from Michael Alaimo (Andrew Glass Kick) 7 plays, 77 yards, TOP 02:09 (Tied 7–7)
- (04:05) OHIO - Sam Wiglusz 30 yd pass from Kurtis Rourke (Gianni Spetic kick) 2 plays, 45 yards, TOP 00:49 (OHIO 14–7)
- (00:37) OHIO – Kurtis Rourke 4 yd run (Gianni Spetic kick) 5 plays, 57 yards, TOP 01:53 (OHIO 21–7)

Third Quarter

- (12:18) KENT – Andrew Glass 37 yd FG 7 plays, 42 yards, TOP 02:34 (OHIO 21–10)
- (09:13) OHIO - Miles Cross 22 yd pass from Kurtis Rourke (Gianni Spetic kick) 6 plays, 90 yards, TOP 02:59 (OHIO 28–10)
- (05:39) OHIO – Sieh Bangura 3 yd run (Gianni Spetic kick) 6 plays, 31 yards, TOP 02:56 (OHIO 35–10)

Fourth Quarter

- (13:26) OHIO – Sieh Bangura 3 yd run (Gianni Spetic kick) 11 plays, 69 yards, TOP 05:31 (OHIO 42–10)
- (09:57) KENT - Chrishon McCray 10 yd pass from Tommy Ulatowski (Andrew Glass Kick) 10 plays, 76 yards, TOP 03:23 (OHIO 42–17)

Statistics	Kent State	Ohio
First downs	16	24
Total yards	228	466
Rushes/yards	36/109	35/166
Passing yards	119	300
Passing: Comp–Att–Int	11–20–1	20–32–0
Time of possession	27:04	32:56

Team	Category	Player	Statistics
Kent State	Passing	Michael Alaimo	9/13, 107 yards, 1 TD, 1 INT
Kent State	Rushing	Jaylen Thomas	24 rushes, 67 yards
Kent State	Receiving	Chrishon McCray	6 receptions, 93 yards, 2 TD
Ohio	Passing	Kurtis Rourke	20/32, 300 yards, 3 TD
Ohio	Rushing	Parker Navarro	3 rushes, 65 yards
Ohio	Receiving	Miles Cross	7 receptions, 125 yards, 2 TD

Ohio won its homecoming matchup with the Kent State Golden Flashes. They won at home for the ninth straight time and won their ninth straight MAC regular season game. Ohio had its best offensive output so far on the season with 42 points. The Bobcats gave quarterback Kurtis Rourke his first real opportunity to air it out since tearing his ACL in 2022. He took advantage of 32 pass attempts by netting 300 passing yards with 3 touchdowns and also scored on the ground. Two of the touchdowns were caught by Miles Cross who had 125 receiving yards on the day. That was good enough for Cross to win MAC East Offensive Player of the Week honors. Sam Wiglusz caught the other TD and ended with 44 yards. Ohio's defense had another good effort as they held Kent State to 228 total yards. Linebacker Bryce Houston continued his stellar season with 10 tackles, ½ sack, 1½ tackles for loss, and an interception. Bradley Weaver added 2 sacks for the Bobcats. Chrishon McCray was the offensive bright spot for Kent State with 93 receiving yards and 2 touchdowns.

Both offenses started slowly as the first quarter ended 0–0. Cross caught is first touchdown early in the second but Kent State immediately responded with a 42-yard bomb to McCray from Michael Alaimo. After an exchange of punts, Wiglusz scored the first of five touchdowns in five possessions on a 30-yard reception that was ruled a catch after official review. Rourke scored from 4 yards out on a rush just before the half as Ohio took a 21–7 lead. The Kent State opened the second half with a field goal but then Ohio broke the game open in the second half with another Cross catch and two 3 yard rushing touchdowns from running back Sieh Bangura. McCray caught his second touchdown from Golden Flashes backup quarterback Tommy Ulatowski in the fourth quarter to make the final 42–17.

=== Vs. Northern Illinois ===
Ohio Bobcats(5–1) vs. Northern Illinois Huskies (2–4)

Quarter	1	2	3	4	Total
Ohio	3	10	0	0	13
Northern Illinois	7	0	10	6	23

at Huskie Stadium • DeKalb, IL

- Date: Saturday, October 14, 2023
- Game time: 4:00 p.m. EDT
- Game weather: cloudy, Temperature:53 °F (12 °C), Wind:Southwest 17 mph
- Game attendance: 11,143
- Referee: Andrew Speciale
- TV announcers (ESPNU): Drew Carter, Dustin Fox
- Ohio notes, boxcore

Game information

First Quarter

- (08:18) NIU - Gavin Williams 53 yd run (Kanon Woodill Kick) 7 plays, 85 yards, TOP 04:05 (NIU 7–0)
- (03:04) OHIO - Gianni Spetic 27 yd FG 10 plays, 51 yards, TOP 05:10 (NIU 7–3)

Second Quarter

- (10:22) OHIO - Kurtis Rourke 1 yd run (Gianni Spetic Kick) 13 plays, 60 yards, TOP 07:00 (OHIO 10–7)
- (00:07) OHIO - Gianni Spetic 37 yd FG 16 plays, 69 yards, TOP 06:00 (OHIO 13–7)

Third Quarter

- (12:54) NIU - Grayson Barnes 58 yd pass from Rocky Lombardi (Kanon Woodill Kick) 3 plays, 66 yards, TOP 01:10 (NIU 14–13)
- (02:12) NIU - Kanon Woodill 31 yd FG 12 plays, 68 yards, TOP 06:50 (NIU 17–13)

Fourth Quarter

- (10:31) NIU - Kanon Woodill 37 yd FG 9 plays, 40 yards, TOP 05:11 (NIU 20–13)
- (08:09) NIU - Kanon Woodill 32 yd FG 4 plays, 5 yards, TOP 02:05 (NIU 23–13)

Statistics	Ohio	Northern Illinois
First downs	16	13
Total yards	254	302
Rushes/yards	159	172
Passing yards	159	172
Passing: Comp–Att–Int	22–36–3	15–23–0
Time of possession	28:15	31:45

Team	Category	Player	Statistics
Ohio	Passing	Kurtis Rourke	23/36, 159 yards, 3 INT
Ohio	Rushing	O'Shaan Allison	11 rushes, 43 yards
Ohio	Receiving	Sam Wiglusz	4 receptions, 37 yards
Northern Illinois	Passing	Rocky Lombardi	15/23, 172 yards, 1 TD
Northern Illinois	Rushing	Gavin Williams	10 rushes, 55 yards, 1 TD
Northern Illinois	Receiving	Grayson Barnes	2 receptions, 66 yards, 1 TD

On a windy day in DeKalb, Illinois both offenses struggled moving the ball. Northern Illinois kept the ball on the ground 34 times for 130 yard while Ohio's passing attack turned it over three times in the fourth as the Huskies defended their turf on their homecoming defeating the Bobcats by a score of 23–13.

Northern Illinois struck first on their second possession of the game as Gavin Williams broke loose on a rush from 53 yards out for the first touchdown the Ohio defense surrendered in the first quarter on the season. Ohio responded with a field goal on the ensuing possession and took the lead on a 1-yard run by quarterback Kurtis Rourke on their next possession. Ohio's offense burned up nearly the rest of the half with a 16 play drive on their next possession as Gianni Spetic connected on a 37-yard field goal with seven seconds remaining.to take a 13–7 lead into the break.

After an Ohio 3 and out to open the second half, NIU quarterback Rocky Lombardi found Grayson Barnes on a short pass on third and 2 and he got behind the Bobcat defense and scampered 58 yards to retake the lead. The Huskies extended the lead after a nine play drive on their next possession ending in 37-yard field goal by Kanon Woodill. Ohio's offense failed to move the ball against the wind in the third quarter gaining only 37 yards on three possessions. Now behind and with the wind the in fourth they opened up the passing game with disastrous results. Rourke missed his receiver resulting in an interception on all three Ohio possessions. Two of which set Northern Illinois's offense up for late field goals as the game ended in 23–13 Huskie victory. Lombardi finished the game with 172 yards and no turnovers while Rourke was held to 159 yards.

=== Vs. Western Michigan ===
Western Michigan Broncos (2–5) vs. Ohio Bobcats (5–2)

Quarter	1	2	3	4	Total
Western Michigan	0	0	10	7	17
Ohio	3	3	7	7	20

at Peden Stadium • Athens, OH

- Date: Saturday, October 21, 2023
- Game time: 12:00 p.m. EDT
- Game weather: sunny
- Game attendance: 16,048
- Referee: William Williams
- TV announcers (CBSSN): Jason Knapp, Russ Tucker
- Ohio notes, boxscore

Game information

First Quarter

- (08:49) OHIO - Gianni Spetic 28 yd FG 13 plays, 57 yards, TOP 04:51 (OHIO 3–0)

Second Quarter

- (00:02) OHIO - Gianni Spetic 19 yd FG 6 plays, 80 yards, TOP 00:37 (OHIO 6–0)

Third Quarter

- (07:07) WMU - Palmer Domschk 43 yd FG 6 plays, 52 yards, TOP 02:29 (OHIO 6–3)
- (02:36) OHIO - Sieh Bangura 1 yd run (Gianni Spetic kick) 9 plays, 75 yards, TOP 04:31 (OHIO 13–3)
- (00:18) WMU - Hayden Wolff 3 yd run (Palmer Domschk kick) 5 plays, 41 yards, TOP 02:07 (OHIO 13–10)

Fourth Quarter

- (04:36) OHIO - Sam Wiglusz 7 yd pass from Kurtis Rourke (Gianni Spetic kick) 8 plays, 78 yards, TOP 05:05 (OHIO 20–10)
- (00:18) WMU - Kenneth Womack 8 yd pass from Hayden Wolff (Palmer Domschke Kick) 8 plays, 68 yards, TOP 02:09 (OHIO 20–17)

Statistics	Western Michigan	Ohio
First downs	21	28
Total yards	369	460
Rushes/yards	22/79	39/185
Passing yards	290	275
Passing: Comp–Att–Int	30–42–1	24–39–0
Time of possession	24:25	35:35

Team	Category	Player	Statistics
Western Michigan	Passing	Hayden Wolff	30/42, 290 yards, 1 TD, 1 INT
Western Michigan	Rushing	CJ Hester	5 rushes, 26 yards
Western Michigan	Receiving	Kenneth Womack	14 receptions, 90 yards, 1 TD
Ohio	Passing	Kurtis Rourke	24/39, 275 yards, 1 TD
Ohio	Rushing	Sieh Bangura	15 rushes, 86 yards, 1 TD
Ohio	Receiving	Sam Wiglusz	10 receptions, 155 yards, 1 TD

In a game a day where both offenses moved the ball well but failed to capitalize with a lot of points, Ohio managed to hold on late to edge Western Michigan by a score of 20–17 to become bowl eligible. After WMU opened with a 3 an out, the Bobcats went on a 13 play drive but had to settle for an 18-yard field goal. The Broncos responded with an 11 play drive of their own. On the following possession WMU drove 43 yards but missed a 4-yard field goal try. After an Ohio 3 and out, the Broncos got to the Ohio 6 yard line but penalties left them missing a 41-yard field. Early in the second quarter Ohio drove to the Western Michigan 41 but were stuffed on 4th and short. After an exchange of punts it was WMU that was stopped on 4th down at the Bobcat 22. Following another Ohio punt, the Broncos again got into Ohio territory but a Hayden Wolfe pass was picked off by Tank Pearson at the 18 yard line. OU took over with 0:39 left in the half. On the 5th play of the drive a 38-yard reception by Sam Wiglusz put them on the WMU 13. Kurtis Rourke tried to hit Miles Cross in the corner of the end zone but a pass interference penalty prevented a touchdown. Now with the ball spotted on the 2, and with only 4 seconds left in the half, Ohio chose to settle for a short field goal. After one half of play the two teams managed to combine for only 6 points.

Ohio received the second half kickoff but an 11-play drive ended in a missed 25-yard field goal. WMU went 52 yards on the ensuing drive and got on the scoreboard by finally succeeding on a field goal try. This one was from 43 yard. Ohio was the first team to find the endzone as the as running back Sieh Bangura found paydirt with a 1-yard rush with 2:36 left in the 3rd quarter. WMU's offense quickly moved down the field to get back within three 5 plays later as quarterback Hayden Wolff scored from 3 yards out. Ohio went on a 9 play, 66-yard drive early in the 4th but, again, failed to capitalize, as the drive ended in another missed short field goal from 26 yards. Ohio's defense held the lead and forced a WMU punt. The Bobcats took control on the game when Rourke found Wiglusz in the endzone with 4:36 remaining to take a 20–10 lead. The Broncos kept hope alive with a TD reception by Kenneth Womack late in the game but after a first down on the next possession on the running of O'Shaun Allison, Ohio was able to run out the clock.

Wiglusz had a big day with 10 catches for 155 yards. Rourke threw for 275 yards while Bangura had 85 yards on the ground. Linebackers Keye Thompson and Bryce Houston led the defense with 13 and 12 tackles respectively. Punter Jack Wilson aided the Bobcat cause averaging 48 yards per punt to win MAC East Special Teams Player of the Week. Hayden Wolff threw for 290 yards for the Broncos with 90 going to Womack who had 14 catches.

=== Vs. Miami (OH) ===
Miami RedHawks (6–2) vs. Ohio Bobcats (6–2)

Quarter	1	2	3	4	Total
Miami	0	13	10	7	30
Ohio	9	0	0	7	16

at Peden Stadium • Athens, OH

- Date: Saturday, October 28, 2023
- Game time: 3:30 EDT
- Game weather: sunny
- Game attendance: 19,854
- Referee: David Siegle
- TV announcers (CBSSN): Jason Knapp, Malik Zaire
- Ohio notes, boxscore

Game information

First Quarter

- (09:57) OHIO - Sieh Bangura 2 yd Run (Gianni Spetic PAT blocked) 6 plays, 79 yards, TOP 03:04 (OHIO 6–0)
- (01:28) OHIO - Gianni Spetic 33 yd Field Goal 14 plays, 49 yards, TOP 06:35 (OHIO 9–0)

Second Quarter

- (12:11) M–OH - Graham Nicholson 26 yd Field Goal 4 plays, 2 yards, TOP 01:15 (OHIO 9–3)
- (04:20) M–OH - Graham Nicholson 40 yd Field Goal 9 plays, 36 yards, TOP 05:20 (OHIO 9–6)
- (01:21) M–OH - Rashad Amos 1 yd Run (Graham Nicholson Kick) 4 plays, 80 yards, TOP 01:24 (M–OH 13–9)

Third Quarter

- (11:22) M–OH - Graham Nicholson 32 yd Field Goal 4 plays, 5 yards, TOP 02:04 (M–OH 16–9)
- (01:21) M–OH - Aveon Smith 3 yd Run (Graham Nicholson Kick) 5 plays, 60 yards, TOP 02:21 (M–OH 23–9)

Fourth Quarter

- (11:13) M–OH - Kevin Davis 46 yd pass from Aveon Smith (Graham Nicholson Kick) 7 plays, 72 yards, TOP 03:58 (M–OH 30–9)
- (07:56) OHIO - Tyler Walton 1 Yd pass from Kurtis Rourke (Gianni Spetic Kick) 11 plays, 75 yards, TOP 03:17 (M–OH 30–16)

Statistics	Miami	Ohio
First downs	14	19
Total yards	291	363
Rushes/yards	45/188	26/50
Passing yards	103	313
Passing: Comp–Att–Int	7–11–0	25–39–0
Time of possession	32:19	27:41

Team	Category	Player	Statistics
Miami	Passing	Aveon Smith	7/11, 103 yards, 1 TD
Miami	Rushing	Rashad Amos	21 rushes, 163 yards, 1 TD
Miami	Receiving	Kevin Davis	3 receptions, 61 yards, 1 TD
Ohio	Passing	Kurtis Rourke	25/39, 313 yards, 1 TD
Ohio	Rushing	Sieh Bangura	9 rushes, 38 yards, 1 TD
Ohio	Receiving	Sam Wiglusz	5 receptions, 79 yards

Miami snapped Ohio's ten game home winning streak and took possession of first place in the MAC East with a rivalry win in the Battle of the Bricks in spite of their starting quarterback Brett Gabbert being lost for the season with an injury during the prior week. Ohio jumped out to a 9–0 lead by the end of the first quarter with a rushing touchdown by Sieh Bangura and a field goal by Gianni Spetic. Miami converted a field goal after a strip sack of Kurtis Rourke by Brian Ugwu set them on Ohio's 11 yard line. That was the first of 30 straight points the RedHawks would score as they took a 30–9 in the fourth quarter. A late Ohio touchdown catch by Ty Walton made the final 30–16.

Miami kept the ball on the ground 46 times and rushed for 188 yards. Rashad Amos has 163 yards on the ground and Aveon Smith had 103 yards passing. Playing from behind for much of the game Rourke had his highest passing yard total so far on the year with 313 yards.

=== At Buffalo ===
Ohio Bobcats (6–3) vs. Buffalo Bulls (3–2)

Quarter	1	2	3	4	Total
Ohio	0	0	10	10	20
Buffalo	0	3	0	7	10

at University at Buffalo Stadium, Amherst, NY

- Date: Tuesday, November 7, 2023
- Game time: 7:30 p.m. EDT
- Game weather: clear
- Game attendance: 11,444
- Referee: Jeremy Valentine
- TV announcers (ESPN2): Jay Alter, Tom Luginbill, Lericia Harris
- Ohio notes, boxscore

Game information

First Quarter

- (06:24) BUFF - Alex McNulty 41 yd FG 10 plays, 71 yards, TOP 05:51 (BUFF 3–0)

Second Quarter

- No scoring plays

Third Quarter

- (08:48) OHIO – Gianni Spetic 29 yd FG 13 plays, 63 yards, TOP 06:07 (Tied 3–3)
- (02:46) OHIO - Sieh Bangura 2 yd run (Gianni Spetic kick) 7 plays, 38 yards, TOP 03:52 (OHIO 10–3)

Fourth Quarter

- (13:30) BUFF - CJ Ogbonna 2 yd run (Alex McNulty kick) 8 plays, 75 yards, TOP 04:38 (Tied 10–10)
- (08:52) OHIO – Gianni Spetic 25 yd FG 9 plays, 66 yards, TOP 04:38 (OHIO 13–10)
- (01:55) OHIO - Sieh Bangura 1 yd run (Gianni Spetic kick) 8 plays, 29 yards, TOP 05:05 (OHIO 20–3)

Statistics	Ohio	Buffalo
First downs	15	14
Total yards	236	295
Rushes/yards	30/115	41/114
Passing yards	121	181
Passing: Comp–Att–Int	14–21–0	7–16–1
Time of possession	27:50	31:10

Team	Category	Player	Statistics
Ohio	Passing	Kurtis Rourke	14/21, 121 yards
Ohio	Rushing	Sieh Bangura	17 rushes, 78 yards, 2 TD
Ohio	Receiving	Tyler Walton	6 receptions, 62 yards
Buffalo	Passing	Cole Snyder	14/21, 171 yards
Buffalo	Rushing	Ron Cox Jr.	16 rushes, 48 yards
Buffalo	Receiving	Boobie Curry	4 receptions, 66 yards

Ohio went on the road for their first mid-week MACtion game of the season and defeated the Buffalo Bulls by a score of 20–10. Buffalo outplayed Ohio during the first half, marching as far as the Ohio 14, 23, and 37 on three of their first half drives but only had one Alex McNulty field goal to show for it.

Ohio took the opening kickoff of the second half and after a 13 play drive tied the score with a short field goal off the leg of Gianni Spetic. After reaching the Buffalo two on their next possession, head coach Tim Albin decided to go for it on 4th down and Ohio took their first lead when Sieh Bangura found paydirt. The Bulls immediately responded and retied the score on the ensuing drive with a CJ Ogbonna touchdown rush early in the fourth quarter. The Bobcats took the lead again after another 13 play drive ended in a Spetic field goal. After Buffalo fumbled on their next possession, Ohio took advantage with another Bangura touchdown to provide the final margin.

Ohio's offense was limited to a season low 236 total yards. Their defense was the key to the win. Linebackers Keye Thompson and Bryce Houston led the way with 13 and 12 tackles each. Thompson won his second MAC East Defensive Player of the Week award for the effort.

=== Vs. Central Michigan ===
Central Michigan (5–5) vs. Ohio Bobcats (7–3)

Quarter	1	2	3	4	Total
Central Michigan	0	7	7	6	20
Ohio	10	7	14	3	34

at Peden Stadium • Athens, OH

- Date: Wednesday, November 15, 2023
- Game time: 7:00 p.m. EDT
- Game weather: Sunny, Temperature: 50 °F (10 °C), Wind: SW 14mph
- Game attendance: 14,736
- Referee: Andrew Speciale
- TV announcers (ESPNU): Jason Ross, Dustin Fox
- Ohio notes, boxscore

Game information

First Quarter

- (09:49) OHIO – Gianni Spetic 39 yd FG 7 plays, 41 yards, TOP 03:56 (OHIO 3–0)
- (06:19) OHIO - Shane Bonner 21 yd Interception Return (Gianni Spetic Kick) 1 play, 0 yards, TOP 00:08 (OHIO 10–0)

Second Quarter

- (08:19) OHIO – O'Shaan Allison 1 yd run (Gianni Spetic kick) 8 plays, 87 yards, TOP 04:38 (OHIO 17–0)
- (09:57) CMU - Tyson Davis 50 yd pass from Jase Bauer (Tristan Mattson Kick) 7 plays, 60 yards, TOP 03:36 (OHIO 17–7)

Third Quarter

- (10:34) OHIO - Kurtis Rourke 16 yd Run (Gianni Spetic Kick) 8 plays, 75 yards, TOP 04:20 (OHIO 24–7)
- (09:40) CMU - Chris Parker 62 yd pass from Jase Bauer (Tristan Mattson Kick) 2 plays, 64 yards, TOP 00:47 (OHIO 24–14)
- (04:11) OHIO - O'Shaan Allison 1 yd Run (Gianni Spetic Kick) 10 plays, 73 yards, TOP 05:22 (OHIO 31–14)

Fourth Quarter

- (14:18) CMU - Marion Lukes 14 Yd Run (Tristan Mattson PAT failed) 8 plays, 53 yards, TOP 04:48 (OHIO 31–10)
- (06:07) OHIO – Gianni Spetic 33 yd FG 4 plays, 6 yards, TOP 01:40 (OHIO 34–20)

Statistics	Central Michigan	Ohio
First downs	13	21
Total yards	319	377
Rushes/yards	33/162	41/148
Passing yards	157	229
Passing: Comp–Att–Int	10–21–1	16–24–0
Time of possession	22:11	36:56

Team	Category	Player	Statistics
Central Michigan	Passing	Jase Bauer	10/21, 157 yards, 2 TD, 1 INT
Central Michigan	Rushing	Marion Lukes	15 rushes, 75 yards, 1 TD
Central Michigan	Receiving	Chris Parker	1 reception, 62 yards, 1 TD
Ohio	Passing	Kurtis Rourke	15/23, 222 yards
Ohio	Rushing	Sieh Bangura	21 rushes, 126 yards
Ohio	Receiving	Miles Cross	3 receptions, 53 yards

The Bobcats won their final home game of the season with a 34–20 win over Central Michigan. Ohio snapped a six-game losing streak against the Chippewas with their first win in the series since 2011. Ohio jumped out to a 10–0 lead with 6:19 remaining in the first quarter when defensive end Shane Bonner intercepted a Jase Bauer pass and returned it for a touchdown. Then the first of two short touchdown runs by O’Shaaun Allison gave Ohio a 17-point lead midway through the second quarter. CMU responded on the ensuing possession when Tyson Davis got behind the Ohio defense and caught a 50-yard touchdown pass to make the score 17-7 going into the half.

Ohio took the second half kickoff and marched 75 yards in eight play in a drive that culminated in a 16-yard touchdown run by Kurtis Rourke. It was the first of four consecutive touchdown drives. Another long Jase Bauer touchdown pass, this one 62 yards, caught by Chris Parker made the score 24–14. Ohio looked to take command after Allision's second touchdown run but two separate personal fouls on fourth downs kept a CMU touchdown drive alive and the Chips stayed in the game after the drive ended in a Marion Lukes touchdown rush. Ohio's defense shut down CMU for the rest of the game and Ohio's offense was able to control the clock. A fourth quarter field goal by Gianni Spetic made the final a 14-point margin for the Bobcats.

Rourke threw for 222 yards while running back Sieh Bangura had 126 yards and won MAC East Offensive Player of the Week. Linebackers Keye Thompson and Bryce Houston continued their good play with 9 tackles each. Jase Bauer had 157 yards through the air for Central Michigan with most coming on two long touchdown passes.

=== At Akron ===
Ohio Bobcats (8–3) vs. Akron Zips (2–9)

Quarter	1	2	3	4	Total
Ohio	3	0	15	7	25
Akron	0	14	0	0	14

at InfoCision Stadium, Akron, OH

- Date: Friday, November 24, 2023
- Game time: 12:00 p.m. EDT
- Game weather: sunny
- Game attendance: 6,152
- Referee: David Siegle
- TV announcers (CBSSN): Carter Blackburn, Adam Breneman
- Ohio notes, boxscore

Game information

First Quarter

- (10:50) OHIO - Gianni Spetic 26 yd FG 11 plays, 62 yards, TOP 04:10 (OHIO 3–0)

Second Quarter

- (09:53) AKR - Lorenzo Lingard 43 yd pass from Tahj Bullock (Owen Wiley Kick) 5 plays, 66 yards, TOP 02:30 (AKR 7–3)
- (01:50) AKR - Tahj Bullock 5 yd Run (Owen Wiley Kick) 10 plays, 69 yards, TOP 02:44 (AKR 14–3)

Third Quarter

- (08:16) OHIO - Kurtis Rourke 4 yd run (Kurtis Rourke Pass to Tyler Walton) 9 plays, 76 yards, TOP 03:18 (AKR 14–11)
- (02:06) OHIO - Miles Cross 1 yd pass from Kurtis Rourke (Gianni Spetic Kick) 7 plays, 74 yards, TOP 04:13 (OHIO 18–14)

Fourth Quarter

- (07:23) OHIO - Sieh Bangura 1 yd run (Gianni Spetic Kick) 15 plays, 64 yards, TOP 08:41 (OHIO 25–14)

Statistics	Ohio	Akron
First downs	27	13
Total yards	394	183
Rushes/yards	47/186	20/37
Passing yards	208	146
Passing: Comp–Att–Int	19–30–0	17–30–1
Time of possession	38:35	21:25

Team	Category	Player	Statistics
Ohio	Passing	Kurtis Rourke	19/30, 208 yards, 1 TD
Ohio	Rushing	Sieh Bangura	23 rushes, 121 yards, 1 TD
Ohio	Receiving	Miles Cross	7 receptions, 85 yards, 1 TD
Akron	Passing	Jeff Undercuffler Jr.	16/27, 103 yards, 0 TD, 1 INT
Akron	Rushing	Tahj Bullock	6 rushes, 31 yards, 1 TD
Akron	Receiving	Lorenzo Lingard	5 receptions, 54 yards, 1 TD

In the final game of the season Ohio's defense shut down the Akron offense which was held to 183 total yards in a 25–14 win over the Zips to finish the regular season 9–3.

Ohio took the opening kickoff and marched 62 yards in 11 plays but had to settle for a short field goal. Both offenses struggled for the rest of the quarter. The Bobcats missed two long field goals on their first two drives of the second quarter. Akron took advantage of the good field position and scored a touchdown on the ensuing drive following each miss. The first was a long reception by Lorenzo Lingard Tahj Bullock while the second was on a Bullock run. Akron took a 14–3 lead into the half.

Ohio's offense found paydirt on their first three drives of the second half. Kurtis Rourke found Ty Walton for the first and Miles Cross for the second. Bryce Houston intercepted Jeff Undercuffler to set up the third as Sieh Bangura scored from 1 yard out.

Rourke threw for 208 yards and passed his older brother Nathan Rourke for second on Ohio's all time passing yards list and won MAC East Offensive Player of the Week. Cross had 85 receiving yards. Bangura accumulated 121 yards on the ground while Houston had 6 tackles. Jack Wilson averaged 43.3 yards per punt and won his second MAC East Special Teams Player of the Week award on the season.

=== Vs. Georgia Southern ===
2023 Myrtle Beach Bowl - Georgia Southern Eagles (6–6) vs. Ohio Bobcats (9–3)

Quarter	1	2	3	4	Total
Georgia Southern	0	0	14	7	21
Ohio	3	17	14	7	41

at Brooks Stadium • Conway, South Carolina

- Date: Saturday, December 16, 2023
- Game time: 11:00 a.m. EST
- Game weather: sunny
- Game attendance: 8,059
- Referee: Patrick Foy (Mountain West)
- TV announcers (ESPN): Drew Carter (play-by-play), Dustin Fox (analyst), and Stormy Buonantony (sideline)
- Ohio notes, boxscore

Game information

First Quarter

- (06:27) OHIO - Gianni Spetic 27 yd FG 11 plays, 43 yards, TOP 06:42 (OHIO 3–0)

Second Quarter

- (12:22) OHIO - Ricky Hunt 2 yd Run (Gianni Spetic Kick) 13 plays, 59 yards, TOP 07:13 (OHIO 10–0)
- (03:16) OHIO - Ricky Hunt 18 yd pass from Parker Navarro (Gianni Spetic Kick) 4 plays, 62 yards, TOP 01:53 (OHIO 10–0)
- (00:00) OHIO - Gianni Spetic 26 yd FG 6 plays, 25 yards, TOP 01:07 (OHIO 20–0)

Third Quarter

- (11:46) OHIO - Ricky Hunt 6 yd Run (Gianni Spetic Kick) 1 play, 6 yards, TOP 00:05 (OHIO 27–0)
- (07:54) GASO - David Mbadinga 3 yd Run (Michael Lantz Kick) 9 plays, 69 yards, TOP 03:52 (OHIO 27–7)
- (11:46) OHIO - Ricky Hunt 40 yd Run (Gianni Spetic Kick) 6 plays, 60 yards, TOP 03:19 (OHIO 34–7)
- (01:13) GASO - Derwin Burgess Jr. 65 yd pass from Davis Brin 2 plays, 68 yards, TOP 00:51 (OHIO 34–14)

Fourth Quarter

- (12:27) GASO - Jjay Mcafee 15 yd pass from Davis Brin 7 plays, 52 yards, TOP 03:46 (OHIO 34–21)
- (02:52) OHIO - Ricky Hunt 9 yd Run (Gianni Spetic Kick) 8 plays, 55 yards, TOP 03:40 (OHIO 41–21)

Statistics	Georgia Southern	Ohio
First downs	16	18
Total Yards	383	352
Rushes/yards	21–33	46–232
Passing yards	350	120
Passing: Comp–Att–Int	32–42–3	11–16–120
Time of possession	26:40	33:20

Team	Category	Player	Statistics
Georgia Southern	Passing	Davis Brin	32/42, 350 yards, 2 TD, 3 INT
Georgia Southern	Rushing	David Mbadinga	4 rushes, 44 yards, 1 TD
Georgia Southern	Receiving	Derwin Burgess Jr.	6 receptions, 117 yards
Ohio	Passing	Parker Navarro	11/16, 120 yards, 1 TD
Ohio	Rushing	Rickey Hunt	17 rushes, 115 yards, 4 TD
Ohio	Receiving	Sam Wiglusz	5 receptions, 64 yards

The Bobcats sought their 2nd straight 10 win season for the first time in program history against Georgia Southern in the Myrtle Beach Bowl. It was the first time both Ohio and Georgia Southern played in the Myrtle Beach Bowl and the first time that they have played each other. Ohio suffered transfer portal losses before the game as quarterback Kurtis Rourke, starting receivers Miles Cross and Ty Walton, and their top two backs Sieh Bangura and O'Shaan Allison and middle linebacker Keye Thompson left the team.

Ohio struck first, capitalizing with a field goal after Jeremiah Wood intercepted Georgia Southern quarterback Davis Brin on the game's first series. Following an Eagle punt the Bobcat's took a ten point lead on a 13 play drive when freshman running back Ricky Hunt scored on a two yard run. Two plays later Adonis Williams Jr. intercepted Brin for the second time setting Ohio up on the 21 yard line. They failed to capitalize on the turnover as a fourth down pass at the goal line by third-string quarterback Parker Navarro to Sam Wiglusz fell incomplete. After another Eagle punt, Ohio went 62 yards in 4 plays and took a 17–0 lead when Navarro found Hunt from 18 yards out on a jump pass. A Bradley Weaver strip sack of Brin set the Bobcats up for Spetic's second field goal as the half expired.

Following an Ohio punt Walter Reynolds gave Ohio its third interception of Brin as a 40 yard return set the Bobcats up on the Eagle 6 yard line. Hunt ran it into the endzone on the next play. Ohio had jumped out to a 27–0 lead. The Georgia Southern offense found some life and went 69 yards on 6 plays culminating on David Mbadinga touchdown run. After an Ohio three and out, Georgia Southern looked to get back in the game but fumbled away a chance the Ohio 10. Six plays later, Hunt burst through the Eagle defense and scored from 40 yards away. That was a shift that put the Bobcats back up by 27. The Eagles then went 68 yards in two plays ending in a Derwin Burgess Jr. 65 yard touchdown reception. Then, after a successful onside kick they got to with 13 when Brin found Jjay Mcafee in the endzone. Ohio's ensuing drive lasted only four plays and set Georgia Southern up with a chance as they got the ball back with 9:01 remaining. They reached the Ohio 45 but failed on a fourth down pass attempt. Rickey Hunt's Ohio record fifth touchdown of the game provided the final 20 point margin. It was Ohio's fifth straight bowl win.

Hunt's 115 yards and 5 TDs with four if those coming on the ground won him the game's MVP and came in his first extended playing time of his career. His 5 TD's tied the record in bowl games and set an Ohio program record. Navarro also played well in his first collegiate with start with 11 competitions on 16 attempts for 120 yards and 71 rushing yards. Brin threw for 350 yards, bringing his total for the year to 3,781, but his three interceptions and lost fumble provided much of the difference in the game. Georgia Southern outgained Ohio by 21 yards but Ohio won the turnover battle 5–0, held the Eagles to 1.6 yards per rush attempt, and, with 232 total rushing yards, held the ball for almost seven more minutes. Bryce Houston, in his final game, led the Bobcat defense won eight tackles. Ohio sacked Brin five times.

== Statistics ==
Final Statistics through December 16, 2023

=== Team ===
	Ohio	Opp
Scoring	316	206
Points per game	24.31	15.85
First downs	272	186
Rushing	114	67
Passing	127	97
Penalty	31	22
Rushing yards	2147	1533
Avg per play	3.9	3.2
Avg per game	144.4	91.2
Rushing touchdowns	18	9
Passing yards	2647	2371
Att-Comp-Int	383-239-9	372-234-15
Avg per pass	6.91	6.37
Avg per catch	11.08	10.13
Avg per game	203.62	182.38
Passing touchdowns	16	14
Total offense	4524	3556
Avg per play	5.2	4.8
Avg per game	348.0	273.5
Fumbles-Lost	8-4	15-7
Penalties-Yards	73-673	82-787
Avg per game	51.77	60.54

	Ohio	Opp
Punts-Yards	48-1936	52-2130
Avg per punt	35.56	39.02
Time of possession/Game	33:25	26:23
3rd down conversions	84-184	49-161
4th down conversions	8-16	15-31
Touchdowns scored	37	24
Field goals-Attempts	19-28	13-20
PAT-Attempts	35-36	24-25
Attendance		
Games/Avg per Game		
Neutral Site		

=== Individual Leaders ===
==== Passing ====
Passing statistics
#	NAME	GP	RAT	CMP	ATT	YDS	AVG/G	CMP%	TD	INT	LONG
7	Kurtis Rourke	11	132.47	195	307	2207	200.64	63.52%	11	5	50
10	CJ Harris	2	94.76	25	49	248	124.00	51.02%	2	3	22
13	Parker Navarro	6	159.38	18	26	185	30.83	69.23%	3	0	32
19	Miles Cross	11	158.80	1	1	7	0.64	100.00%	0	0	7
	TOTALS	13	129.54	239	383	2647	203.62	62.40%	16	9	50

==== Rushing ====
Rushing statistics
#	NAME	GP	ATT	GAIN	AVG	TD	LONG	AVG/G
5	Sieh Bangura	12	178	811	4.6	7	26	67.58
0	O'Shaan Allison	12	139	452	3.3	3	30	37.67
7	Kurtis Rourke	11	67	219	3.3	4	25	19.91
13	Parker Navarro	6	25	178	7.1	0	52	29.67
28	Rickey Hunt	3	23	134	5.8	4	40	44.67
10	CJ Harris	2	12	55	4.6	0	23	27.5
21	Nolan McCormick	1	11	40	3.6	0	17	40.00
4	Tyler Walton	12	5	34	6.9	0	15	2.83
6	Quintell Quinn	7	5	22	4.4	0	8	3.14
48	Tristan Cox	12	1	7	7.0	0	7	0.58
87	Will Kacmarek	13	1	5	5.0	0	5	3.14
12	Sam Wiglusz	12	1	1	1.0	0	1	0.08
24	Jared Wheatley	13	1	-15	-15.0	0	0	-1.15
	Team	12	15	-66	-4.4	0	0	-5.50
	TOTALS	13	485	1877	3.9	18	52	144.38

==== Receiving ====
Receiving statistics
#	NAME	GP	CTH	YDS	AVG	TD	LONG	AVG/G
12	Sam Wiglusz	12	56	660	11.79	3	38	55.00
19	Miles Cross	11	47	599	12.72	5	42	54.45
4	Ty Walton	12	37	349	9.43	2	27	29.08
87	Will Kacmerek	13	22	243	11.05	2	36	18.69
86	Tyler Foster	11	20	211	10.55	0	50	19.18
5	Sieh Bangura	12	18	159	8.83	1	29	13.25
8	Jacoby Jones	3	8	147	18.38	0	42	49.00
16	Chase Hendricks	13	11	108	9.82	0	20	8.31
0	O'Shaan Allison	12	9	24	2.67	0	7	2.00
28	Rickey Hunt	3	2	21	10.50	1	18	7.00
14	Bryce Butler	13	3	15	5.00	1	9	1.15
7	Kurtis Rourke	11	1	7	7.00	0	7	0.64
3	Keegan Wilburn	10	1	4	4.00	0	4	0.40
11	Rodney Harris II	8	1	4	4.00	0	0	0.50
11	Keegan Wilburn	11	1	4	4.00	0	0	0.36
37	TOTALS	13	239	2647	11.08	16	50	203.62

==== Defense ====
Defense statistics
#	NAME	GP	SOLO	AST	TOT	TFL-YDS	SACK-YDS	INT	BU	QBH	FR	FF	BLK	SAF	TD
32	Bryce Houston	13	59	68	127	12.5-45	2.5-19	3	1	5	0	1	0	0	
38	Keye Thompson	12	42	52	94	10.0-29	1.5-9	1	2	4	3	1	0	0	
26	Walter Reynolds	13	26	45	71	1.5-3	0-0	2	2	0	0	0	0	0	
21	Austin Brawley	9	15	24	39	0.5-1	0-0	2	2	0	1	0	0	0	
22	Adonis Williams Jr.	12	20	19	39	3.5-14	1.5-8	1	2	3	0	0	0	0	
7	Torrie Cox Jr.	12	21	15	36	2.0-3	1.5-3	1	1	0	0	1	0	0	
94	Bradley Weaver	13	17	17	34	13.0-42	6.0-20	0	0	7	0	1	0	0	
17	Vonnie Watkins	13	15	18	33	8.0-37	5.0-29	0	0	11	0	2	0	0	
28	Shane Bonner	13	17	13	30	8.5-41	4.5-34	1	0	6	0	0	0	0	
0	Rayyan Buell	13	12	18	30	12.5-55	4.5-25	0	0	3	0	0	0	0	
8	Justin Birchette	12	16	13	29	2.5-6	0-0	0	9	0	0	0	0	0	
3	Jeremiah Wood	10	9	17	26	2.5-10	0-0	1	4	2	0	1	0	0	
81	Bralen Henderson	12	8	13	21	2.0-6	1.0-6	0	0	2	0	1	0	0	
5	Rodney Mathews	13	3	17	20	4.5-17	0.5-5	1	1	4	0	0	0	0	
4	Roman Parodie	13	11	9	20	2.0-5	0-0	0	1	0	2	1	0	0	
35	Shay Taylor	11	9	11	20	1.5-9	1.0-9	0	0	0	1	1	0	0	
14	Kwame Sutton	10	5	14	19	2.5-9	2.0-8	0	0	2	0	0	0	0	
30	Ben Johnson	13	3	14	17	0-0	0-0	0	0	0	0	0	0	0	
12	Tank Pearson	13	8	8	16	1.5-3	0-0	2	1	0	0	0	0	0	
48	Tristan Cox	12	3	6	9	1.0-2	0.5-1	0	0	3	0	0	0	0	
25	Michael Molnar	13	1	8	9	0-0	0-0	0	0	0	0	0	0	0	
10	John Motton	13	4	4	8	0-0	0-0	0	0	0	0	0	0	0	
34	Dylan Stevens	13	4	3	7	0-0	0-0	0	0	0	0	0	0	0	
9	Caden Campolieti	12	2	4	6	0-0	0-0	0	0	0	0	0	0	0	
49	Jalen Thomeson	8	2	4	6	0-0	0-0	0	0	1	0	0	0	0	
11	Kobi Gorman	10	4	1	5	1.0-9	1.0-9	0	0	0	0	0	0	0	
6	Dontay Hunter II	7	3	2	5	2.0-9	2.0-9	0	0	1	0	0	0	0	
39	Mekah Ryder	10	0	5	5	0-0	0-0	0	1	0	0	0	0	0	
13	Kaci Seegars	10	1	3	4	0-0	0-0	0	0	1	0	1	0	0	
5	Sieh Bangura	12	2	0	2	0-0	0-0	0	0	0	0	0	0	0	
47	Alex Kasee	13	2	0	2	0-0	0-0	0	0	0	0	0	0	0	
3	Keegan Wilburn	11	0	2	2	0-0	0-0	0	0	0	0	0	0	0	
20	Kendall Bannister	3	1	0	1	0-0	0-0	0	0	0	0	0	0	0	
14	Bryce Butler	13	1	0	1	0-0	0-0	0	0	0	0	0	0	0	
29	Miles Fleming	12	1	0	1	0-0	0-0	0	0	0	0	0	0	0	
23	Ryan Logan	1	1	0	1	0-0	0-0	0	0	0	0	0	0	0	
31	Andrew Marshall	1	1	0	1	0-0	0-0	0	0	0	0	0	0	0	
13	Parker Navarro	6	1	0	1	0-0	0-0	0	0	0	0	0	0	0	
6	Quintell Quinn	7	1	0	1	0-0	0-0	0	0	0	0	0	0	0	
64	Shedrick Rhodes	13	1	0	1	0-0	0-0	0	0	0	0	0	0	0	
19	Kadin Schmitz	11	1	0	1	1.0-8	1.0-8	0	0	2	0	0	0	0	
42	DJ Walker	4	0	1	1	0-0	0-0	0	0	0	0	0	0	0	
0	O'Shaan Allison	12	0	0	0	0-0	0-0	0	0	0	0	0	0	0	
19	Miles Cross	11	0	0	0	0-0	0-0	0	0	0	0	0	0	0	
28	Rickey Hunt	3	0	0	0	0-0	0-0	0	0	0	0	0	0	0	
87	Will Kacmarek	13	0	0	0	0-0	0-0	0	0	0	0	0	0	0	
7	Kurtis Rourke	11	0	0	0	0-0	0-0	0	0	0	0	0	0	0	
44	Gianni Spetic	12	0	0	0	0-0	0-0	0	0	0	0	0	0	0	
4	Tyler Walton	12	0	0	0	0-0	0-0	0	0	0	0	0	0	0	
24	Jared Wheatley	13	0	0	0	0-0	0-0	0	0	0	0	0	0	0	
12	Sam Wiglusz	12	0	0	0	0-0	0-0	0	0	0	0	0	0	0	
85	Mason Williams	5	0	0	0	0-0	0-0	0	0	0	0	0	0	0	
	Total	13	353	448	801	96.0-363	36.0-202	15	27	57	7	11	0	0	
	Opponents	13	393	540	933	66.0-228	15.0-96	9	45	52	4	5	2	0	

Key: POS: Position, SOLO: Solo Tackles, AST: Assisted Tackles, TOT: Total Tackles, TFL: Tackles-for-loss, SACK: Quarterback Sacks, INT: Interceptions, BU: Passes Broken Up, PD: Passes Defended, QBH: Quarterback Hits, FR: Fumbles Recovered, FF: Forced Fumbles, BLK: Kicks or Punts Blocked, SAF: Safeties, TD : Touchdown

==== Special teams ====
Kicking statistics
#	NAME	GP	XPM	XPA	XP%	FGM	FGA	FG%	1–19	20–29	30–39	40–49	50+	LNG
44	Gianni Spetic	13	33	34	97.0%	18	26	69.23%	2/2	11/12	4/6	1/4	0/2	40
47	Alex Kasee	13	2	2	100.0%	1	2	50.00%	0/0	0/0	1/1	0/1	0/0	39
	TOTALS		35	36	97.2%	19	28	67.86%	2/2	11/12	5/7	1/5	0/2	40

Kickoff statistics
#	NAME	GP	KICKS	YDS	AVG	TB	OB
47	Alex Kasee	13	67	3769	56.3	13	1
	TOTALS		67	3769	56.3	13	1

Punting statistics
#	NAME	GP	PUNTS	YDS	AVG	LONG	TB	I–20	50+	BLK
43	Jack Wilson		29	1237	42.66	58	3	12	8	0
24	Jared Wheatley		19	699	36.79	48	0	7	0	0
	TOTALS		48	1936	40.33	58	3	19	8	0

Kick return statistics
#	NAME	GP	RTNS	YDS	AVG	TD	LNG
3	Keegan Wilburn	-	10	179	17.90	0	28
12	Tank Pearson	-	2	44	22.00	0	28
28	Ricky Hunt	-	1	19	19.00	0	19
30	Ron Johnson	-	1	16	16.00	0	16
12	Sam Wiglusz	-	1	15	15.00	0	15
	TOTALS		15	273	18.20	0	28

Punt return statistics
#	NAME	GP	RTNS	YDS	AVG	TD	LONG
4	Ty Walton	-	13	37	2.85	0	9
12	Tank Pearson	-	1	4	4.00	0	4
84	Aramoni Rhone	-	1	0	0.00	0	0
	TOTALS		15	41	2.73	0	9

== Personnel ==
=== Coaching staff ===
Since July 14, 2021, the head coach of the Ohio Bobcats has been Tim Albin. He heads a staff of ten assistant coaches, four graduate assistants, a director of football operations, and numerous other support staff.

Name	Position	Years at Ohio	Alma mater
Tim Albin	Head coach	2005	Northwestern Oklahoma State University 1989
Spence Nowinsky	Associate Head Coach/Defensive coordinator/defensive ends	2022	Minnesota State University, Mankato 1994
Scott Isphording	Offensive coordinator/quarterbacks	2014	Hanover College 1994
Allen Rudolph	Co-offensive coordinator/offensive line	2019	University of Southern Mississippi 1995
Dwayne Dixon	Wide receivers	2007	University of Florida 1985
Tremayne Scott	Defensive tackles	2018	Ohio University 2012
John Hauser	Safeties	2022	Wittenberg University 2002
Brian Smith	Running backs/passing game coordinator	2022	University of Hawaii 2002
DeAngelo Smith	Cornerbacks/director of player development	2017	University of Cincinnati 2008
Nate Faanes	Special teams coordinator/linebackers	2019	Winona State University 2015
Brian Metz	Tight ends	2020	University of Notre Dame 2013
Jeremiah Covington	Assistant athletic director for football operations	2022	Wingate University 2011
Kyle Pollack	Director of recruiting & video operations	2020	Penn State University
Kyle Obly	Graduate assistant – offense		
Jake Roney	Graduate assistant – offense		
Clay Finney	Graduate assistant – defense		
Danny Orrock	Graduate assistant – defense		
Jake Miller	Director of strength and conditioning	2021	Baker University
Sarah Newgarde	Director of athletics communications (football, wrestling, baseball)	2021	Ohio University
Matthias Reiber	Head football athletic trainer	2021	Bowling Green State University
Jerry Lin	Staff Athletic trainer (football, swim & dive)		
Will Fife	Director of equipment		
Caleb Moon	Assistant director of equipment		
Thomas Turnbaugh	Director of video and recruiting services	2018	Ohio University
Jessica Arquette	Ohio athletics sports dietitian		Bowling Green State University
Kaitlyn Michener	Nutritionist		
Hannah Rastatter	Nutritionist		
Elaine Goodfellow	Administrative assistant		
Quentin Singleton	Football Operations Assistant		
Joseph Benish	Staff Athletic Trainer (Football/Track)		
Ben Gilkey	Assistant Strength and Conditioning Coach		
John Bowman	Director of Sports Medicine & Athletics Health Care Administrator	1994	Ohio University
Dr. Sergio Ulloa	Team Orthopedic Physician		
Dr. Katherine Guran	Head Team Physician		
James Odenthal	Staff Physical Therapist	2010	Ohio University

=== Roster ===
2023 Ohio Bobcats football roster

Quarterback

- 7 Kurtis Rourke – Gr. (6'5", 231 lb.) Oakville, Ontario, Canada / Holy Trinity
- 9 Callum Wither – R-Fr. (6'4", 205 lb.) Mississauga, Ontario / Clarkson Football North
- 10 CJ Harris – Gr. (6'4", 220 lb.) West Bloomfield, Mich. / West Bloomfield
- 13 Parker Navarro – Gr. (6'0", 203 lb.) Tempe, Ariz. / Desert Vista
- 15 Jacob Winters – Fr. (6'2", 226 lb.) Jackson, Ohio / Jackson

Running Back

- 0 O'Shaan Allison – Red 5th (5'9", 211 lb.) Malvern, Pa. / Malvern Prep
- 5 Sieh Bangura – R-So. (6'0", 209 lb.) Bowie, Md. / Dematha Catholic High School
- 6 Quintell Quinn – R-So. (6'1", 217 lb.) Columbus, Ohio / St. Francis DeSales High School
- 21 Nolan McCormick – R-So. (5'11", 214 lb.) Mason, Ohio / William Mason
- 26 Bryce Kitrell – R-Jr. (5'11", 195 lb.) Ashland, Neb. / Ashland-Greenwood
- 28 Rickey Hunt – Fr. (5'11", 203 lb.) Oklahoma City, Oklahoma / Millwood
- 41 Devon Hunter – R-So. (5'11", 205 lb.) Avon, Ohio / Avon
- 48 Aginon Wilson Jr. – Fr. (5'10", 203 lb.) Cleveland, Ohio / Cleveland Heights

Wide Receiver

- 3 Keegan Wilburn – Gr. (5'10", 183 lb.) Nelsonville, Ohio / Nelsonville-York
- 4 Tyler Walton – Red 5th (5'10", 187 lb.) St. Louis, Mo. / Christian Brothers
- 8 Jacoby Jones – Sr. (6'3", 228 lb.) Tunica, Miss. /
- 11 Rodney Harris II – R-Fr. (6'2", 208 lb.) Cincinnati, Ohio / Princeton High School
- 12 Sam Wiglusz – Gr. (6'0", 183 lb.) Brecksville, Ohio / Brecksville
- 16 Chase Hendricks – Fr. (6'0", 195 lb.) St. Louis, Mo. / St. Mary's
- 17 Jalien Hammer – Jr. (-, 204 lb.) /
- 18 Major Brown – R-Jr. (6'2", 216 lb.) Gahanna, Ohio / Gahanna Lincoln
- 19 Miles Cross – Jr. (6'1", 213 lb.) Bowie, Md. / Rock Hill High School (S.C.)
- 20 Jack Borer – Fr. (6'2", 193 lb.) Perrysburg, Ohio / Perrysburg
- 23 Desmond Duffy – Fr. (5'8", 189 lb.) Carmel, Indiana / Carmel
- 25 KJ Howard – Jr. (5'7", 167 lb.) Cincinnati, Ohio / LaSalle
- 80 Ryan McDole – R-Fr. (6'4", 210 lb.) Cincinnati, Ohio / Turpin
- 81 Matthew Stuewe – Fr. (6'2", 192 lb.) Avon Lake, Ohio / Avon Lake
- 83 Christian Hilton – So. (6'1", 200 lb.) /
- 84 Aramoni Rhone – R-So. (6'5", 196 lb.) Orlando, Fla. / Plant City High School
- 88 Caleb Gossett – R-So. (6'2", 202 lb.) Lewis Center, Ohio / Olentangy
- 89 Khamani Debrow – Fr. (6'2", 189 lb.) /

Tight End

- 2 Alec Burton – Gr. (6'4", 246 lb.) Danville, Ind. / Danville
- 14 Bryce Butler – R-So. (6'2", 258 lb.) Bowie, Md. / St. John's College High School
- 40 Mason Williams – Fr. (6'5", 252 lb.) Mogadore, Ohio / Mogadore
- 44 Declan Malenchek – Fr. (6'5", 200 lb.) /
- 82 Kyle Fullam – R-Fr. (6'5", 237 lb.) Vandalia, Ohio / Butler Senior High School
- 86 Tyler Foster – R-Sr. (6'7", 249 lb.) Pickerington, Ohio / Pickerington
- 87 Will Kacmarek – R-So. (6'6", 256 lb.) St. Louis, Mo. / Mary Institute and Saint Louis Country Day School

Offensive lineman

- 51 Davion Weatherspoon – R-So. (6'0", 295 lb.) Harper Woods, Mich. / Harper Woods High School
- 52 Dane Jackson – Fr. (-, 297 lb.) /
- 53 Jay Amburgey – Gr. (6'6", 305 lb.) Reynoldsburg, Ohio / Reynoldsburg
- 54 Joe Oakes – Gr. (6'4", 289 lb.) Cincinnati, Ohio / Indian Hill
- 56 Hark Sohi – R-So. (6'7", 278 lb.) /
- 60 Demond Arter – R-Jr. (6'4", 313 lb.) Elkridge, Md. / St. John's (Washington DC)
- 61 Kaden Rogers – R-So. (6'3", 293 lb.) Hamilton, Ohio / Ross High School
- 64 Shedrick Rhodes Jr. – R-Jr. (6'6", 322 lb.) McDonough, Ga. / Eagle's Landing Christian Academy
- 65 Jake Skelly – R-So. (6'4", 284 lb.) Columbus, Ohio / Bishop Harley High School
- 66 Christophe Atkinson – R-Sr. (6'4", 318 lb.) Leesburg, Va. / Tuscarora
- 67 Kam Wright – R-Fr. (6'4", 333 lb.) Granville, Ohio / Granville
- 69 Parker Titsworth – R-Sr. (6'1", 298 lb.) Wexford, Pa. / North Allegheny
- 71 Aidan Johnson – Fr. (6'3", 316 lb.) Elkridge, Maryland / Good Counsel
- 72 Kurt Danneker – Gr. (6'4", 332 lb.) Linden, Pa. / Williamsport Area
- 73 Joseph Habinowski – R-Jr. (6'5", 315 lb.) Pembroke Pines, Fla. / Chaminade-Madonna College Preparatory
- 74 Joseph Watson – R-Fr. (6'0", 287 lb.) Unioto, Ohio / Unioto
- 75 Jarian Shelby – R-Fr. (6'4", 284 lb.) Luling, La. / Hahnville High School
- 77 Jacob Dennison – R-Jr. (6'5", 316 lb.) Mansfield, Ohio / Lexington

Placekicker

- 44 Gianni Spetic – Fr. (6'3", 201 lb.) Chardon, Ohio / Notre Dame Cathedral Latin
- 47 Alex Kasee – Fr. (6'2", 161 lb.) Sylvania, Ohio / Sylvania Northview

Defensive end

- 6 Dontay Hunter II – R-Sr. (6'4", 261 lb.) Westerville, Ohio / Westerville Central
- 13 Kaci Seegars – R-So. (6'2", 241 lb.) Charlotte, N.C. /
- 14 Kwame Sutton – Gr. (6'1", 244 lb.) Gaffney, S.C. /
- 15 David Patterson – R-So. (6'2", 230 lb.) Lilburn, Ga. / Parkview High School
- 17 Vonnie Watkins – Gr. (6'4", 238 lb.) Lusby, Md. / Patuxent
- 19 Kadin Schmitz – Fr. (6'1", 223 lb.) Ashland, Ohio / Ashland
- 23 Ryan Logan – So. (6'7", 236 lb.) Vandalia, Ohio / Vandalia-Butler
- 28 Shane Bonner – Gr. (6'0", 220 lb.) New Concord, Ohio / John Glenn
- 50 Owen DiFranco – Fr. (6'4", 222 lb.) Glen Ellyn, Illinois / Glenbard South
- 91 Jay Crable – Fr. (6'3", 209 lb.) Massillon, Ohio / Archbishop
- 94 Bradley Weaver – R-So. (6'4", 268 lb.) Hilliard, Ohio / Hilliard Darby High School
- 98 Danny Novickas – Fr. (6'3", 228 lb.) Chicago, Ill. / Mt. Carmel

Defensive Tackle

- 40 Gino Williams – Fr. (6'0", 260 lb.) /
- 0 Rayyan Buell – R-Sr. (6'3", 277 lb.) Hornell, N.Y. / Hornell Senior
- 5 Rodney Mathews – Gr. (6'2", 310 lb.) Memphis, Tenn. / Craigmont
- 11 Kobi Gorman – Fr. (6'2", 279 lb.) Pickerington, Ohio / Pickerington Central
- 16 Chris Mayfield – R-Jr. (6'3", 279 lb.) Hilliard, Ohio / Hilliard Bradley
- 48 Tristan Cox – R-So. (-, 274 lb.) /
- 55 Jordon Jones – R-Fr. (6'3", 297 lb.) Ashland, Ky. / Paul G. Blazer
- 81 Bralen Henderson – R-So. (6'2", 276 lb.) Pittsburgh, Pa. / Central Catholic High School
- 92 RJ Keuchler – Fr. (6'5", 268 lb.) /
- 95 Dane Middlebrook – R-Jr. (6'0", 330 lb.) Indianapolis, Ind. / Brownsburg
- 97 Austin Mitchell – Fr. (6'2", 245 lb.) Avon, Ohio / Avon
- 99 Joey Woolard – R-Jr. (6'1", 295 lb.) Grove City, Ohio / Grove City

Linebacker

- 9 Caden Campolieti – R-Sr. (6'1", 223 lb.) Cleveland, Ohio / Saint Ignatius
- 25 Michael Molnar – R-Fr. (6'3", 213 lb.) Mason, Ohio / Mason
- 27 Jack Fries – R-Fr. (6'2", 210 lb.) Cincinnati, Ohio / LaSalle
- 31 Andrew Marshall – Fr. (6'3", 226 lb.) Carroll, Ohio / Bloom Carroll
- 32 Bryce Houston – Gr. (6'0", 246 lb.) Lewis Center, Ohio / Olentangy Orange
- 33 Brady Sestilli – Fr. (6'4", 186 lb.) Delaware, Ohio / Dublin Jerome
- 34 Dylan Stevens – R-Jr. (5'10", 206 lb.) Powell, Ohio / Olentangy Liberty
- 35 Shay Taylor – R-So. (6'3", 218 lb.) Mount Perry, Ohio / Sheridan High School
- 38 Keye Thompson – Gr. (6'1", 239 lb.) Barberton, Ohio / Barberton
- 46 Chase Hall – Fr. (-, lb.) Kitts Hill, Ohio / Dawson-Bryant
- 90 Geo Loya – So. (6'2", 200 lb.) /
- 93 Lukas Stiles – Fr. (-, lb.) Wadsworth, Ohio / Highland

Cornerback

- 4 Roman Parodie – R-Jr. (6'2", 194 lb.) Fort Lauderdale, Fla. / Cardinal Gibbons
- 7 Torrie Cox Jr. – R-So. (5'8", 172 lb.) Miami Gardens, Fla. / | Chaminade-Madonna Preparatory School
- 8 Justin Birchette – Gr. (5'9", 184 lb.) Palm Beach Gardens, Fla. / Dwyer
- 12 Tank Pearson – Jr. (5'9", 171 lb.) Oxford, Mississippi /
- 20 Kendall Bannister – Fr. (5'11", 172 lb.) Woodbridge, Virginia / Freedom
- 24 Toby Adensaya – Fr. (5'10", 178 lb.) Ellicott City, M.D. / Marriots Ridge
- 39 Mekah Ryder – So. (6'2", 181 lb.) McKinney, Texas / McKinney High School
- 41 Creed Hill – Fr. (5'10", 170 lb.) Medina, Ohio / Highland

Safety

- 2 Nife Oseni – R-Jr. (5'9", 195 lb.) Rolling Meadows, Ill. / Rolling Meadows
- 3 Jeremiah Wood – 6th (6'1", 210 lb.) Pickerington, Ohio / Pickerington Central
- 10 John Motton – R-So. (5'10", 207 lb.) Groveport, Ohio / Groveport-Madison High School
- 18 Bailey Russ – R-So. (6'2", 204 lb.) Cuyahoga Falls, Ohio / Walsh Jesuit
- 21 Austin Brawley – So. (6'0", 176 lb.) Massillon, Ohio / Massillon Washington
- 22 Adonis Williams Jr. – So. (6'2", 202 lb.) South Euclid, Ohio / Cleveland Heights
- 26 Walter Reynolds – Gr. (6'1", 196 lb.) Detroit, Michigan / Detroit Jesuit
- 29 Miles Fleming – R-Jr. (-, 191 lb.) /
- 30 Ben Johnson – R-Sr. (6'3", 205 lb.) Pickerington, Ohio / Pickerington North
- 36 Cam Dorsey – R-Jr. (6'1", 215 lb.) Alpharetta, Ga. / Alpharetta
- 37 Xander Karagosian – R-Fr. (6'1", 201 lb.) Jackson, Ohio / Alexander and Jackson
- 42 DJ Walker – Fr. (6'1", 171 lb.) Aliquippa, Pa. / Aliquippa
- 49 Jalen Thomeson – Fr. (5'11", 181 lb.) Greenwood, Indiana / Center Grove

Punter

- 24 Jared Wheatley – Gr. (6'1", 202 lb.) Indian Trail, N.C. / Porter Ridge
- 43 Jack Wilson – R-Jr. (5'11", 224 lb.) Lancefield, Victoria, Australia / Gisborne Secondary College (ProKick Australia)

Long Snapper

- 31 Justin Holloway – 6th (6'3", 206 lb.) Venice, Fla. / Venice
- 45 Ben Bergfeld – R-Fr. (5'8", 241 lb.) Davenport, Iowa / Davenport North

As of August 19 - Source:

=== Depth chart ===
Defense

FS
Walter Reynolds
Ben Johnson
-

NICKEL	WLB	MLB
Adonis Williams Jr.	Bryce Houston	Keye Thompson
Jeremiah Wood	Michael Molnar; Caden Campolieti	Shay Taylor
-	-	Dylan Stevens

SS
Austin Brawley
Miles Fleming
-

CB
Justin Birchette
Tank Pearson
-

DE	DT	DT	DE
Vonnie Watkins	Rodney Mathews	Rayyan Buell	Shane Bonner
Bradley Weaver	Kobi Gorman	Bralen Henderson	Kadin Schmitz
-	-	Tristan Cox	Kaci Seegars

CB
Torrie Cox, Jr.
Roman Parodie
-

Offense

WR-F
Sam Wiglusz
Tyler Walton
Keegan Wilburn

WR-X
Miles Cross
Aramoni Rhone
Khamani Debrow

LT	LG	C	RG	RT
Jay Amburgey	Kurt Danneker	Parker Titsworth	Christophe Atkinson	Shedrick Rhodes Jr.
Jacob Dennison	Kaden Rogers	Dane Jackson	Davion Weatherspoon	Joseph Habinowski
-	-	Kam Wright	-	-

TE
Tyler Foster
Will Kacmarek
Bryce Butler

WR-Z
Chase Hendricks
Rodney Harris
-

QB
Kurtis Rourke
Parker Navarro
-

RB
Sieh Bangura
O’Shaan Allison
Rickey Hunt
Quintell Quinn

Special teams
PK Gianni Spetic
Alex Kasee
P Jared Wheatley
Jack Wilson
KR Keegan Wilburn
Austin Brawley
PR Tyler Walton
Tank Pearson
LS Justin Holloway
Ben Bergfeld

For homecoming game vs. Kent State - Source:

== Awards and honors ==
=== Weekly awards ===
Award	Player	Position	Year	Date	Source
MAC East Offensive Player of the Week	Sieh Bangura	RB	R-So.	Sept. 4	
MAC East Defensive Player of the Week	Bryce Houston	LB	Grad.	Sept. 4	
MAC East Defensive Player of the Week	Bryce Houston	LB	Grad.	Sept. 18	
MAC East Defensive Player of the Week	Keye Thompson	LB	Grad.	Sept. 25	
MAC East Offensive Player of the Week	Miles Cross	WR	Jr.	Oct. 9	
MAC East Special Teams Player of the Week	Jack Wilson	P	R-Jr.	Oct. 23	
MAC East Defensive Player of the Week	Keye Thompson	LB	Grad.	Nov. 10	
MAC East Offensive Player of the Week	Sieh Bangura	RB	R-So.	Nov. 20	
MAC East Offensive Player of the Week	Kurtis Rourke	RB	Grad.	Nov. 27	
MAC East Special Teams Player of the Week	Jack Wilson	P	R-Jr.	Nov. 27	
Myrtle Beach Bowl MVP	Rickey Hunt Jr.	RB	Fr.	Dec. 16	

=== Midseason Award watch lists ===
Award	Player	Position	Year
Broyles Award	Spence Nowinsky	DC	

=== Award Finalists ===
Award	Player	Position	Year
Jon Cornish Trophy	Kurtis Rourke	QB	GS

=== All-MAC awards ===
Postseason All-MAC teams
Award	Player	Position	Year
All-MAC First Team Offense	Sam Wiglusz	WR	GS
All-MAC First Team Defense	Bryce Houston	LB	GS
All-MAC First Team Defense	Keye Thompson	LB	GS
2022 All-MAC Second Team Offense	Kurtis Rourke	QB	GS
2022 All-MAC Third Team Defense	Vonnie Watkins	DE	GS
2022 All-MAC Third Team Defense	Rayyan Buell	DT	R-Sr.

=== National awards ===
National Award Honors
Honors	Player	Position	Ref.
CFN Third Team All-American	Bryce Houston	CB	

== Rankings ==
Ranking movements Legend: ██ Increase in ranking ██ Decrease in ranking — = Not ranked RV = Received votes
	Week															
Poll	Pre	1	2	3	4	5	6	7	8	9	10	11	12	13	14	Final
AP	—	—	—	—	—	—	—	—	—	—	—	—	—	—	—	RV
Coaches	—	—	—	RV	—	RV	RV	—	—	—	—	—	—	—	—	—
CFP	Not released									—	—	—	—	—	—	Not released

Source: AP -

Coaches -

CFP -
