= Parker Navarro =

American football player (born 2001)

Profile
- Position: Quarterback

Personal information
- Born: November 16, 2001 (age 24)
- Listed height: 6 ft 0 in (1.83 m)
- Listed weight: 211 lb (96 kg)

Career information
- High school: Desert Vista (Phoenix, Arizona)
- College: UCF (2020–2021); Ohio (2022–2025)

Awards and highlights
- 2× Second-team All-MAC (2024, 2025)
- Stats at ESPN

Parker Navarro (born November 16, 2001) is an American former college football quarterback. He previously played for the UCF Knights and Ohio Bobcats.

== Early life ==
Navarro attended Desert Vista in Phoenix, Arizona, where he was a two-year starter at quarterback. As a junior in 2018, he passed for 1,568 yards and 15 touchdowns, while also rushing for 284 yards.

In his senior season in 2019, he passed for 2,749 yards and 29 touchdowns, while rushing for 959 yards and 11 touchdowns, leading Desert Vista to a 9–4 record and an appearance in the Arizona 6A semifinals.

As a three-star recruit, he committed to the University of Central Florida (UCF).

== College career ==
During the 2020 UCF season, he played in just one game while redshirting. The following season, as the third-string quarterback, he appeared in five games, playing behind future Heisman Trophy finalist Dillon Gabriel and later Mikey Keene. He contributed notably on the ground, with three rushing touchdowns.

He transferred to Ohio prior to the 2022 season where he spent his first two seasons backing up Kurtis Rourke. He appeared in two games in 2022 as the primary backup before suffering a season ending injury against Penn State. After the 2023 season, he started the Myrtle Beach Bowl against Georgia Southern after Rourke transferred to Indiana. He threw for 120 and rushed for 71 more yards, leading Ohio to a bowl win.

Navarro entered 2024 as Ohio's starting quarterback. He got off to a sluggish start with the low point being throwing three first half interceptions against FCS Morgan State in a game in which he was benched in the second half in favor of Nick Poulos. Ohio suffered a loss in its third MAC game of the season against rival Miami in a game where Poulos also saw significant playing time. After the loss to Miami, Ohio finished season on a seven-game winning streak, where he stepped up substantially and led Ohio first MAC Championship since 1968, with a title game win over Miami, and a bowl win. Navarro won MAC Offensive Player of the week four times during the season and also was the Offensive MVP of the MAC Championship game and the MVP of the 2024 Cure Bowl win over Conference USA champion Jacksonville State. He finished the year with 2,423 passing yards and 13 touchdowns along with 1,054 rushing yards and 18 rushing touchdowns. He was second-team All-MAC.

Navarro announced he would return to Ohio for the 2025 season. He entered the year with a 12–2 record as a starting quarterback. Navarro led the Bobcats to a 9–4 overall record and tied for second in the MAC standings, throwing for 2,375 yards and rushing for 882 more yards. In his final game with Ohio, they defeated UNLV 17–10 in the Frisco Bowl. Navarro ended his career with Ohio with a 21–6 record as a starting quarterback. He entered the transfer portal on January 16, 2026, but was denied a waiver for an additional season. He was named a second-team Academic All-American on January 26.

=== Statistics ===
Season	Team	Games			Passing								Rushing			
Season	Team	GP	GS	Record	Cmp	Att	Pct	Yds	Y/A	TD	Int	Rtg	Att	Yds	Avg	TD
2020	UCF	1	0	—	Redshirted (redshirt)											
2021	UCF	5	0	—	1	2	50.0	4	2.0	0	0	66.8	7	54	7.7	3
2022	Ohio	2	0	—	5	12	41.7	43	3.6	0	0	71.8	9	-4	-0.4	0
2023	Ohio	6	1	1−0	18	26	69.2	185	7.1	3	1	159.4	25	178	7.1	0
2024	Ohio	13	13	11−2	195	295	66.1	2,423	8.2	13	11	142.2	160	1,046	6.5	18
2025	Ohio	13	13	9−4	188	303	62.0	2,375	7.8	14	11	135.9	160	886	5.5	9
Career		40	27	21−6	407	638	63.8	5,030	7.9	30	23	138.3	361	2,160	6.0	30
