= Spence Nowinsky =

American football player and coach (born 1971)

Current position
- Title: Defensive Coordinator
- Team: New Mexico
- Conference: Mountain West

Biographical details
- Born: September 14, 1971 (age 55)
- Education: Minnesota State

Playing career
- 1991–1994: Minnesota State
- Position: Defensive Line

Coaching career (HC unless noted)
- 1995–1996: Lake Crystal Wellcome HS (MN) (assistant)
- 1997–1998: Wittenberg-Birnamwood HS (WI) (assistant)
- 1999–2002: Wisconsin (GA)
- 2003: Idaho (DL)
- 2004: Minnesota State (DL)
- 2005: Minnesota State (DL/OL)
- 2006: Minnesota State (DL)
- 2007–2008: Emporia State (AHC/DL)
- 2009–2017: Illinois State (DC/DL)
- 2018–2021: Miami (OH) (DC/LB)
- 2022–2023: Ohio (DC/DL)
- 2024: Memphis (co-DC/DL)
- 2025–present: New Mexico (DC/LB)

Spence Nowinsky is an American college football coach and former player. He is the defensive coordinator and linebacker coach for the New Mexico, positions he has held since 2025. Previously he was the defensive coordinator at the University of Memphis, Ohio University, Miami University, and Illinois State University.

== Playing career ==
Nowinsky is an alumnus of the Minnesota State where he played college football from 1991 to 1994 as a defensive lineman.

== Coaching career ==
Nowisky's first coaching position was as an assistant at Lake Crystal-Wellcome Memorial High School in Minnesota from 1995 to 1997 He coached Wittenberg-Birnamwood High School in Wisconsin as an assistant from 1997 to 1999. His first college coaching job was as a Graduate Assistant at Wisconsin from 1999 through 2002. He spent one season as the defensive line coach for the Idaho Vandals in 2003. He held the same position with his alma mater, Minnesota State, from 2004 to 2006. He was the assistant head coach at Emporia State from 2007 to 2008. His first position as a Division 1 defensive coordinator was at Illinois State from 2009 though 2017.

On December 13, 2017, Nowinsky was hired as defensive coordinator and linebackers coach at Miami University. Miami's defenses were solid during his tenure. During his first season, Miami finished fourth in scoring defense and fifth in total defense in the MAC. The following year they were even better finishing second in scoring a third in total defense. Miami also won the MAC championship that year, and lost in the LendingTree Bowl. In 2020 and 2021 Miami finished third in the MAC in total defense both years.

On January 20, 2022, he accepted the position of defensive coordinator and defensive line coach at Ohio. In his first season at Ohio he installed a new scheme and the Bobcats struggled to adapt. Through six games Ohio was surrendering 40.6 points, 561 yards, and 387 passing yards per game but they still were able to get three wins in those games. In the seventh game the defense turned things around giving up only 14 points while forcing 6 turnovers, 5 of which were interceptions, and getting 5 sacks in a win over Western Michigan and continued the sudden turnaround in wins over Northern Illinois, Buffalo, Miami, Ball State, and Bowling Green. In the final six regular season games Ohio allowed 18.0 points, 321 yards, and 224 passing yards per game and helped Ohio finish MAC conference play on a seven game winning streak to earn the MAC East division title. During a 9 win regular season in 2023, Ohio's defense finished the regular season with the fifth best scoring defense in the FBS at 15.4 points per game, while allowing 96 rushing yards (8th) and 168 passing yards (7th) per game.

On April 9, 2024, Nowinsky accepted the position of co-defensive coordinator and defensive line coach at Memphis. He stayed at Memphis for only one season as he was named defensive coordinator at New Mexico on January 21, 2025.

== Personal life ==
He and his wife, Jen, have two sons, Tommy and Jack.
