= CJ Harris (American football) =

American football player (born 2002)

Profile
- Position: Quarterback

Personal information
- Born: January 25, 2002 (age 24)
- Listed height: 6 ft 4 in (1.93 m)
- Listed weight: 220 lb (100 kg)

Career information
- High school: West Bloomfield (West Bloomfield, Michigan)
- College: Ohio (2020–2023); California (2024–2025)

Awards and highlights
- Arizona Bowl MVP (2022)
- Stats at ESPN

CJ Harris (born January 25, 2002) is an American football executive and former quarterback who currently serves as an Assistant Director in the athletic department of Ohio University. He played college football for the Ohio Bobcats and California Golden Bears.

== Early life ==
Harris grew up West Bloomfield, Michigan, and attended West Bloomfield High School. He was rated a three-star recruit and committed to play college football at Ohio over offers from Central Michigan, Cornell, Dartmouth, Miami (OH) and Western Michigan.

== College career ==
During his true freshman season in 2020, Harris played in only one game against Bowling Green Falcons, where he completed one passing attempt for four yards and three rushing attempts for 16 yards. He did not play in the 2021 season. During the 2022 season, he played in seven games and made his first collegiate start against the Bowling Green Falcons, where he was named the MAC East Offensive Player of the Week and also started the 2022 MAC Championship Game and the 2022 Arizona Bowl, where he was named the game's MVP. He finished the season with 52 recorded passes for over 577 yards and three touchdowns along with 168 rushing yards and three touchdowns.

During the 2023 season, Harris played in only two games before announcing that he was done for the season due to a recent medical emergency. He finished the season with 25 recorded passes for 248 yards and two touchdowns along with 55 rushing yards.

On April 23, 2024, he entered the transfer portal. On May 8, he committed to California.

=== College statistics ===
Year	Team	Games			Passing								Rushing			
Year	Team	GP	GS	Record	Cmp	Att	Pct	Yds	Avg	TD	Int	Rtg	Att	Yds	Avg	TD
2020	Ohio	1	0	—	1	1	100.0	4	4.0	0	0	133.6	3	16	5.3	0
2021	Ohio	Did not play														
2022	Ohio	7	3	2−1	52	97	53.6	577	5.9	3	1	111.7	37	168	4.5	3
2023	Ohio	2	1	0−1	25	49	51.0	248	5.1	2	3	94.8	12	55	4.6	0
2024	California	2	1	0−1	19	31	61.3	184	5.9	0	1	104.7	18	49	2.7	0
Career		12	5	2−3	97	178	54.5	1,013	5.7	5	5	106.0	70	288	4.1	3
