= Will Kacmarek =

American football player (born 2003)

No. 89 – Miami Dolphins
- Position: Tight end
- Roster status: Active

Personal information
- Born: February 12, 2003 (age 23); St. Louis, Missouri, U.S.
- Listed height: 6 ft 5 in (1.96 m)
- Listed weight: 264 lb (120 kg)

Career information
- High school: Mary Institute and St. Louis Country Day School (Ladue, Missouri)
- College: Ohio (2021–2023); Ohio State (2024–2025)
- NFL draft: 2026: 3rd round, 87th overall pick

Career history
- Miami Dolphins (2026–present)

Awards and highlights
- CFP national champion (2024)

Career NFL statistics as of Week 4, 2026
- Receptions: 2
- Receiving yards: 19
- Stats at Pro Football Reference

William Kacmarek (born February 12, 2003) is an American professional football tight end for the Miami Dolphins of the National Football League (NFL). He played college football for the Ohio Bobcats and Ohio State Buckeyes and was selected by the Dolphins in the third round of the 2026 NFL draft.

== Early life ==
Kacmarek attended Mary Institute and St. Louis Country Day School in Ladue, Missouri. Coming out of high school, he was rated as a two-star recruit and committed to play college football for the Ohio Bobcats.

== College career ==
=== Ohio ===
As a freshman in 2021, Kacmarek took a redshirt. Over the next two seasons in 2022 and 2023, he appeared in 27 games, where he hauled in 42 passes for 507 yards and two touchdowns. After the 2023 season, Kacmarek entered his name into the NCAA transfer portal.

=== Ohio State ===
Kacmarek transferred to play for the Ohio State Buckeyes. In 2024, he played in 12 games and brought in eight receptions for 86 yards as Ohio State won the national championship. After the 2024 season, Kacmarek returned to Ohio State rather than entering the NFL draft. In week 2 of the 2025 season, he hauled in two passes for 55 yards and a touchdown in a win against Grambling State.

=== Statistics ===
Year	Team	Games		Receiving			
Year	Team	GP	GS	Rec	Yds	Avg	TD
2021	Ohio	2	0	Redshirted (redshirt)			
2022	Ohio	14	2	20	264	13.2	0
2023	Ohio	13	11	22	243	11.0	2
2024	Ohio State	12	6	8	86	10.8	0
2025	Ohio State	12	9	9	120	13.3	2
Career		53	28	59	713	12.1	4

== Professional career ==
Pre-draft measurables
Height	Weight	Arm length	Hand span	Wingspan	40-yard dash	10-yard split	20-yard split	20-yard shuttle	Three-cone drill	Vertical jump	Broad jump	Bench press
6 ft 5 1/2 in (1.97 m)	261 lb (118 kg)	32 1/4 in (0.82 m)	9 3/4 in (0.25 m)	6 ft 8 1/8 in (2.04 m)	4.74 s	1.70 s	2.78 s	4.47 s	7.34 s	36.0 in (0.91 m)	9 ft 11 in (3.02 m)	18 reps
All values from NFL Combine/Pro Day

Kacmarek was selected by the Miami Dolphins in the third round with the 87th overall pick in the 2026 NFL draft. Miami received the selection in 2025 from the Philadelphia Eagles in exchange for linebacker Jaelan Phillips.
