= Gianni Spetic =

American football player (born 2005)

No. 44 – Texas Longhorns
- Position: Placekicker
- Class: Senior

Personal information
- Born: January 22, 2005 (age 21); Chardon, Ohio, U.S.
- Listed height: 6 ft 3 in (1.91 m)
- Listed weight: 221 lb (100 kg)

Career information
- High school: Notre Dame-Cathedral Latin (Chardon, Ohio)
- College: Ohio (2023–2024); Memphis (2025); Texas (2026–present)

Awards and highlights
- Third-team All-American Conference (2025)
- Stats at ESPN

Gianni Spetic (born January 22, 2005) is an American college football placekicker for the Texas Longhorns. He previously played for the Ohio Bobcats and the Memphis Tigers.

== Early life ==
Spetic was born on January 22, 2005, in Chardon, Ohio, to John and Lucy Spetic. His grandparents emigrated to the United States from Croatia in 1968. Spetic played soccer from age two. He began kicking and punting in middle school.

Spetic attended Notre Dame-Cathedral Latin School in Chardon, where he played football, baseball, basketball, and soccer, though he gave up soccer after his sophomore year. He doubled as the kicker and the punter on the football team, converting 111 extra points and 18 field goals over his high school career. Spetic was a two-time second-team All-Ohio selection and garnered first-team All-Crown Conference honors as a senior, breaking the school record for longest field goal with a 49-yard kick. He also collected first-team all-conference honors in baseball and was a Golden Glove recipient.

Spetic was rated as a five-star recruit and ranked as the sixth-best kicker prospect in the class of 2023 by Kohl's Kicking. The same service rated him as a 4 1/2-star recruit and the 42nd-best punter prospect in the class. Spetic committed to playing college football at Ohio University over offers from Boston College and UNLV. He signed his National Letter of Intent with the Bobcats on February 1, 2023.

== College career ==
As a freshman in 2023, Spetic converted on 33-of-34 extra points and 18-of-26 field goals. In 2024, he converted 47-of-48 extra points and 13-of-16 field goals. Spetic was named the special teams MVP of the 2024 MAC Championship Game after he converted a new career-long 52-yard field goal and went five-of-five on extra points in the 38–3 win over the Miami RedHawks. It marked Ohio's first MAC championship since 1968. Spetic entered the NCAA transfer portal after the 2024 season. He committed to transferring to the University of Memphis to play for the Tigers.

Spetic entered the 2025 season as the starting kicker for the Tigers, who had recently suffered from instability at the position. He converted a career-long 55-yard field goal against Georgia State on September 6. The following month, Spetic won American Conference Special Teams Player of the Week honors after he connected on a 50-yard field goal and went six-of-six on extra points in a 45–7 win over Tulsa. He then matched his career-long with another 55-yard kick against South Florida on October 25. Spetic went a perfect 49-of-49 on extra points and 15-of-20 on field goals in 13 games played. He earned third-team All-American Conference honors and was a semifinalist for the Lou Groza Award. Spetic entered the transfer portal after the season. On January 4, 2026, he committed to transferring to the University of Texas to play for the Longhorns.

Spetic beat out freshman Jake Collet for the Longhorns' starting kicking job ahead of the 2026 season. He kicked the game-winning extra point in the final minute of a 24–23 comeback win over AP No. 1 Ohio State on September 12.

== Personal life ==
Spetic grew up as a fan of the Cleveland Browns, Cleveland Guardians, Cleveland Cavaliers, and Ohio State Buckeyes, citing Mike Trout as his favorite athlete. His brother Emilio played college soccer at the University of Mount Union. Spetic also has multiple uncles who played college soccer. During his time at Ohio University, he started practicing meditation before games.

Spetic takes great pride in his Croatian heritage. During his time at Memphis, he befriended Filip Sabatti, the Croatian goalkeeper on the Tigers men's soccer team.
