= Chase Hendricks =

American football player (born 2005)

- Hendricks in 2026

No. 7 – California Golden Bears
- Position: Wide receiver
- Class: Senior

Personal information
- Born: January 26, 2005 (age 21)
- Listed height: 6 ft 0 in (1.83 m)
- Listed weight: 200 lb (91 kg)

Career information
- High school: St. Mary's (St. Louis, Missouri)
- College: Ohio (2023–2025); California (2026–present)

Awards and highlights
- Second-team All-MAC (2025)
- Stats at ESPN

Chase Hendricks (born January 26, 2005) is an American college football wide receiver for the California Golden Bears. He previously played for the Ohio Bobcats.

== Early life ==
Hendricks attended St. Mary's High School in St. Louis, Missouri. As a senior, he had 39 receptions for 936 yards with 22 touchdowns and 1,300 all-purpose yards. He committed to the University of Ohio to play college football.

== College career ==
As a true freshman at Ohio in 2023, Hendricks started two of 13 games and had 11 receptions for 108 yards. He started 13 of 14 games his sophomore year in 2024, recording 40 receptions for 471 yards and a touchdown. He became Ohio's number one receiver in 2025, finishing with 71 receptions for 1,037 yards and seven touchdowns. After the season, Hendricks entered the transfer portal and committed to the University of California, Berkeley.
