= Kurtis Rourke =

Canadian-American football player (born 2000)

No. 14 – San Francisco 49ers
- Position: Quarterback
- Roster status: Active

Personal information
- Born: October 25, 2000 (age 26); Kitchener, Ontario, Canada
- Listed height: 6 ft 4 in (1.93 m)
- Listed weight: 220 lb (100 kg)

Career information
- High school: Holy Trinity (Oakville, Ontario)
- College: Ohio (2019–2023); Indiana (2024)
- NFL draft: 2025: 7th round, 227th overall pick
- CFL draft: 2025: 3rd round, 25th overall pick

Career history
- San Francisco 49ers (2025–present)

Awards and highlights
- Jon Cornish Trophy (2024); MAC Most Valuable Player (2022); MAC Offensive Player of the Year (2022); First-team All-MAC (2022); Second-team All-Big Ten (2024); Second-team All-MAC (2023)
- Stats at Pro Football Reference

Kurtis Rourke (born October 25, 2000) is a Canadian professional football quarterback for the San Francisco 49ers of the National Football League (NFL). He played college football for the Ohio Bobcats and Indiana Hoosiers. Rourke was selected by the 49ers in the seventh round of the 2025 NFL draft.

== College career ==
=== Ohio ===
Rourke was the starting quarterback for the Ohio Bobcats football team. After redshirting in 2019, he shared time at quarterback with Armani Rogers in 2020 and 2021. He was named MAC student athlete of the week on October 27, 2021, and September 27, 2023. As the starting quarterback for the Bobcats in 2022, he was MAC East offensive player of the week three times during the 2022 season. The first time came in week one of the season after passing for 308 yards and four touchdowns against Florida Atlantic. He won the award again in week 4 after passing for a school record 537 yards against Fordham, and also in week 10 with 317 yards and five touchdown passes against Buffalo. After throwing for 3,256 yards and 25 touchdowns, Rourke suffered a season-ending torn ACL in the eleventh game of the season against Ball State. In spite of missing the last game and a half of the regular season, he won the 2022 Vern Smith Leadership Award for MAC Player of the Year.

Prior to the 2023 season, he was included on the watch lists for the Maxwell Award, Davey O'Brien Award, Walter Camp Award, Manning Award, and Johnny Unitas Golden Arm Award. and finished the regular season as second team all-MAC. He entered the transfer portal on December 5, 2023.

=== Indiana ===
On December 14, 2023, Rourke announced that he would be transferring to Indiana. On November 30, 2024, Rourke tied a school record with 6 passing touchdowns in a 66–0 victory over Purdue. In 12 games for the Hoosiers, Rourke logged 3,042 passing yards, 29 touchdowns, and five interceptions. On January 3, 2025, it was announced that Rourke had played the entire season on a torn ACL in his right knee, and would undergo surgery to repair the injury.

=== College statistics ===
Season	Team	Games			Passing								Rushing			
Season	Team	GP	GS	Record (Note: Accounts for only games started as a quarterback: On 11/16/21 and 11/26/21, Armani Rogers took the first snap at quarterback while Kurtis Rourke started at wide receiver, Rogers was credited with the decision, even if removed after the first play.)	Cmp	Att	Pct	Yds	Y/A	TD	Int	Rtg	Att	Yds	Avg	TD
2019	Ohio	1	0	—	Redshirted (redshirt)								3	20	6.7	0
2020	Ohio	3	3	2–1	30	44	68.2	386	8.8	3	0	164.4	14	17	1.2	0
2021	Ohio	10	9	3–4	169	259	65.3	1,801	7.0	11	7	132.3	74	327	4.4	3
2022	Ohio	11	11	8–3	244	353	69.1	3,257	9.2	25	4	167.7	74	245	3.3	4
2023	Ohio	11	11	8–3	195	307	63.5	2,207	7.2	11	5	132.5	67	219	3.3	4
2024	Indiana	12	12	10–2	222	320	69.4	3,042	9.5	29	5	176.0	46	–35	–0.8	2
Career		48	46	31–13	860	1,283	67.0	10,693	8.3	79	21	154.1	278	793	2.9	13

== Professional career ==
Rourke declared for the NFL draft, although he was also eligible for the CFL draft due to being a Canadian player in the NCAA, and was projected to be a top draft pick there if he were to go undrafted in the NFL draft; he was ranked #2 overall in the CFL's final pre-draft rankings.

Pre-draft measurables
Height	Weight	Arm length	Hand span	Wingspan
6 ft 4 1/4 in (1.94 m)	220 lb (100 kg)	30 1/4 in (0.77 m)	9 3/8 in (0.24 m)	6 ft 3 1/8 in (1.91 m)
All values from NFL Combine

Rourke was selected in the seventh round (227th overall) by the San Francisco 49ers in the 2025 NFL draft and in the third round (25th overall) by the Saskatchewan Roughriders in the 2025 CFL draft.

== Personal life ==
Rourke was born to Larry and Robyn Rourke. Rourke's older brother Nathan Rourke, who preceded Kurtis as Ohio's starting quarterback, is a professional quarterback who plays for the BC Lions of the Canadian Football League (CFL).

Rourke is married to Caroline Rourke.

Rourke is a Christian. He has said, “My identity is in Jesus and not my sport. I may have a bad practice, may have a bad throw, but knowing that, no matter what, Jesus is proud of me. He's proud that I'm there and my goal every day [is] to work to glorify Him.”
