= 2023 Mid-American Conference football season =

- League: NCAA Division I Football Bowl Subdivision
- Sport: Football
- Duration: August 26 - December 2
- Teams: 12

2024 NFL Draft
- Top draft pick: Quinyon Mitchell, CB, Toledo
- Picked by: Philadelphia Eagles, 22nd overall

Regular season

MAC Championship Game

Seasons
- 2022 2024

2023 Mid-American Conference football standings
	Conf.			Overall
Team	W		L	W		L
East Division
Miami (OH) xy$	7	–	1	11	–	3
Ohio	6	–	2	10	–	3
Bowling Green	5	–	3	7	–	6
Buffalo	3	–	5	3	–	9
Akron	1	–	7	2	–	10
Kent State	0	–	8	1	–	11
West Division
Toledo xy	8	–	0	11	–	3
Northern Illinois	5	–	3	7	–	6
Eastern Michigan	4	–	4	6	–	7
Central Michigan	3	–	5	5	–	7
Ball State	3	–	5	4	–	8
Western Michigan	3	–	5	4	–	8
Championship: Miami (OH) 23, Toledo 14
$ – Conference champion; x – Division champion/co-champions; y – Championship game participant

The 2023 Mid-American Conference football season was the 78th season for the Mid-American Conference (MAC), as part of the 2023 NCAA Division I FBS football season. Non-conference play began with one game on August 26. Conference play began on September 23 and concluded with the MAC championship game on Saturday, December 2 at Ford Field in Detroit, Michigan. Miami won the East division with a 7-1 conference record with their only loss coming against Toledo. Toledo won the West with a perfect conference record. Their quarterback Dequan Finn won Player of the Year and coach Jason Candle won coach of the year. On October 21, during the regular season game between the division winners, Miami quarterback Brett Gabbert suffered a season ending leg injury. In spite of that, Miami won their first MAC Championship since 2019 with a 23–14 upset victory in the MAC Championship Game.

== Preseason ==
The MAC Football Kickoff was held on July 20, 2023 at Fox Theatre in Detroit, Michigan from 9:00 am EDT to 1:30 pm EDT. Each team had their head coach and a student athlete from both the offense and the defense to speak to the media.

- Akron – Head Coach Joe Moorhead, Daniel George, R-Sr., WR, KJ Martin, R-So., DB
- Ball State – Head Coach Mike Neu, Brady Hunt, R-So., TE, Clayton Coll, Sr., LB
- Bowling Green – Head Coach Scot Loeffler, Darren Anders, Sr., ILB, Odieu Hiliare, Sr., WR
- Buffalo – Head Coach Maurice Linguist, Marcus Fuqua, 5th-Yr., S, Cole Snyder, 5th-Yr., QB
- Central Michigan – Head Coach Jim McElwain, Deiyantei Powell Woods, Sr., OL, Trey Jones, Jr., DB
- Eastern Michigan – Head Coach Chris Creighton, Samson Evans, Grad., RB, Chase Kline, Senior, LB
- Kent State – Head Coach Kenni Burns, CJ West, Sr., DL, Khalib Johns, Gr., LB
- Miami – Head Coach Chuck Martin, Brett Gabbert, R-Jr., QB, Matthew Salopek, R-Jr., LB
- Northern Illinois – Head Coach Thomas Hammock, Nolan Potter, R-Sr., OL, James Ester, Sr., DT
- Ohio – Head Coach Tim Albin, Kurtis Rourke, R-Sr., QB, Bryce Houston, Grad., LB
- Toledo – Head Coach Jason Candle, Quinyon Mitchell, Jr., CB, Dequan Finn, Jr., QB
- Western Michigan – Head Coach Lance Taylor, Jacob Gideon, Jr., OL, Marshawn Kneeland, R-Jr., DL

=== Preseason polls ===
==== Coaches Poll ====
On July 20 the MAC announced the preseason coaches poll. Defending MAC champion Toledo was named the preseason favorite to win the conference while Ohio was picked to win the Eastern Division.

East
Predicted finish	Team	Votes (1st place)
1	Ohio	63 (9)
2	Miami	52 (2)
3	Buffalo	51 (1)
4	Bowling Green	35
5	Akron	26
6	Kent State	19

West
Predicted finish	Team	Votes (1st place)
1	Toledo	66 (11)
2	Eastern Michigan	55 (1)
3	Northern Illinois	38
4	Central Michigan	37
5	Ball State	27
6	Western Michigan	23

Coaches poll (MAC Championship)
Rank	Team	Votes
1	Toledo	7
2	Ohio	4
3	Buffalo	1

=== Individual Award Preseason Watchlists ===
Award	Head Coach/Player	School	Position	Ref
Lott Trophy	Marcus Fuqua	Buffalo	S	
Dodd Trophy	none		HC	
Maxwell Award	Alex Adams	Akron	WR	
Maxwell Award	Marquez Cooper	Ball State	RB	
Maxwell Award	Samson Evans	Eastern Michigan	RB	
Maxwell Award	Kurtis Rourke	Ohio	QB	
Maxwell Award	Dequan Finn	Toledo	QB	
Davey O'Brien Award	Kurtis Rourke	Ohio	QB	
Davey O'Brien Award	Dequan Finn	Toledo	QB	
Doak Walker Award	Sieh Bangura	Ohio	RB	
Doak Walker Award	Samson Evans	Eastern Michigan	RB	
Doak Walker Award	Antario Brown	Northern Illinois	RB	
Biletnikoff Award	Alex Adams	Akron	WR	
Biletnikoff Award	Sam Wiglusz	Ohio	WR	
Biletnikoff Award	Jerjuan Newton	Toledo	WR	
John Mackey Award	Brady Hunt	Ball State	TE	
Rimington Trophy	Jacob Gideon	Western Michigan	C	
Butkus Award	Shaun Dolac	Buffalo	LB	
Butkus Award	Dallas Gant	Toledo	LB	
Jim Thorpe Award	Quinyon Mitchell	Toledo	CB	
Jim Thorpe Award	Marcus Fuqua	Buffalo	S	
Bronko Nagurski Trophy	Shaun Dolac	Buffalo	LB	
Bronko Nagurski Trophy	Marcus Fuqua	Buffalo	S	
Bronko Nagurski Trophy	Maxen Hook	Toledo	S	
Bronko Nagurski Trophy	Donte Kent	Central Michigan	CB	
Bronko Nagurski Trophy	Quinyon Mitchell	Toledo	CB	
Bronko Nagurski Trophy	Devonte O'Malley	Northerm Illinois	DT	

Award	Head Coach/Player	School	Position	Ref
Outland Trophy	Ethan Crowe	Ball State	C	
Outland Trophy	Daymond Williams	Buffalo	DT	
Outland Trophy	Deiyantei Powell-Woods	Central Michigan	G	
Outland Trophy	Nolan Potter	Northern Illinois	T	
Outland Trophy	Nick Rosi	Toledo	T	
Lou Groza Award	Alex McNulty	Buffalo	K	
Lou Groza Award	Jesús Gómez	Eastern Michigan	K	
Ray Guy Award	Lucas Borrow	Ball State	P	
Ray Guy Award	Mitchell Tomasek	Eastern Michigan	P	
Ray Guy Award	Dom Dzioban	Miami	P	
Paul Hornung Award	Ron Cook Jr.	Buffalo	RB	
Paul Hornung Award	Trayvon Rudolph	Northern Illinois	WR	
Paul Hornung Award	Jacquez Stuart	Toledo	RB	
Wuerffel Trophy	Clayton Coll	Ball State	LB	
Wuerffel Trophy	Abdul-Fatai Ibrahim	Bowling Green	WR	
Wuerffel Trophy	Austin Osborne	Bowling Green	WR	
Wuerffel Trophy	Brock Horne	Bowling Green	LB	
Wuerffel Trophy	Darren Anders	Bowling Green	LB	
Wuerffel Trophy	Demetrius Hardamon	Bowling Green	LB	
Wuerffel Trophy	Max Michel	Buffalo	DE	
Wuerffel Trophy	Robi Stuart	Central Michigan	DL	
Wuerffel Trophy	Brian Dooley	Eastern Michigan	OL	
Wuerffel Trophy	Dallas Gant	Toledo	LB	
Wuerffel Trophy	Boone Bonnema	Western Michigan	LB	

Award	Head Coach/Player	School	Position	Ref
Walter Camp Award	Kurtis Rourke	Ohio	QB	
Walter Camp Award	Samson Evans	Eastern Michigan	RB	
Bednarik Award	Shaun Dolac	Buffalo	LB	
Bednarik Award	Quinyon Mitchell	Toledo	CB	
Rotary Lombardi Award	Dallas Gant	LB	Toledo	
Patrick Mannelly Award	none		LS	
Earl Campbell Tyler Rose Award	Bert Emmanuel Jr.	QB	Central Michigan	
Earl Campbell Tyler Rose Award	Jaylon Jackson	RB	Eastern Michigan	
Manning Award	Dequan Finn	Toledo	QB	
Manning Award	Kurtis Rourke	Ohio	QB	
Manning Award	Cole Snyder	Buffalo	QB	
Johnny Unitas Golden Arm Award	Kurtis Rourke	Ohio	QB	

== Coaches ==
=== Coaching changes ===
The MAC enters the 2023 season with two new head football coaches:

- Western Michigan fired Tim Lester on November 28, 2022, after his team finished the 2022 season with a 5–7. On December 7, 2022 Lance Taylor, who was the offensive coordinator for Louisville in 2022, was introduced as the new head coach.
- On December 4, 2022 Sean Lewis stepped down as Kent State head coach to become the offensive coordinator at Colorado under new head coach Deion Sanders. On December 13, 2022, Kent State hired former Minnesota associate head coach Kenni Burns as their new head coach.

=== Head coaching records ===
Team	Head coach	Previous Job	Years at school	Overall record	MAC record	MAC titles
Akron	Joe Moorhead	Oregon (offensive coordinator)	2	54–35 (.607)	1–7 (.125)	0
Ball State	Mike Neu	New Orleans Saints (QB Coach)	8	33–48 (.407)	20–34 (.370)	1
Bowling Green	Scot Loeffler	Boston College (offensive coordinator/QB coach)	5	13–29 (.310)	9–20 (.310)	0
Buffalo	Maurice Linguist	Michigan (co-defensive coordinator)	3	11–14 (.440)	7–9 (.438)	0
Central Michigan	Jim McElwain	Florida	5	68–48 (.586)	18–12 (.600)	0
Eastern Michigan	Chris Creighton	Drake	10	185–107 (.634)	27–43 (.386)	0
Kent State	Kenni Burns	Minnesota (associate head coach)	1	0–0 (–)	0–0 (–)	0
Miami	Chuck Martin	Notre Dame (offensive coordinator/QB coach)	9	119–66 (.643)	37–30 (.552)	1
Northern Illinois	Thomas Hammock	Baltimore Ravens (running backs coach)	5	17–27 (.386)	12–18 (.400)	1
Ohio	Tim Albin	Ohio (associate head coach)	3	38–21 (.644)	10–6 (.625)	0
Toledo	Jason Candle	Toledo (offensive coordinator)	8	54–32 (.628)	35–19 (.648)	2
Western Michigan	Lance Taylor	Louisville (offensive coordinator)	1	0–0 (–)	0–0 (–)	0

Source -

== Rankings ==
		Pre	Wk 1	Wk 2	Wk 3	Wk 4	Wk 5	Wk 6	Wk 7	Wk 8	Wk 9	Wk 10	Wk 11	Wk 12	Wk 13	Wk 14	Final
Akron	AP																
Akron	C																
Akron	CFP	Not released															
Ball State	AP																
Ball State	C																
Ball State	CFP	Not released															
Bowling Green	AP																
Bowling Green	C																
Bowling Green	CFP	Not released															
Buffalo	AP																
Buffalo	C																
Buffalo	CFP	Not released															
Central Michigan	AP																
Central Michigan	C																
Central Michigan	CFP	Not released															
Eastern Michigan	AP																
Eastern Michigan	C																
Eastern Michigan	CFP	Not released															
Kent State	AP																
Kent State	C																
Kent State	CFP	Not released															
Miami	AP												RV	RV	RV	RV	RV
Miami	C															RV	
Miami	CFP	Not released															
Northern Illinois	AP																
Northern Illinois	C																
Northern Illinois	CFP	Not released															
Ohio	AP																RV
Ohio	C				RV		RV	RV									
Ohio	CFP	Not released															
Toledo	AP	RV								RV	RV	RV	RV	23	23	RV	RV
Toledo	C	RV								RV	RV	RV	RV	RV	RV	RV	
Toledo	CFP	Not released															
Western Michigan	AP																
Western Michigan	C																
Western Michigan	CFP	Not released															

Legend
	Improvement in ranking
	Drop in ranking
	Not ranked previous week
	No change in ranking from previous week
RV	Received votes but were not ranked in Top 25 of poll
т	Tied with team above or below also with this symbol

Source: AP -

Coaches -

CFP -

== Schedule ==
Index to colors and formatting
MAC member won
MAC member lost
MAC teams in **bold**

All times Eastern time.

=== Week 0 ===
Date	Time	Visiting team	Home team	Site	TV	Result	Attendance	Ref.
August 26	7:00 p.m.	**Ohio**	San Diego State	Snapdragon Stadium • San Diego, CA	FS1	**L** 13–20	23,867	
^{#}Rankings from AP Poll released prior to game. All times are in Eastern Time.

=== Week 1 ===
Date	Time	Visiting team	Home team	Site	TV	Result	Attendance	Ref.
August 31	7:00 p.m.	Saint Francis (PA)	**Western Michigan**	Waldo Stadium • Kalamazoo, MI	ESPN+	**W** 35–17	19,432	
August 31	7:00 p.m.	**Kent State**	UCF	FBC Mortgage Stadium • Orlando, FL	FS1	**L** 6–56	44,088	
September 1	6:30 p.m.	Howard	**Eastern Michigan**	Rynearson Stadium • Ypsilanti, MI	ESPN+	**W** 33–23	18,065	
September 1	7:00 p.m.	**Miami (OH)**	Miami (FL)	Hard Rock Stadium • Miami, FL	ACCN	**L** 3–38	49,024	
September 1	7:00 p.m.	**Central Michigan**	Michigan State	Spartan Stadium • East Lansing, MI	FS1	**L** 7–31		
September 2	12:00 p.m.	LIU	**Ohio**	Peden Stadium • Athens, OH	ESPN+	**W** 27–10	18,453	
September 2	12:00 p.m.	**Ball State**	Kentucky	Kroger Field • Lexington, KY	SECN	**L** 14–44		
September 2	12:00 p.m.	**Bowling Green**	Liberty	Williams Stadium • Lynchburg, VA	CBSSN	**L** 24–34	18,811	
September 2	12:00 p.m.	**Northern Illinois**	Boston College	Alumni Stadium • Chestnut Hill, MA	ACCN	**W** 27–24 ^{OT}	30,122	
September 2	2:00 p.m.	**Akron**	Temple	Lincoln Financial Field • Philadelphia, PA	ESPN+	**L** 21–24	12,456	
September 2	3:30 p.m.	**Buffalo**	No. 19 Wisconsin	Camp Randall Stadium • Madison, WI	FS1	**L** 17–38	76,224	
September 2	7:30 p.m.	**Toledo**	Illinois	Memorial Stadium • Champaign, IL	BTN	**L** 28–30	48,898	
^{#}Rankings from AP Poll released prior to game. All times are in Eastern Time.

=== Week 2 ===
Date	Time	Visiting team	Home team	Site	TV	Result	Attendance	Ref.
September 9	12:00 p.m.	**Ball State**	No. 1 Georgia	Sanford Stadium • Athens, GA	SECN	**L** 3–45	92,746	
September 9	1:30 p.m.	No. 11 (FCS) New Hampshire	**Central Michigan**	Kelly/Shorts Stadium • Mount Pleasant, MI	ESPN+	**W** 45–42	17,302	
September 9	2:00 p.m.	Eastern Illinois	**Bowling Green**	Doyt Perry Stadium • Bowling Green, OH	ESPN+	**W** 38–15	12,312	
September 9	3:30 p.m.	No. 24 (FCS) Southern Illinois	**Northern Illinois**	Huskie Stadium • DeKalb, IL	ESPN+	**L** 11–14	13,114	
September 9	3:30 p.m.	Texas Southern	**Toledo**	Glass Bowl • Toledo, OH	ESPN+	**W** 71–3	22,742	
September 9	3:30 p.m.	**Miami (OH)**	UMass	Warren McGuirk Alumni Stadium • Hadley, MA	ESPN+	**W** 41–28	9,207	
September 9	3:30 p.m.	**Western Michigan**	Syracuse	JMA Wireless Dome • Syracuse, NY	ESPN+	**L** 7–48	32,637	
September 9	4:00 p.m.	**Kent State**	Arkansas	D.W.R. Razorback Stadium • Fayetteville, AR	SECN	**L** 6–28	73,173	
September 9	6:00 p.m.	Morgan State	**Akron**	InfoCision Stadium–Summa Field • Akron, OH	ESPN+	**W** 24–21	8,213	
September 9	6:00 p.m.	Fordham	**Buffalo**	UB Stadium • Buffalo, NY	ESPN+	**L** 37–40	15,854	
September 9	6:00 p.m.	**Ohio**	Florida Atlantic	FAU Stadium • Boca Raton, FL	ESPN+	**W** 17–10	17,934	
September 9	7:30 p.m.	**Eastern Michigan**	Minnesota	Huntington Bank Stadium • Minneapolis, MN	BTN	**L** 6–25	48,101	
^{#}Rankings from AP Poll released prior to game. All times are in Eastern Time.

=== Week 3 ===
Date	Time	Visiting team	Home team	Site	TV	Result	Attendance	Ref.
September 16	12:00 p.m.	Iowa State	**Ohio**	Peden Stadium • Athens, OH	ESPN2/ESPNU	**W** 10–7	21,991	
September 16	12:00 p.m.	Liberty	**Buffalo**	UB Stadium • Buffalo, NY	CBSSN	**L** 27–55	13,020	
September 16	12:00 p.m.	Central Connecticut	**Kent State**	Dix Stadium • Kent, OH	ESPN+	**W** 38–10	10,731	
September 16	2:00 p.m.	Indiana State	**Ball State**	Scheumann Stadium • Muncie, IN (Blue Key Victory Bell)	ESPN+	**W** 45–7	15,054	
September 16	2:00 p.m.	UMass	**Eastern Michigan**	Rynearson Stadium • Ypsilanti, MI	ESPN+	**W** 19–17	16,138	
September 16	2:30 p.m.	**Central Michigan**	No. 9 Notre Dame	Notre Dame Stadium • South Bend, IN	Peacock	**L** 17–41	77,622	
September 16	3:30 p.m.	**Western Michigan**	No. 25 Iowa	Kinnick Stadium • Iowa City, IA	BTN	**L** 10–41	69,250	
September 16	7:00 p.m.	**Northern Illinois**	Nebraska	Memorial Stadium • Lincoln, NE	FS1	**L** 11–35	86,875	
September 16	7:00 p.m.	**Miami (OH)**	Cincinnati	Nippert Stadium • Cincinnati, OH (Victory Bell)	ESPN+	**W** 31–24 ^{OT}	38,193	
September 16	7:00 p.m.	San Jose State	**Toledo**	Glass Bowl • Toledo, OH	ESPN+	**W** 21–17	20,039	
September 16	7:00 p.m.	**Akron**	Kentucky	Kroger Field • Lexington, KY	ESPNU	**L** 3–35	59,456	
September 16	7:30 p.m.	**Bowling Green**	No. 2 Michigan	Michigan Stadium • Ann Arbor, MI	BTN	**L** 6–31	109,955	
^{#}Rankings from AP Poll released prior to game. All times are in Eastern Time.

=== Week 4 ===
Date	Time	Visiting team	Home team	Site	TV	Result	Attendance	Ref.
September 23	12:00 p.m.	Tulsa	**Northern Illinois**	Huskie Stadium • DeKalb, IL	CBSSN	**L** 14–22	10,321	
September 23	1:30 p.m.	**Western Michigan**	**Toledo**	Glass Bowl • Toledo, OH	ESPN+	**TOL** 49–31	19,068	
September 23	2:00 p.m.	Georgia Southern	**Ball State**	Scheumann Stadium • Muncie, IN	ESPN+	**L** 3–40	10,118	
September 23	3:30 p.m.	**Ohio**	**Bowling Green**	Doyt Perry Stadium • Bowling Green, OH	ESPN+	**OHIO** 38–7	18,248	
September 23	3:30 p.m.	Delaware State	**Miami (OH)**	Yager Stadium • Oxford, OH	ESPN+	**W** 62–20	15,812	
September 23	5:00 p.m.	**Eastern Michigan**	Jacksonville State	Burgess–Snow Field at JSU Stadium • Jacksonville, AL	ESPN+	**L** 0–21	20,966	
September 23	5:00 p.m.	**Central Michigan**	South Alabama	Hancock Whitney Stadium • Mobile, AL	ESPN+	**W** 34–30	18,369	
September 23	7:30 p.m.	**Akron**	Indiana	Memorial Stadium • Bloomington, IN	BTN	**L** 27–29 ^{4OT}	44,968	
September 23	7:30 p.m.	**Buffalo**	Louisiana	Cajun Field • Lafayette, LA	ESPN+	**L** 38–45	17,674	
September 23	10:30 p.m.	**Kent State**	Fresno State	Valley Children's Stadium • Fresno, CA	CBSSN	**L** 10–53	38,728	
^{#}Rankings from AP Poll released prior to game. All times are in Eastern Time.

=== Week 5 ===
Date	Time	Visiting team	Home team	Site	TV	Result	Attendance	Ref.
September 30	12:00 p.m.	Buffalo	**Akron**	InfoCision Stadium–Summa Field • Akron, OH	ESPN+	**UB** 13–10 ^{OT}	5,490	
September 30	1:30 p.m.	Eastern Michigan	**Central Michigan**	Kelly/Shorts Stadium • Mount Pleasant, MI (Michigan MAC Trophy)	ESPN+	**CMU** 26–23	28,323	
September 30	2:30 p.m.	Miami (OH)	**Kent State**	Dix Stadium • Kent, OH	ESPN+	**M-OH** 23–3	13,598	
September 30	3:30 p.m.	Bowling Green	Georgia Tech	Bobby Dodd Stadium • Atlanta, GA	ACCN	**W** 38–27	30,097	
September 30	3:30 p.m.	Ball State	**Western Michigan**	Waldo Stadium • Kalamazoo, MI	ESPN+	**WMU** 42–24	21,880	
September 30	3:30 p.m.	Northern Illinois	**Toledo**	Glass Bowl • Toledo, OH	ESPNU	**TOL** 35–33	23,417	
^{#}Rankings from AP Poll released prior to game. All times are in Eastern Time.

=== Week 6 ===
Date	Time	Visiting team	Home team	Site	TV	Result	Attendance	Ref.
October 7	12:00 p.m.	Western Michigan	Mississippi State	Davis Wade Stadium • Starkville, MS	SECN	**L** 28–41	47,158	
October 7	12:00 p.m.	Toledo	UMass	Warren McGuirk Alumni Stadium • Hadley, MA	ESPNU	**W** 41–24	9,623	
October 7	2:00 p.m.	Central Michigan	**Buffalo**	UB Stadium • Buffalo, NY	ESPN+	**UB** 37–13	12,093	
October 7	3:30 p.m.	Ball State	**Eastern Michigan**	Rynearson Stadium • Ypsilanti, MI	ESPN+	**EMU** 24–10	18,696	
October 7	3:30 p.m.	Northern Illinois	**Akron**	InfoCision Stadium–Summa Field • Akron, OH	ESPN+	**NIU** 55–14	8,216	
October 7	3:30 p.m.	Kent State	**Ohio**	Peden Stadium • Athens, OH	ESPN+	**OHIO** 42–17	22,945	
October 7	3:30 p.m	Bowling Green	**Miami (OH)**	Yager Stadium • Oxford, OH	ESPN+	**M-OH** 27–0	19,047	
^{#}Rankings from AP Poll released prior to game. All times are in Eastern Time.

=== Week 7 ===
Date	Time	Visiting team	Home team	Site	TV	Result	Attendance	Ref.
October 14	12:00 p.m.	Kent State	Eastern Michigan	Rynearson Stadium • Ypsilanti, MI	CBSSN	**EMU** 28–14	18,443	
October 14	2:00 p.m.	Toledo	Ball State	Scheumann Stadium • Muncie, IN	ESPN+	**TOL** 13–6	7,673	
October 14	3:30 p.m.	Akron	Central Michigan	Kelly/Shorts Stadium • Mount Pleasant, MI	ESPN+	**CMU** 17–10	17,886	
October 14	3:30 p.m.	Bowling Green	Buffalo	UB Stadium • Buffalo, NY	ESPN+	**BGSU** 24–14	15,196	
October 14	3:30 p.m.	Miami (OH)	Western Michigan	Waldo Stadium • Kalamazoo, MI	ESPN+	**M-OH** 34–21	20,039	
October 14	4:00 p.m.	Ohio	Northern Illinois	Huskie Stadium • DeKalb, IL	ESPNU	**NIU** 23–13	11,143	
^{#}Rankings from AP Poll released prior to game. All times are in Eastern Time.

=== Week 8 ===
Date	Time	Visiting team	Home team	Site	TV	Result	Attendance	Ref.
October 21	12:00 p.m.	Western Michigan	Ohio	Peden Stadium • Athens, OH	CBSSN	**OHIO** 20–17	16,048	
October 21	2:00 p.m.	Akron	Bowling Green	Doyt Perry Stadium • Bowling Green, OH	ESPN+	**BGSU** 41–14	10,068	
October 21	3:30 p.m.	Central Michigan	Ball State	Scheumann Stadium • Muncie, IN	ESPN+	**BSU** 24–17	15,171	
October 21	3:30 p.m.	Buffalo	Kent State	Dix Stadium • Kent, OH	ESPN+	**UB** 24–6	11,735	
October 21	3:30 p.m.	Eastern Michigan	Northern Illinois	Huskie Stadium • DeKalb, IL	ESPN+	**NIU** 20–13	9,458	
October 21	4:00 p.m.	Toledo	Miami (OH)	Yager Stadium • Oxford, OH	ESPNU	**TOL** 21–17	17,321	
^{#}Rankings from AP Poll released prior to game. All times are in Eastern Time.

=== Week 9 ===
Date	Time	Visiting team	Home team	Site	TV	Result	Attendance	Ref.
October 28	1:00 p.m.	**Western Michigan**	**Eastern Michigan**	Rynearson Stadium • Ypsilanti, MI (Michigan MAC Trophy)	ESPN+	**WMU** 45–21	16,297	
October 28	3:30 p.m.	**Miami (OH)**	**Ohio**	Peden Stadium • Athens, OH (Battle of the Bricks)	CBSSN	**M-OH** 30–16	19,854	
^{#}Rankings from AP Poll released prior to game. All times are in Eastern Time.

=== Week 10 ===
Date	Time	Visiting team	Home team	Site	TV	Result	Attendance	Ref.
October 31	7:00 p.m.	**Northern Illinois**	**Central Michigan**	Kelly/Shorts Stadium • Mount Pleasant, MI	ESPNU	**CMU** 37–31	9,625	
October 31	7:30 p.m.	**Buffalo**	**Toledo**	Glass Bowl • Toledo, OH	ESPN2	**TOL** 31–13	14,939	
November 1	7:00 p.m.	**Ball State**	**Bowling Green**	Doyt Perry Stadium • Bowling Green, OH	ESPN2	**BGSU** 24–21	6,091	
November 1	7:30 p.m.	**Kent State**	**Akron**	InfoCision Stadium–Summa Field • Akron, OH (Wagon Wheel)	ESPNU	**AKR** 31–27	8,113	
^{#}Rankings from College Football Playoff. All times are in Eastern Time.

=== Week 11 ===
Date	Time	Visiting team	Home team	Site	TV	Result	Attendance	Ref.
November 7	7:00 p.m.	Ball State	Northern Illinois	Huskie Stadium • DeKalb, IL (Bronze Stalk Trophy)	CBSSN	**BSU** 20–17	6,282	
November 7	7:00 p.m.	Central Michigan	Western Michigan	Waldo Stadium • Kalamazoo, MI (Michigan MAC Trophy)	ESPNU	**WMU** 38–28		
November 7	7:30 p.m.	Ohio	Buffalo	UB Stadium • Buffalo, NY	ESPN2	**OHIO** 20–10	11,444	
November 8	7:00 p.m.	Akron	Miami (OH)	Yager Stadium • Oxford, OH	ESPNU	**M-OH** 19–0	7,233	
November 8	7:00 p.m.	Bowling Green	Kent State	Dix Stadium • Kent, OH (Anniversary Award)	CBSSN	**BGSU** 49–19	6,065	
November 8	7:30 p.m.	Eastern Michigan	Toledo	Glass Bowl • Toledo, OH	ESPN2	**TOL** 49–23	17,842	
^{#}Rankings from College Football Playoff. All times are in Eastern Time.

=== Week 12 ===
Date	Time	Visiting team	Home team	Site	TV	Result	Attendance	Ref.
November 14	7:00 p.m.	Toledo	Bowling Green	Doyt Perry Stadium • Bowling Green, OH (Battle of I-75)	ESPN2	**TOL** 32–31	20.590	
November 14	7:00 p.m.	Western Michigan	Northern Illinois	Huskie Stadium • DeKalb, IL	ESPNU	**NIU** 24–0	6,417	
November 14	7:00 p.m.	Akron	Eastern Michigan	Rynearson Stadium • Ypsilanti, MI	CBSSN	**EMU** 30–27 ^{2OT}	13,664	
November 15	7:00 p.m.	Central Michigan	Ohio	Peden Stadium • Athens, OH	ESPNU	**OHIO** 34–20	14,736	
November 15	7:00 p.m.	Buffalo	Miami (OH)	Yager Stadium • Oxford, OH	ESPN2	**M-OH** 23–10	7,561	
November 18	2:00 p.m.	Kent State	Ball State	Scheumann Stadium • Muncie, IN	ESPN+	**BSU** 34–3	8,554	
^{#}Rankings from College Football Playoff. All times are in Eastern Time.

=== Week 13 ===
Date	Time	Visiting team	Home team	Site	TV	Result	Attendance	Ref.
November 21	7:00 p.m.	Bowling Green	Western Michigan	Waldo Stadium • Kalamazoo, MI	ESPNU	**BGSU** 34–10	8,901	
November 21	7:30 p.m.	Eastern Michigan	Buffalo	UB Stadium • Buffalo, NY	ESPN2	**EMU** 24–11	11,243	
November 24	12:00 p.m.	Toledo	Central Michigan	Kelly/Shorts Stadium • Mount Pleasant, MI	ESPNU	**TOL** 32–17	8,612	
November 24	12:00 p.m.	Ohio	Akron	InfoCision Stadium–Summa Field • Akron, OH	CBSSN	**OHIO** 25–14	6,152	
November 25	12:00 p.m.	Northern Illinois	Kent State	Dix Stadium • Kent, OH	ESPN+	**NIU** 37–27		
November 25	12:00 p.m.	Miami (OH)	Ball State	Scheumann Stadium • Muncie, IN (Red Bird Rivalry)	CBSSN	**M-OH** 17–15	8,054	
^{#}Rankings from College Football Playoff. All times are in Eastern Time.

=== MAC Conference Championship Game ===
Date	Time	Visiting team	Home team	Site	TV	Result	Attendance	Ref.
December 2	12:00 p.m.	**Toledo**	**Miami (OH)**	Ford Field • Detroit, MI	ESPN	**M-OH** 23–14	-	
^{#}Rankings from College Football Playoff. All times are in Eastern Time.

== Postseason ==
=== Bowl Games ===
Legend
MAC win
MAC loss

Bowl game	Date	Site	Television	Time (EST)	MAC team	Opponent	Score	Attendance
Myrtle Beach Bowl	December 16	Brooks Stadium • Conway, SC	ESPN	11:00 a.m.	Ohio	Georgia Southern	W 41–21	8,059
Cure Bowl	December 16	FBC Mortgage Stadium • Orlando, FL	ABC	3:30 p.m.	Miami (OH)	Appalachian State	L 9–13	11,121
Camellia Bowl	December 23	Cramton Bowl • Montgomery, AL	ESPN	12:00 p.m.	Northern Illinois	Arkansas State	W 21–19	11,310
68 Ventures Bowl	December 23	Hancock Whitney Stadium • Mobile, AL	ESPN	7:00 p.m.	Eastern Michigan	South Alabama	L 10–59	
Quick Lane Bowl	December 26	Ford Field • Detroit, MI	ESPN	2:00 p.m.	Bowling Green	Minnesota	L 24–30	
Arizona Bowl	December 30	Arizona Stadium • Tucson, AZ	Barstool / The CW	4:00 p.m.	Toledo	Wyoming	L 15–16	

== MAC records vs. other conferences ==
2023–2024 records against non-conference foes:

Regular season

Power Five Conferences	Record
ACC	2–2
Big 12	2–1
Big Ten	0–8
Notre Dame	0–1
Pac-12	0–0
SEC	0–5
Power 5 Total	4–17
Other FBS Conferences	Record
American	1–2
C-USA	0–3
Independents (Excluding Notre Dame)	3–0
Mountain West	1–2
Sun Belt	1–2
Other FBS Total	6–9
FCS Opponents	Record
Football Championship Subdivision	10–2
Total Non-Conference Record	20–28

Postseason

Power Five Conferences	Record
ACC	0–0
Big 12	0–0
Big Ten	0–1
Notre Dame	0–0
Pac-12	0–0
SEC	0–0
Power 5 Total	0–1
Other FBS Conferences	Record
American	0–0
C-USA	0–0
Independents (Excluding Notre Dame)	0–0
Mountain West	0–1
Sun Belt	2-2
Other FBS Total	2–3
Total Bowl Record	2–4

=== Mid-American vs Power 5 matchups ===
This is a list of games the MAC has scheduled versus power conference teams (ACC, Big Ten, Big 12, Pac-12, Notre Dame and SEC). All rankings are from the current AP Poll at the time of the game.

Date	Conference	Visitor	Home	Site	Score
August 31	Big 12	Kent State	UCF	FBC Mortgage Stadium • Orlando, FL	L 6–56
September 1	ACC	Miami (OH)	Miami (FL)	Hard Rock Stadium • Miami, FL	L 3–38
September 1	Big Ten	Central Michigan	Michigan State	Spartan Stadium • East Lansing, MI	L 7–31
September 2	SEC	Ball State	Kentucky	Kroger Field • Lexington, KY	L 14–44
September 2	Big Ten	Buffalo	No. 19 Wisconsin	Camp Randall Stadium • Madison, WI	L 17–38
September 2	ACC	Northern Illinois	Boston College	Alumni Stadium • Chestnut Hill, MA	W 27–24 ^{OT}
September 2	Big Ten	Toledo	Illinois	Memorial Stadium • Champaign, IL	L 28–30
September 9	SEC	Ball State	No. 1 Georgia	Sanford Stadium • Athens, GA	L 3–45
September 9	Big Ten	Eastern Michigan	Minnesota	Huntington Bank Stadium • Minneapolis, MN	L 6–25
September 9	SEC	Kent State	Arkansas	D.W.R. Razorback Stadium • Fayetteville, AR	L 6–28
September 9	ACC	Western Michigan	Syracuse	JMA Wireless Dome • Syracuse, NY	L 7–48
September 16	SEC	Akron	Kentucky	Kroger Field • Lexington, KY	L 3–35
September 16	Big Ten	Bowling Green	No. 2 Michigan	Michigan Stadium • Ann Arbor, MI	L 6–31
September 16	Independent	Central Michigan	No. 9 Notre Dame	Notre Dame Stadium • South Bend, IN	L 17–41
September 16	Big 12	Iowa State	Ohio	Peden Stadium • Athens, OH	W 10–7
September 16	Big 12	Miami (OH)	Cincinnati	Nippert Stadium • Cincinnati, OH	W 31–24 ^{OT}
September 16	Big Ten	Northern Illinois	Nebraska	Memorial Stadium • Lincoln, NE	L 11–35
September 16	Big Ten	Western Michigan	No. 25 Iowa	Kinnick Stadium • Iowa City, IA	L 10–41
September 23	Big Ten	Akron	Indiana	Memorial Stadium • Bloomington, IN	L 27–29 ^{4OT}
September 30	ACC	Bowling Green	Georgia Tech	Bobby Dodd Stadium • Atlanta, GA	W 38–27
October 7	SEC	Western Michigan	Mississippi State	Davis Wade Stadium • Starkville, MS	L 28–41

=== Mid-American vs Group of Five matchups ===
The following games include MAC teams competing against teams from the American, C-USA, Mountain West or Sun Belt.

Date	Conference	Visitor	Home	Site	Score
August 26	MWC	Ohio	San Diego State	Snapdragon Stadium • San Diego, CA	L 13–20
September 2	American	Akron	Temple	Lincoln Financial Field • Philadelphia, PA	L 21–24
September 2	CUSA	Bowling Green	Liberty	Williams Stadium • Lynchburg, VA	L 24–34
September 9	American	Ohio	Florida Atlantic	FAU Stadium • Boca Raton, FL	W 17–10
September 16	CUSA	Liberty	Buffalo	UB Stadium • Buffalo, NY	L 27–55
September 16	MWC	San Jose State	Toledo	Glass Bowl • Toledo, OH	W 21–17
September 23	Sun Belt	Central Michigan	South Alabama	Hancock Whitney Stadium • Mobile, AL	W 34–30
September 23	CUSA	Eastern Michigan	Jacksonville State	Burgess–Snow Field at JSU Stadium • Jacksonville, AL	L 0–21
September 23	Sun Belt	Georgia Southern	Ball State	Scheumann Stadium • Muncie, IN	L 3–40
September 23	MWC	Kent State	Fresno State	Valley Children's Stadium • Fresno, CA	L 10–53
September 23	American	Tulsa	Northern Illinois	Huskie Stadium • DeKalb, IL	L 14–22
September 23	SunBelt	Buffalo	Louisiana	Cajun Field • Lafayette, LA	L 38–45

=== Mid-American vs FBS independents matchups ===
The following games include MAC teams competing against FBS Independents, which includes Army, UConn, or UMass.

Date	Visitor	Home	Site	Score
September 9	Miami (OH)	UMass	Warren McGuirk Alumni Stadium • Hadley, MA	W 41–28
September 16	UMass	Eastern Michigan	Rynearson Stadium • Ypsilanti, MI	W 19–17
October 7	Toledo	UMass	Warren McGuirk Alumni Stadium • Hadley, MA	W 41–24

=== Mid-American vs. FCS matchups ===
The following games include MAC teams competing against FCS schools.

Date	Visitor	Home	Site	Score
August 31	Saint Francis (PA)	Western Michigan	Waldo Stadium • Kalamazoo, MI	W 35–17
September 1	Howard	Eastern Michigan	Rynearson Stadium • Ypsilanti, MI	W 33–23
September 2	LIU	Ohio	Peden Stadium • Athens, OH	W 27–10
September 9	Eastern Illinois	Bowling Green	Doyt Perry Stadium • Bowling Green, OH	W 38–15
September 9	Fordham	Buffalo	UB Stadium • Buffalo, NY	L 37–40
September 9	Morgan State	Akron	InfoCision Stadium–Summa Field • Akron, OH	W 24–21
September 9	No. 11 (FCS) New Hampshire	Central Michigan	Kelly/Shorts Stadium • Mount Pleasant, MI	W 45–42
September 9	No. 24 (FCS) Southern Illinois	Northern Illinois	Huskie Stadium • DeKalb, IL	L 11–14
September 9	Texas Southern	Toledo	Glass Bowl • Toledo, OH	W 71–3
September 16	Indiana State	Ball State	Scheumann Stadium • Muncie, IN	W 45–7
September 16	Central Connecticut	Kent State	Dix Stadium • Kent, OH	W 38–10
September 23	Delaware State	Miami (OH)	Yager Stadium • Oxford, OH	W 62–20

== Head to head matchups ==
2023 MAC Head to head
Team	Akron	Ball State	Buffalo	Bowling Green	Central Michigan	Eastern Michigan	Kent State	Miami	Northern Illinois	Ohio	Toledo	Western Michigan
Akron	—	—	10–13	14–41	10–17	27–30	31–27	0–19	14–55	14–25	—	—
Ball State	—	—	—	21–24	24–17	10–24	34–3	15–17	20–17	—	6–13	24–42
Buffalo	13–10	—	—	14–24	37–13	11–24	24–6	10–23	—	10–20	13–31	—
Bowling Green	41–14	24–21	24–14	—	—	—	49–19	0–27	—	7–38	31–32	34–10
Central Michigan	17–10	17–24	13–37	—	—	26–23	—	—	37–31	20–34	17–31	28–38
Eastern Michigan	30–27	24–10	24–11	—	23–26	—	28–14	—	13–20	—	23–49	21–45
Kent State	27–31	3–34	6–24	49–19	—	14–28	—	3–23	27–37	17–42	—	—
Miami	19–0	17–15	23–10	27–0	—	—	23–3	—	—	30–16	17–21	34–21
Northern Illinois	55–14	17–20	—	—	31–37	20–13	37–26	—	—	23–13	33–35	24–0
Ohio	25–14	—	20–10	38–7	34–20	—	42–17	16–30	13–23	—	—	20–17
Toledo	—	13–6	31–14	32–31	32–17	49–23	—	21–17	35–33	—	—	49–31
Western Michigan	—	42–24	—	10–34	38–28	45–21	—	21–34	0–24	17–20	31–49	—

Updated through end of regular season

== Awards and honors ==
=== Player of the week honors ===
==== East Division ====
Week	Offensive			Defensive			Special Teams		
Week	Player	Team	Position	Player	Team	Position	Player	Team	Position
Week 1	Sieh Bangura	Ohio	RB	Bryce Houston	Ohio	LB	Alec Bevelhimer	Miami	P
Week 2	Gage Larvadain	Miami	WR	CJ Nunnally	Akron	DL	Graham Nicholson	Miami	K
Week 3	Brett Gabbert	Miami	QB	Matt Salopek; Bryce Houston (2)	Miami; Ohio	LB; LB	Alec Bevelhimer (2)	Miami	P
Week 4	DJ Irons	Akron	QB	Keye Thompson	Ohio	LB	Graham Nicholson (2)	Miami	K
Week 5	Terion Stewart	Bowling Green	RB	Deshawn Jones Jr.	Bowling Green	CB	Anthony Venneri	Buffalo	P
Week 6	Miles Cross	Ohio	WR	Devin Grant	Buffalo	S	Alex McNulty	Buffalo	K
Week 7	Brett Gabbert (2)	Miami	QB	Davon Ferguson	Bowling Green	CB	Graham Nicholson (3)	Miami	K
Week 8	Terion Stewart (2)	Bowling Green	RB	Darren Anders	Bowling Green	LB	Jack Wilson	Ohio	P
Week 9/10	Jeff Undercuffler	Akron	QB	Matt Salopek (2)	Miami	LB	Graham Nicholson (4)	Miami	K
Week 11	Ta'ron Keith	Bowling Green	RB	Keye Thompson (2)	Ohio	LB	Alec Bevelhimer (3)	Miami	P
Week 12	Sieh Bangura (2)	Ohio	RB	Michael Dowell	Miami	DB	Graham Nicholson (5)	Miami	K
Week 13	Kurtis Rourke	Ohio	QB	Jordan Porter	Bowling Green	DL	Jack Wilson (2)	Ohio	P

==== West Division ====
Week	Offensive			Defensive			Special Teams		
Week	Player	Team	Position	Player	Team	Position	Player	Team	Position
Week 1	Dequan Finn; Jalen Buckley	Toledo; Western Michigan	QB; RB	Terrance Taylor	Toledo	OLB	Hamze El-Zayat	Eastern Michigan	KR/WR
Week 2	Bert Emanuel, Jr.	Central Michigan	QB	Judge Culpepper	Toledo	DT	Marion Lukes	Central Michigan	KR/RB
Week 3	Peny Boone	Toledo	RB	Bennett Walker	Eastern Michigan	DB	Mitchell Tomasek	Eastern Michigan	P
Week 4	Jase Bauer	Central Michigan	QB	Emmanuel McNeil-Warren	Toledo	S	Mitchell Tomasek (2)	Eastern Michigan	P
Week 5	Treyson Bourguet	Western Michigan	QB	Kyle Moretti	Central Michigan	LB	Jacquez Stuart	Toledo	KR/RB
Week 6	Antario Brown	Northern Illinois	RB	Joe Sparacio	Eastern Michigan	LB	Luke Pawlak	Toledo	K
Week 7	Peny Boone (2)	Toledo	RB	Alex Merritt	Eastern Michigan	DL	Kanon Woodill	Northern Illinois	K
Week 8	Marquez Cooper	Ball State	RB	Sidney Houston Jr.	Ball State	DL	Tom Foley	NIU	P
Week 9/10	Marion Lukes	Central Michigan	RB	Joe Sparacio (2); Marshawn Kneeland	Eastern Michigan; Western Michigan	LB; DE	Jacquez Stuart (2)	Toledo	KR
Week 11	Dequan Finn (2)	Toledo	QB	Tyler Jackson	Northern Illinois	LB	Palmer Domschke	Western Michigan	K
Week 12	Dequan Finn (3)	Toledo	QB	Chase Kline	Eastern Michigan	LB	Dane Partridge	Northern Illinois	WR/PR
Week 13	Peny Boone (3)	Toledo	RB	Ray Thomas	Northern Illinois	DE	Mitchell Tomasek (3)	Eastern Michigan	P

=== MAC Individual Awards ===
The following individuals received postseason honors as voted by the Mid-American Conference football coaches at the end of the season.

Award	Player	School
Offensive Player of the Year	Peny Boone	Toledo
Defensive Player of the Year	Matt Salopek	Miami
Special Teams Player of the Year	Graham Nicholson	Miami
Freshman Player of the Year	Jalen Buckley	Western Michigan
Vern Smith Leadership Award	Dequan Finn	Toledo
Coach of the Year	Jason Candle	Toledo

=== All-Conference Teams ===
The following players were listed as part of the All-Conference teams.

Position	Player	Team
First Team Offense
QB	Dequan Finn	Toledo
OL	Corey Stewart	Ball State
OL	Nolan Potter	Northern Illinois
OL	Nick Rosi	Toledo
OL	Vinny Sciury	Toledo
OL	Jacob Gideon	Western Michigan
TE	Harold Fannin Jr.	Bowling Green
WR	Chrishon McCray	Kent State
WR	Sam Wiglusz	Ohio
WR	Jerjuan Newton	Toledo
WR	Kenneth Womack	Western Michigan
RB	Antario Brown	Northern Illinois
RB	Peny Boone	Toledo
PK	Graham Nicholson	Miami
First Team Defense
DL	CJ Nunnally	Akron
DL	Sidney Houston	Ball State
DL	Caiden Woullard	Miami
DL	Judge Culpepper	Toledo
LB	Matt Salopek	Miami
LB	Bryce Houston	Ohio
LB	Keye Thompson	Ohio
LB	Dallas Gant	Toledo
DB	Jalen Huskey	Bowling Green
DB	Devin Grant	Buffalo
DB	Quinyon Mitchell	Toledo
DB	Maxen Hook	Toledo
P	Mitchell Tomasek	Eastern Michigan
First Team Specialists
KRS	Marion Lukes	Central Michigan
KRS	Jacquez Stuart	Toledo

Position	Player	Team
Second Team Offense
QB	Kurtis Rourke	Ohio
OL	Deiyantei Powell-Woods	Central Michigan
OL	Brayden Swartout	Central Michigan
OL	Brian Dooley	Eastern Michigan
OL	Will Jados	Miami
OL	Reid Holskey	Miami
TE	Anthony Torres	Toledo
WR	Daniel George	Akron
WR	Jasaiah Gathings	Akron
WR	Tanner Knue	Eastern Michigan
WR	Jesse Prewitt III	Central Michigan
RB	Marquez Cooper	Ball State
RB	Terion Stewart	Bowling Green
PK	Andrew Glass	Kent State
Second Team Defense
DL	Jacques Bristol	Central Michigan
DL	Brian Ugwu	Miami
DL	James Ester	Northern Illinois
DL	Marshawn Kneeland	Western Michigan
LB	Cole Pearce	Ball State
LB	Darren Anders	Bowling Green
LB	Joe Sparacio	Eastern Michigan
LB	Ty Wise	Miami
DB	Jordan Oladokun	Bowling Green
DB	Donte Kent	Central Michigan
DB	Yahsyn McKee	Miami
DB	JaVaughn Byrd	Northern Illinois
P	Alec Bevelhimer	Miami
Second Team Specialists
KRS	Jaylon Jackson	Eastern Michigan
KRS	Cade McDonald	Miami

Position	Player	Team
Third Team Offense
QB	Brett Gabbert	Miami
OL	Damon Kaylor	Ball State
OL	Alex Wollschlaeger	Bowling Green
OL	Gabe Wallace	Buffalo
OL	Tyler Doty	Buffalo
OL	Addison West	Western Michigan
TE	Tanner Koziol	Ball State
WR	Odieu Hiliare	Bowling Green
WR	Luke Floriea	Kent State
WR	Trayvon Rudolph	Northern Illinois
WR	Anthony Sambucci	Western Michigan
RB	Rashad Amos	Miami
RB	Jalen Buckley	Western Michigan
PK	Luke Pawlak	Toledo
Third Team Defense
DL	CJ West	Kent State
DL	Vonnie Watkins	Ohio
DL	Rayyan Buell	Ohio
DL	Darius Alexander	Toledo
LB	Bryan McCoy	Akron
LB	Cashius Howell	Bowling Green
LB	Kyle Moretti	Central Michigan
LB	Chase Kline	Eastern Michigan
DB	KJ Martin	Akron
DB	Davon Ferguson	Bowling Green
DB	Chris McDonald Jr.	Toledo
DB	Keni-H Lovely	Western Michigan
P	Lucas Borrow	Ball State
Third Team Specialists
KRS	Jhaylin Embry	Central Michigan
KRS	Ron Cook	Buffalo

=== National Awards ===
- Lou Groza Award: Graham Nicholson, Miami

=== All-Americans ===
Currently, the NCAA compiles consensus all-America teams in the sports of Division I-FBS football and Division I men's basketball using a point system computed from All-America teams named by coaches associations or media sources. The system consists of three points for a first-team honor, two points for second-team honor, and one point for third-team honor. Honorable mention and fourth team or lower recognitions are not accorded any points. College Football All-American consensus teams are compiled by position and the player accumulating the most points at each position is named first team consensus all-American. Currently, the NCAA recognizes All-Americans selected by the AP, AFCA, FWAA, TSN, and the WCFF to determine Consensus and Unanimous All-Americans. Any player named to the First Team by all five of the NCAA-recognized selectors is deemed a Unanimous All-American.

Position	Player	School	Selector	Unanimous	Consensus
First Team All-Americans
CB	Quinyon Mitchell	Toledo	The Athletic		
K	Graham Nicholson	Miami	AFCA, AP, CBS, ESPN, FOX, SI, The Athletic, TSN, USAT, WCFF		*

Position	Player	School	Selector	Unanimous	Consensus
Second Team All-Americans
CB	Quinyon Mitchell	Toledo	AFCA, AP, CBS, FWAA, PFF, TSN		
K	Graham Nicholson	Miami	FWAA		

== NFL draft ==
The NFL draft will be held at Campus Martius Park in Detroit. The Following list includes all MAC Players in the draft.

=== List of selections ===
Player	Position	School	Draft Round	Round Pick	Overall Pick	Team
Quinyon Mitchell	CB	Toledo	1	22	22	Philadelphia Eagles
Marshawn Kneeland	DE	Western Michigan	2	24	56	Dallas Cowboys
