= Devin Grant =

American football player (born 2004)

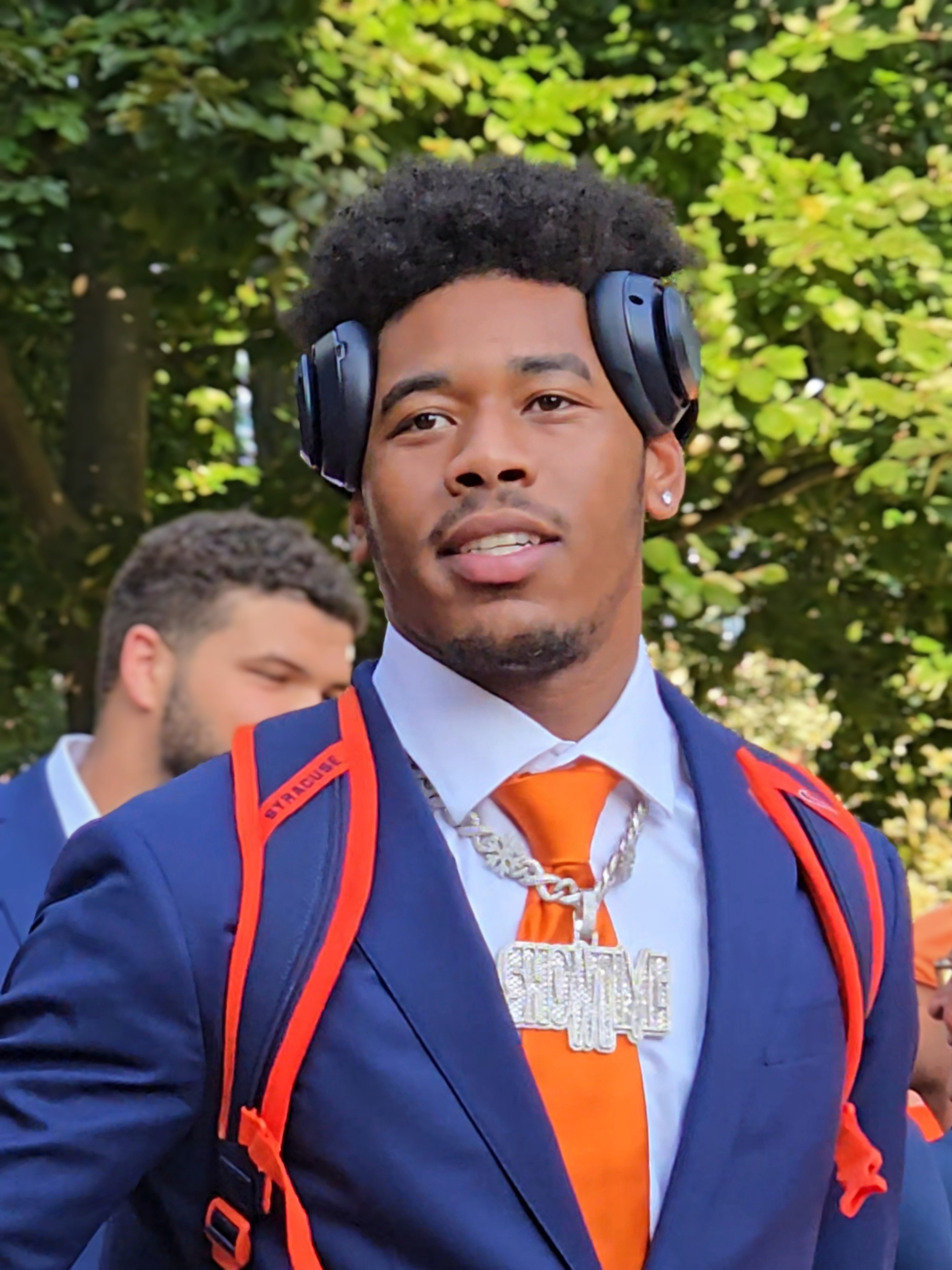

DC Defenders
- Position: Safety
- Roster status: Unsigned draft pick

Personal information
- Listed height: 6 ft 4 in (1.93 m)
- Listed weight: 206 lb (93 kg)

Career information
- High school: Holy Cross (Flushing, Queens, New York)
- College: Buffalo (2022–2023); Syracuse (2024–2025)
- NFL draft: 2026: undrafted

Career history
- Los Angeles Chargers (2026)*; Calgary Stampeders (2026)*; DC Defenders (2027-present)
- * Offseason or practice squad member only

Awards and highlights
- First-team All-MAC (2023)
- Stats at ESPN

Devin Grant is an American professional football safety. He previously played college football for the Buffalo Bulls and the Syracuse Orange.

== Early life ==
Grant attended Holy Cross High School in Queens, where he played both sides of the ball for the football team. On offense, he completed 98 of his 192 passing attempts for 1,542 yards and 17 touchdowns with ten interceptions, rushed for 1,235 yards and 13 touchdowns, and had 14 receptions for 254 yards and five touchdowns. On defense, he totaled 102 tackles with 11 going for a loss, 20 pass deflections, 15 interceptions, three blocked field, three fumble recoveries, two forced fumbles, and two defensive touchdowns. Grant was rated a four-star recruit and committed to play college football at the University of Buffalo over offers from Albany, Army, Fordham and James Madison.

== College career ==
=== Buffalo ===
As a freshman in 2022, Grant tallied nine tackles. In the 2023 season opener, he recorded his first career interception in a loss to Wisconsin. In week 5, Grant notched ten tackles and blocked a potential game-tying field goal in overtime to help the Bulls beat Akron. In week 6, he recorded four tackles and three interceptions, two of which he returned for touchdowns, to help beat Central Michigan. Grant was named the National Defensive Player of the Week. He finished the season with 79 total tackles (55 solo and 24 assisted), 1.5 tackles for loss for two yards, five interceptions for 167 yards and two touchdowns, eight pass breakups, one forced fumble and two fumble recoveries.

On December 11, 2023, Grant announced that he would be entering the NCAA transfer portal.

=== Syracuse ===
On December 18, 2023, Grant announced that he would be transferring to Syracuse.

== Professional career ==
Pre-draft measurables
Height	Weight	Arm length	Hand span	Wingspan	40-yard dash	10-yard split	20-yard split	20-yard shuttle	Three-cone drill	Vertical jump	Broad jump	Bench press
6 ft 3 1/8 in (1.91 m)	206 lb (93 kg)	31 1/2 in (0.80 m)	9 5/8 in (0.24 m)	6 ft 6 3/8 in (1.99 m)	4.38 s	1.61 s	2.64 s	4.35 s	6.98 s	36.5 in (0.93 m)	10 ft 6 in (3.20 m)	11 reps
All values from Pro Day

=== Los Angeles Chargers ===
After going undrafted in the 2026 NFL draft, Grant signed with the Los Angeles Chargers as an undrafted free agent. He was waived on August 30, 2026.

=== Calgary Stampeders ===
On September 16, 2026, Grant signed with the Calgary Stampeders practice squad of the Canadian Football League (CFL). On October 15, he was released.

== Personal life ==
Grant is the nephew of NFL safety Dean Marlowe.
