= 2023 Eastern Michigan Eagles football team =

American college football season

2023 Eastern Michigan Eagles football

68 Ventures Bowl, L 10–59 vs. South Alabama
- Conference: Mid-American Conference
- West Division
- Record: 6–7 (4–4 MAC)
- Head coach: Chris Creighton (10th season)
- Offensive coordinator: Mike Piatkowski (1st season)
- Offensive scheme: Spread
- Defensive coordinator: Ben Needham (1st season)
- Base defense: 4–2–5
- Home stadium: Rynearson Stadium

2023 Mid-American Conference football standings
	Conf.			Overall
Team	W		L	W		L
East Division
Miami (OH) xy$	7	–	1	11	–	3
Ohio	6	–	2	10	–	3
Bowling Green	5	–	3	7	–	6
Buffalo	3	–	5	3	–	9
Akron	1	–	7	2	–	10
Kent State	0	–	8	1	–	11
West Division
Toledo xy	8	–	0	11	–	3
Northern Illinois	5	–	3	7	–	6
Eastern Michigan	4	–	4	6	–	7
Central Michigan	3	–	5	5	–	7
Ball State	3	–	5	4	–	8
Western Michigan	3	–	5	4	–	8
Championship: Miami (OH) 23, Toledo 14
$ – Conference champion; x – Division champion/co-champions; y – Championship game participant

The 2023 Eastern Michigan Eagles football team represented Eastern Michigan University during the 2023 NCAA Division I FBS football season. The Eagles were led by tenth-year head coach Chris Creighton and played their home games at Rynearson Stadium in Ypsilanti, Michigan. They competed as members of the West Division of the Mid-American Conference (MAC). They finished the regular season 6–6 and 4–4 in conference play. They would end the season losing 10–59 to South Alabama in the 68 Ventures Bowl.

The Eastern Michigan Eagles football team drew an average home attendance of 16,882 in 2023.

== Preseason ==
=== Preseason awards ===
- Samson Evans: Maxwell Award preseason watchlist

=== Preseason coaches poll ===
On July 20, the MAC announced the preseason coaches poll. Eastern Michigan was picked to finish second in the West Division.

== Schedule ==
Date	Time	Opponent	Site	TV	Result	Attendance
September 1	6:30 p.m.	Howard*	Rynearson Stadium; Ypsilanti, MI	ESPN+	W 33–23	18,065
September 9	7:30 p.m.	at Minnesota*	Huntington Bank Stadium; Minneapolis, MN	BTN	L 6–25	48,101
September 16	2:00 p.m.	UMass*	Rynearson Stadium; Ypsilanti, MI	ESPN+	W 19–17	16,138
September 23	5:00 p.m.	at Jacksonville State*	Burgess–Snow Field at JSU Stadium; Jacksonville, AL	ESPN+	L 0–21	20,966
September 30	1:30 p.m.	at Central Michigan	Kelly/Shorts Stadium; Mount Pleasant, MI (Michigan MAC Trophy)	ESPN+	L 23–26	28,323
October 7	3:30 p.m.	Ball State^{†}	Rynearson Stadium; Ypsilanti, MI	ESPN+	W 24–10	18,696
October 14	12:00 p.m.	Kent State	Rynearson Stadium; Ypsilanti, MI	CBSSN	W 28–14	18,443
October 21	3:30 p.m.	at Northern Illinois	Huskie Stadium; DeKalb, IL	ESPN+	L 13–20	9,458
October 28	1:00 p.m.	Western Michigan	Rynearson Stadium; Ypsilanti, MI (Michigan MAC Trophy)	ESPN+	L 21–45	16,297
November 8	7:30 p.m.	at Toledo	Glass Bowl; Toledo, OH	ESPN2	L 23–49	17,842
November 14	7:00 p.m.	Akron	Rynearson Stadium; Ypsilanti, MI	CBSSN	W 30–27 ^{2OT}	13,664
November 21	7:30 p.m.	at Buffalo	University at Buffalo Stadium; Amherst, NY	ESPN2	W 24–11	11,243
December 23	7:00 p.m.	at South Alabama	Hancock Whitney Stadium; Mobile, AL (68 Ventures Bowl)	ESPN	L 10–59	20,926
*Non-conference game; ^{†}Homecoming; Rankings from AP Poll released prior to the game; All times are in Eastern time

== Game summaries ==
=== at Buffalo ===
Eastern Michigan Eagles (5–6) vs. Buffalo Bulls (3–8) – Game summary

Quarter	1	2	3	4	Total
Eagles	7	17	0	0	24
Bulls	0	0	8	3	11

at University at Buffalo Stadium • Amherst, New York

- Date: November 21, 2023
- Game time: 7:30 p.m.
- Game weather: 40 °F (4 °C); Rain
- Game attendance: 11,243
- Referee: Billy Williams
- TV announcers (ESPN2): Matt Schick (play-by-play) and Dustin Fox (analyst)

Game information

First quarter

- EMU – (7:20) Austin Smith 5-yard run, Jesus Gomez kick (Drive: 8 plays, 62 yards, 4:09; Eastern Michigan 7–0)

Second quarter

- EMU – (8:41) Jaylon Jackson 19-yard pass from Austin Smith, Jesus Gomez kick (Drive: 11 plays, 80 yards, 4:49; Eastern Michigan 14–0)
- EMU – (4:21) Jesus Gomez 29-yard field goal (Drive: 8 plays, 22 yards, 4:13; Eastern Michigan 17–0)
- EMU – (0:07) Samson Evans 1-yard run, Jesus Gomez kick (Drive: 8 plays, 95 yards, 2:02; Eastern Michigan 24–0)

Third quarter

- UB – (4:45) Ron Cook 6-yard run, Cameron Ball pass (Drive: 10 plays, 56 yards, 4:30; Eastern Michigan 24–8)

Fourth quarter

- UB – (6:01) Alex McNulty 40-yard field goal (Drive: 7 plays, 50 yards, 2:20; Eastern Michigan 24–11)

Statistics	EMU	UB
First downs	21	18
Plays–yards	73–367	58–337
Rushes–yards	46–226	30–163
Passing yards	141	174
Passing: comp–att–int	19–27–0	12–28–0
Time of possession	34:52	24:37

Team	Category	Player	Statistics
Eastern Michigan	Passing	Austin Smith	19/27, 141 yards, TD
Eastern Michigan	Rushing	Samson Evans	22 carries, 127 yards, TD
Eastern Michigan	Receiving	JB Mitchell	7 receptions, 75 yards
Buffalo	Passing	Cole Snyder	11/26, 135 yards
Buffalo	Rushing	Ron Cook; CJ Ogbonna	10 carries, 43 yards, TD; 6 carries, 43 yards
Buffalo	Receiving	Marlyn Johnson	4 receptions, 80 yards

=== South Alabama (68 Ventures Bowl) ===
Eastern Michigan Eagles (6–6) vs. South Alabama Jaguars (6–6) (68 Ventures Bowl)

Quarter	1	2	3	4	Total
Jaguars	17	21	21	0	59
Eagles	0	3	0	7	10

at Hancock Whitney Stadium • Mobile, Alabama

- Date: December 23, 2023
- Game time: 7:00 p.m. EST
- Game weather: Cloudy • Temperature: 64 °F (18 °C) • Wind: 4 mph (6.4 km/h) SE
- Game attendance: 20,926
- Referee: Cal McNeill
- TV announcers (ESPN): Taylor Zarzour (play-by-play), Matt Stinchcomb (analyst), and Alyssa Lang (sideline)
- Box score

Game information

First Quarter

- (10:50) USA – Diego Guajardo 46 yard field goal (Drive: 11 plays, 55 yards, 4:10; South Alabama 3–0)
- (7:37) USA – DJ Thomas-Jones 3 yard pass from Desmond Trotter, Diego Guajardo kick (Drive: 5 plays, 63 yards, 2:19; South Alabama 10–0)
- (3:30) USA – Jamaal Pritchett 5 yard pass from Gio Lopez, Diego Guajardo kick (Drive: 6 plays, 65 yards, 2:38; South Alabama 17–0)

Second Quarter

- (14:50) EMU – Jesús Gómez 49 yard field goal (Drive: 4 plays, 4 yards, 1:10; South Alabama 17–3)
- (10:15) USA – Kentrel Bullock 17 yard run, Diego Guajardo kick (Drive: 8 plays, 62 yards, 4:35; South Alabama 24–3)
- (8:07) USA – DJ Thomas-Jones 20 yard pass from Gio Lopez, Diego Guajardo kick (Drive: 4 plays, 37 yards, 1:54; South Alabama 31–3)
- (1:39) USA – Jamaal Pritchett 42 yard pass from Gio Lopez, Diego Guajardo kick (Drive: 5 plays, 75 yards, 1:06; South Alabama 38–3)

Third Quarter

- (11:07) USA – Desmond Trotter 3 yard run, Diego Guajardo kick (Drive: 5 plays, 34 yards, 2:05; South Alabama 45–3)
- (7:50) USA – Gio Lopez 27 yard run, Diego Guajardo kick (Drive: 3 plays, 43 yards, 0:55; South Alabama 52–3)
- (2:07) USA – PJ Martin 6 yard run, Diego Guajardo kick (Drive: 8 plays, 74 yards, 3:31; South Alabama 59–3)

Fourth Quarter

- (0:58) EMU – Cam'Ron McCoy 10 yard run, Jesús Gómez kick (Drive: 13 plays, 70 yards, 7:27; South Alabama 59–10)

Following the game, an altercation took place on-field between the teams prior to the trophy presentation, initiated by an Eastern Michigan player sucker punching a South Alabama player while the South Alabama marching band and team were singing the school's alma mater. Eastern Michigan's athletic director apologized the next day, stating (in part) "We strongly condemn the actions of some of the student-athletes".

Statistics	USA	EMU
First downs	29	10
Total yards	627	150
Rushing yards	320	77
Passing yards	307	73
Passing: comp–att–int	23–36–1	12–30–2
Time of possession	30:53	29:07

Team	Category	Player	Statistics
South Alabama	Passing	Gio Lopez	14/19, 192 yards, 3 TD
South Alabama	Rushing	Gio Lopez	7 carries, 88 yards, TD
South Alabama	Receiving	Jamaal Pritchett	8 receptions, 127 yards, 2 TD
Eastern Michigan	Passing	Cam'Ron McCoy	12/27, 73 yards, 2 INT
Eastern Michigan	Rushing	Cam'Ron McCoy	13 carries, 73 yards, TD
Eastern Michigan	Receiving	Terry Lockett Jr.	2 receptions, 29 yards

== Post Season Awards ==
- Brian Dooley (Disney Spirit Award)
