= 2023 68 Ventures Bowl =

Postseason college football bowl game

- 25th 68 Ventures Bowl
South Alabama Jaguars	Eastern Michigan Eagles
(6–6)	(6–6)
Sun Belt	MAC
59	10
Head coach: Kane Wommack	Head coach: Chris Creighton
	1	2	3	4	Total
South Alabama	17	21	21	0	59
Eastern Michigan	0	3	0	7	10
- Date: December 23, 2023
- Season: 2023
- Stadium: Hancock Whitney Stadium
- Location: Mobile, Alabama
- MVP: Gio Lopez (QB, South Alabama)
- Favorite: South Alabama by 15.5
- Referee: Cal McNeill (Mountain West)
- Attendance: 20,926

United States TV coverage
- Network: ESPN
- Announcers: Taylor Zarzour (play-by-play), Matt Stinchcomb (analyst), and Alyssa Lang (sideline)

The 2023 68 Ventures Bowl was a college football bowl game played on December 23, 2023, at Hancock Whitney Stadium in Mobile, Alabama. The 25th annual 68 Ventures Bowl (although the first edition played under that name) featured the Eastern Michigan Eagles from the Mid-American Conference (MAC) and the South Alabama Jaguars from the Sun Belt Conference. The game began at approximately 7:00 p.m. CST and was aired on ESPN. The 68 Ventures Bowl was one of the 2023–24 bowl games concluding the 2023 FBS football season. 68 Ventures—an Alabama-based company involved in Gulf Coast development, investment, and construction—was the title sponsor of the game.

== Teams ==
Consistent with conference tie-ins, the bowl featured the Eastern Michigan Eagles of the Mid-American Conference (MAC) and the South Alabama Jaguars of the Sun Belt Conference.

This was the first time that Eastern Michigan and South Alabama played each other. While Hancock Whitney Stadium is the regular-season home stadium of South Alabama, Eastern Michigan was designated the home team for the bowl.

=== Eastern Michigan Eagles ===
The Eagles entered the game with a 6–6 record (4–4 in the MAC), finishing in third place in their conference's West Division.

This was Eastern Michigan's second 68 Ventures Bowl; they previously appeared in the 2021 LendingTree Bowl (when the bowl operated under a different name), which they lost.

=== South Alabama Jaguars ===
The Jaguars entered the game with a 6–6 record (4–4 in the Sun Belt), tied for second place in their conference's West Division.

This was South Alabama's first 68 Ventures Bowl.

== Game summary ==
2023 68 Ventures Bowl

Quarter	1	2	3	4	Total
South Alabama	17	21	21	0	59
Eastern Michigan	0	3	0	7	10

at Hancock Whitney Stadium • Mobile, Alabama

- Date: Saturday, December 23, 2023
- Game time: 6:00 p.m. CST
- Game weather: Cloudy • Temperature: 64 °F (18 °C) • Wind: 4 mph (6.4 km/h) SE
- Game attendance: 20,926
- Referee: Cal McNeill
- TV announcers (ESPN): Taylor Zarzour (play-by-play), Matt Stinchcomb (analyst), and Alyssa Lang (sideline)
- Box score

Game information

First Quarter

- (10:50) USA – Diego Guajardo 46 yard field goal (Drive: 11 plays, 55 yards, 4:10; South Alabama 3–0)
- (7:37) USA – DJ Thomas-Jones 3 yard pass from Desmond Trotter, Diego Guajardo kick (Drive: 5 plays, 63 yards, 2:19; South Alabama 10–0)
- (3:30) USA – Jamaal Pritchett 5 yard pass from Gio Lopez, Diego Guajardo kick (Drive: 6 plays, 65 yards, 2:38; South Alabama 17–0)

Second Quarter

- (14:50) EMU – Jesús Gómez 49 yard field goal (Drive: 4 plays, 4 yards, 1:10; South Alabama 17–3)
- (10:15) USA – Kentrel Bullock 17 yard run, Diego Guajardo kick (Drive: 8 plays, 62 yards, 4:35; South Alabama 24–3)
- (8:07) USA – DJ Thomas-Jones 20 yard pass from Gio Lopez, Diego Guajardo kick (Drive: 4 plays, 37 yards, 1:54; South Alabama 31–3)
- (1:39) USA – Jamaal Pritchett 42 yard pass from Gio Lopez, Diego Guajardo kick (Drive: 5 plays, 75 yards, 1:06; South Alabama 38–3)

Third Quarter

- (11:07) USA – Desmond Trotter 3 yard run, Diego Guajardo kick (Drive: 5 plays, 34 yards, 2:05; South Alabama 45–3)
- (7:50) USA – Gio Lopez 27 yard run, Diego Guajardo kick (Drive: 3 plays, 43 yards, 0:55; South Alabama 52–3)
- (2:07) USA – PJ Martin 6 yard run, Diego Guajardo kick (Drive: 8 plays, 74 yards, 3:31; South Alabama 59–3)

Fourth Quarter

- (0:58) EMU – Cam'Ron McCoy 10 yard run, Jesús Gómez kick (Drive: 13 plays, 70 yards, 7:27; South Alabama 59–10)

Following the game, an altercation took place on-field between the teams prior to the trophy presentation, initiated by Eastern Michigan cornerback Korey Hernandez sucker punching South Alabama defensive back Jamarrien Burt while the South Alabama marching band and team were singing the school's alma mater. Eastern Michigan's athletic director apologized the next day, stating (in part) "We strongly condemn the actions of some of the student-athletes".

=== Statistics ===
Statistics	USA	EMU
First downs	29	10
Plays–yards	73–627	61–150
Rushes–yards	37–320	31–77
Passing yards	307	73
Passing: comp–att–int	23–36–1	12–30–2
Time of possession	30:53	29:07

Team	Category	Player	Statistics
South Alabama	Passing	Gio Lopez	14/19, 192 yards, 3 TD
South Alabama	Rushing	Gio Lopez	7 carries, 88 yards, TD
South Alabama	Receiving	Jamaal Pritchett	8 receptions, 127 yards, 2 TD
Eastern Michigan	Passing	Cam'Ron McCoy	12/27, 73 yards, 2 INT
Eastern Michigan	Rushing	Cam'Ron McCoy	13 carries, 73 yards, TD
Eastern Michigan	Receiving	Terry Lockett Jr.	2 receptions, 29 yards
