= Marquez Cooper =

American football player (born c.2002)

Profile
- Position: Running back

Personal information
- Born: March 7, 2002 (age 24); Gaithersburg, Maryland, U.S.
- Listed height: 5 ft 8 in (1.73 m)
- Listed weight: 184 lb (83 kg)

Career information
- High school: Quince Orchard (Gaithersburg)
- College: Kent State (2020–2022); Ball State (2023); San Diego State (2024)
- NFL draft: 2025: undrafted

Career history
- Ottawa Redblacks (2026)*
- * Offseason or practice squad member only

Awards and highlights
- First-team All-MW (2024); First-team All-MAC (2022); 2× Second-team All-MAC (2021, 2023)
- Stats at ESPN

Marquez Cooper (born March 7, 2002) is an American professional football running back. He played college football for the Kent State Golden Flashes, Ball State Cardinals, and San Diego State Aztecs.

== Early life ==
He grew up in Gaithersburg, Maryland, attended Quince Orchard High School, played for the football team, and rushed for 2,897 yards and 51 touchdowns in two seasons. He received a scholarship to play for Kent State and made his debut in the fall of 2020.

== College career ==
=== Kent State ===
In a condensed COVID-19 season, Cooper appeared and started all four games for Kent State. He made his collegiate debut against Eastern Michigan where he ran for 74 yards on 15 carries. The following week against Bowling Green, he scored his first two collegiate touchdowns. In week three against Akron, he ran for a season high 107 yards and three touchdowns. On the season, he led the Flashes with 282 yards and five touchdowns.

As a sophomore in 2021, he rushed for 1,205 yards and 11 touchdowns. This earned him First team All-MAC. In 14 games played, he ran for over 110 yards in seven games.

As a junior in 2022, he had his second consecutive 1,000-yard season. Against Ohio on October 1, he set career-highs with 40 carries and 240 rushing yards. During the 2022 season, he totaled 1,331 yards and 13 touchdowns. He was named First team All-MAC in 2022 after being on the secon team in 2021.

=== Ball State ===
On December 14, 2022, he announced that he had transferred to Ball State. In week three, Cooper ran for a season high 177 yards on 22 carries and one touchdown in a victory over Indiana State. On the season, Cooper ran for 1,043 yards on 227 carries with four touchdowns. For Cooper, this marked the third consecutive 1,000 yard rushing season. He ran for over 100 yards in four games and was named Second team All-MAC for the second time in his career.

=== San Diego State ===
On April 27, 2024, Cooper transferred to San Diego State. Cooper reunited with head coach Sean Lewis whom he had previously spent three seasons with at Kent State. He entered the season as the leading rusher in FBS with 3,856 career yards and 33 rushing touchdowns. In his first game as an Aztec, Cooper ran for 223 yards and two touchdowns on 27 carries in a victory against Texas A&M–Commerce. In week twelve, Cooper surpassed 1,000 rushing yards on the season in a loss to UNLV. Cooper tied an FBS record with four 1,000 yard rushing seasons. He became the first player in FBS history to rush for 1,000 yards with three different teams.

=== Statistics ===
Year	Team	Games		Rushing				Receiving			
Year	Team	GP	GS	Att	Yards	Avg	TD	Rec	Yards	Avg	TD
2020	Kent State	4	4	56	282	5.0	5	1	14	14.0	0
2021	Kent State	14	14	241	1,205	5.0	11	10	95	9.5	0
2022	Kent State	12	12	285	1,326	4.7	13	8	94	11.8	0
2023	Ball State	12	12	227	1,043	4.6	4	18	163	9.1	0
2024	San Diego State	12	12	292	1,274	4.4	12	20	137	6.9	2
Career		54	54	1,101	5,130	4.7	45	57	503	8.8	2

== Professional career ==
Cooperwas signed with the Ottawa Redblacks of the Canadian Football League (CFL) on December 2, 2025. He was released on May 9.
