= 2023 Kent State Golden Flashes football team =

American college football season

2023 Kent State Golden Flashes football
- Conference: Mid-American Conference
- East Division
- Record: 1–11 (0–8 MAC)
- Head coach: Kenni Burns (1st season)
- Offensive coordinator: Matt Johnson (1st season)
- Co-offensive coordinator: Matt Limegrover (1st season)
- Offensive scheme: Up-tempo spread
- Defensive coordinator: Dave Duggan (1st season)
- Base defense: 4–3
- Home stadium: Dix Stadium

2023 Mid-American Conference football standings
	Conf.			Overall
Team	W		L	W		L
East Division
Miami (OH) xy$	7	–	1	11	–	3
Ohio	6	–	2	10	–	3
Bowling Green	5	–	3	7	–	6
Buffalo	3	–	5	3	–	9
Akron	1	–	7	2	–	10
Kent State	0	–	8	1	–	11
West Division
Toledo xy	8	–	0	11	–	3
Northern Illinois	5	–	3	7	–	6
Eastern Michigan	4	–	4	6	–	7
Central Michigan	3	–	5	5	–	7
Ball State	3	–	5	4	–	8
Western Michigan	3	–	5	4	–	8
Championship: Miami (OH) 23, Toledo 14
$ – Conference champion; x – Division champion/co-champions; y – Championship game participant

The 2023 Kent State Golden Flashes football team represented Kent State University as a member of the Mid-American Conference in the 2023 NCAA Division I FBS football season. The Golden Flashes were led by former Minnesota assistant head coach Kenni Burns in his first year as Kent State's head coach. They played their home games at Dix Stadium in Kent, Ohio. They finished the season 1–11 and 0–8 in conference play to finish with the worst record in college football. The Kent State Golden Flashes football team drew an average home attendance of 9,511 in 2023.

== Preseason ==
=== Preseason poll ===
On July 20, the MAC announced the preseason coaches poll. Kent State was picked to finish last in the East.

== Schedule ==
Date	Time	Opponent	Site	TV	Result	Attendance
August 31	7:00 p.m.	at UCF*	FBC Mortgage Stadium; Orlando, FL	FS1	L 6–56	44,088
September 9	4:00 p.m.	at Arkansas*	Donald W. Reynolds Razorback Stadium; Fayetteville, AR	SECN	L 6–28	73,173
September 16	12:00 p.m.	Central Connecticut (FCS)*	Dix Stadium; Kent, OH	ESPN+	W 38–10	10,731
September 23	10:30 p.m.	at Fresno State*	Valley Children's Stadium; Fresno, CA	CBSSN	L 10–53	38,728
September 30	2:30 p.m.	Miami (OH)	Dix Stadium; Kent, OH	ESPN+	L 3–23	13,598
October 7	3:30 p.m.	at Ohio	Peden Stadium; Athens, OH	ESPN+	L 17–42	22,945
October 14	12:00 p.m.	at Eastern Michigan	Rynearson Stadium; Ypsilanti, MI	CBSSN	L 14–28	18,443
October 21	3:30 p.m.	Buffalo^{†}	Dix Stadium; Kent, OH	ESPN+	L 6–24	11,735
November 1	7:30 p.m.	at Akron	InfoCision Stadium–Summa Field; Akron, OH (Wagon Wheel)	ESPNU	L 27–31	8,113
November 8	7:00 p.m.	Bowling Green	Dix Stadium; Kent, OH	CBSSN	L 19–49	6,065
November 18	2:00 p.m.	at Ball State	Scheumann Stadium; Muncie, IN	ESPN+	L 3–34	8,554
November 25	12:00 p.m.	Northern Illinois	Dix Stadium; Kent, OH	ESPN+	L 27–37	5,427
*Non-conference game; ^{†}Homecoming; All times are in Pacific time

== Game summaries ==
=== At UCF ===
Kent State Golden Flashes at UCF Knights

Quarter	1	2	3	4	Total
Golden Flashes	3	0	3	0	6
Knights	14	14	14	14	56

at FBC Mortgage Stadium, Orlando, Florida

- Date: August 31
- Game time: 7:00 p.m. EDT
- Game weather: Cloudy, 81 °F (27 °C)
- Game attendance: 44,088
- Referee: Derek Anderson
- TV announcers (FS1): Eric Collins and Devin Gardner
- Box score, Recap

Game information

First Quarter

- UCF: Xavier Townsend 9-yard touchdown pass from John Rhys Plumlee (Colton Boomer Kick), 10:56
- UCF: John Rhys Plumlee 17-yard touchdown run (Colton Boomer Kick), 6:07
- Kent State: Andrew Glass 45-yard field goal, 3:20

Second Quarter

- UCF: Jordan McDonald 2-yard touchdown run (Colton Boomer Kick), 8:46
- UCF: Alec Holler 18-yard touchdown pass from John Rhys Plumlee (Colton Boomer Kick), 0:42

Third Quarter

- UCF: R.J. Harvey 50-yard touchdown pass from John Rhys Plumlee (Colton Boomer Kick), 10:37
- UCF: R.J. Harvey 48-yard touchdown run (Colton Boomer Kick), 4:07
- Kent State: Andrew Glass 43-yard field goal, 0:49

Fourth Quarter

- UCF: Mark-Antony Richards 7-yard touchdown run (Colton Boomer Kick), 7:26
- UCF: Demarkcus Bowman 5-yard touchdown (Colton Boomer Kick), 0:54

Statistics	KENT	UCF
First downs	15	32
Total yards	240	723
Rushing yards	95	389
Passing yards	145	334
Turnovers	1	3
Time of possession	28:34	31:26

Team	Category	Player	Statistics
Kent State	Passing	Michael Alaimo	12/31, 145 yards, INT
Kent State	Rushing	Gavin Garcia	18 rushes, 45 yards
Kent State	Receiving	Chrishon McCray	3 receptions, 61 yards
UCF	Passing	John Rhys Plumlee	22/30, 281 yards, 3 TD, INT
UCF	Rushing	Johnny Richardson	12 rushes, 100 yards
UCF	Receiving	Xavier Townsend	5 receptions, 81 yards, TD

=== At Arkansas ===
Kent State Golden Flashes at Arkansas Razorbacks

Quarter	1	2	3	4	Total
Golden Flashes	3	3	0	0	6
Razorbacks	7	7	7	7	28

at Donald W. Reynolds Razorback Stadium • Fayetteville, Arkansas

- Date: September 9
- Game time: 3:00 p.m. CDT / 4:00 p.m. EDT
- Game weather: Sunny • Temperature: 83 °F (28 °C) • Wind: northeast 8 mph (13 km/h)
- Game attendance: 73,173
- Referee: Scott Walker
- TV announcers (SECN): Dave Neal, Derek Mason, and Taylor Davis
- Box score, Recap

Game information

First quarter

- (3:24) Kent State – Andrew Glass 48-yard field goal (Drive: 11 plays, 51 yards, 6:52; Kent State 3–0)
- (1:12) Arkansas – Antonio Grier 25-yard interception return (Arkansas 7–3)

Second quarter

- (6:29) Kent State – Andrew Glass 38-yard field goal (Drive: 10 plays, 52 yards, 5:48; Arkansas 7–6)
- (2:20) Arkansas – Andrew Armstrong 5-yard pass from KJ Jefferson, Cam Little kick (Drive: 8 plays, 75 yards, 4:09; Arkansas 14–6)

Third quarter

- (5:50) Arkansas – Rashod Dubinion 1-yard rush, Cam Little kick (Drive: 12 plays, 91 yards, 6:28; Arkansas 21–6)

Fourth quarter

- (10:16) Arkansas – Andrew Armstrong 9-yard pass from KJ Jefferson, Cam Little kick (Drive: 15 plays, 73 yards, 7:54; Arkansas 28–6)

Statistics	KENT	ARK
First downs	14	19
Total yards	200	308
Rushing yards	26	172
Passing yards	174	136
Turnovers	1	0
Time of possession	27:44	32:16

Team	Category	Player	Statistics
Kent State	Passing	Michael Alaimo	11/17, 174 yards, INT
Kent State	Rushing	Gavin Garcia	18 rushes, 68 yards
Kent State	Receiving	Trell Harris	4 receptions, 78 yards
Arkansas	Passing	KJ Jefferson	13/19, 136 yards, 2 TD
Arkansas	Rushing	AJ Green	15 rushes, 82 yards
Arkansas	Receiving	Isaac TeSlaa	3 receptions, 51 yards

=== Central Connecticut ===
Central Connecticut Blue Devils at Kent State Golden Flashes – Game summary

Quarter	1	2	3	4	Total
Blue Devils	0	0	0	10	10
Golden Flashes	14	7	17	0	38

at Dix Stadium • Kent, Ohio

- Date: September 16
- Game time: 12:00 p.m. EDT
- Game weather: Sunny, 67 °F (19 °C)
- Game attendance: 10,731
- Referee: William Williams
- TV: ESPN+
- Box score, Recap

Game information
First quarter
- KENT – Gavin Garcia 2-yard run (Andrew Glass kick), 9:57. Golden Flashes 7–0. Drive: 12 plays, 76 yards, 4:56.
- KENT – Trell Harris 40-yard pass from Michael Alaimo (Andrew Glass kick), 5:21. Golden Flashes 14–0. Drive: 8 plays, 67 yards, 3:20.

Second quarter

- KENT – Gavin Garcia 25-yard run (Andrew Glass kick), 6:58. Golden Flashes 21–0. Drive: 3 plays, 44 yards, 0:57.

Third quarter

- KENT – Michael Alaimo 3-yard run (Andrew Glass kick), 10:27. Golden Flashes 28–0. Drive: 7 plays, 64 yards, 3:05.
- KENT – Andrew Glass 24-yard field goal, 7:24. Golden Flashes 31–0. Drive: 6 plays, 56 yards, 2:53.
- KENT – Jaylen Thomas 23-yard run (Andrew Glass kick), 2:28. Golden Flashes 38–0. Drive: 7 plays, 94 yards, 2:43.

Fourth quarter

- CCSU – Jake Barnum 22-yard field goal, 11:08. Golden Flashes 38–3. Drive: 6 plays, 18 yards, 2:13.
- CCSU – Ricky Ortega 17-yard run (Jake Barnum kick), 2:04. Golden Flashes 38–10. Drive: 13 plays, 72 yards, 6:57.

Statistics	CCSU	KENT
First downs	10	20
Total yards	153	467
Rushing yards	103	295
Passing yards	50	172
Turnovers	2	1
Time of possession	26:21	33:39

Team	Category	Player	Statistics
Central Connecticut	Passing	Matt Jenner	4/14, 40 yards, 2 INT
Central Connecticut	Rushing	Davion Johnson	5 rushes, 35 yards
Central Connecticut	Receiving	Michael Plaskon	1 reception, 15 yards
Kent State	Passing	Michael Alaimo	12/16, 172 yards, TD, INT
Kent State	Rushing	Gavin Garcia	21 rushes, 125 yards, 2 TD
Kent State	Receiving	Trell Harris	3 receptions, 94 yards, TD

=== At Fresno State ===
Kent State Golden Flashes at Fresno State Bulldogs – Game summary

Quarter	1	2	3	4	Total
Golden Flashes	7	3	0	0	10
Bulldogs	22	14	14	3	53

at Valley Children's Stadium • Fresno, California

- Date: September 23
- Game time: 10:30 p.m. EDT
- Game weather: Clear • Temperature: 80 °F (27 °C) • Wind: NW 7mph
- Game attendance: 38,728
- Referee: Nolan Dumas
- TV announcers (CBSSN): Dave Ryan (play-by-play) & Donte Whitner (analyst)
- Box score, Recap

Game information

First quarter

- (12:06) FRES – Erik Brooks 40-yard pass from Mikey Keene, Logan Fife two-point run (Drive: 4 plays, 55 yards, 1:38; Fresno State 8–0)
- (10:01) FRES – Elijah Gilliam 32-yard pass from Jaelen Gill, Daniel Lynch kick (Drive: 2 plays, 47 yards, 0:23; Fresno State 15–0)
- (5:48) KENT – Xavier Williams 18-yard run, Andrew Glass kick (Drive: 7 plays, 75 yards, 4:13; Fresno State 15–7)
- (3:07) FRES – Elijah Gilliam 2-yard run, Daniel Lynch kick (Drive: 6 plays, 71 yards, 2:34; Fresno State 22–7)

Second quarter

- (12:16) KENT – Andrew Glass 46-yard field goal (Drive: 13 plays, 57 yards, 5:45; Fresno State 22–10)
- (9:36) FRES – Jalen Moss 12-yard pass from Mikey Keene, Daniel Lynch kick (Drive: 7 plays, 72 yards, 2:32; Fresno State 29–10)
- (0:37) FRES – Elijah Gilliam 1-yard run, Daniel Lynch kick (Drive: 8 plays, 66 yards, 3:22; Fresno State 36–10)

Third quarter

- (9:06) FRES – Tre Watson 2-yard pass from Mikey Keene, Daniel Lynch kick (Drive: 12 plays, 74 yards, 5:46; Fresno State 43–10)
- (1:26) FRES – Jalen Moss 23-yard pass from Mikey Keene, Jalen Moss fumble in endzone recovered by Jaelen Gill, Daniel Lynch kick (Drive: 10 plays, 76 yards, 4:34; Fresno State 50–10)

Fourth quarter

- (10:05) FRES – Dylan Lynch 40-yard field goal (Drive: 9 plays, 31 yards, 4:49; Fresno State 53–10)

Statistics	KENT	FRES
First downs	11	27
Plays–yards	52–231	67–513
Rushes–yards	37–129	33–143
Passing yards	102	370
Passing: comp–att–int	8–15–0	26–34–0
Time of possession	27:39	32:21

Team	Category	Player	Statistics
Kent State	Passing	Michael Alaimo	8/15, 102 yards
Kent State	Rushing	Xavier Williams	15 rushes, 55 yards, TD
Kent State	Receiving	Jameel Gardner Jr.	2 receptions, 49 yards
Fresno State	Passing	Mikey Keene	24/31, 325 yards, 3 TD
Fresno State	Rushing	Malik Sherrod	10 rushes, 71 yards
Fresno State	Receiving	Jalen Moss	7 receptions, 120 yards, TD

=== At Ohio ===
Kent State Golden Flashes (1–4) vs. Ohio Bobcats (4–1)

Quarter	1	2	3	4	Total
Kent State	0	7	3	7	17
Ohio	0	21	14	7	42

at Peden Stadium • Athens, Ohio

- Date: Saturday, October 7, 2023
- Game time: 3:30 p.m EDT
- Game weather: sunny
- Game attendance: 22,945
- Referee: Jeremy Valentine
- TV announcers (ESPN+): Michael Reghi, Jerod Cherry
- Box score, Recap

Game information

First Quarter

- No scoring plays

Second Quarter

- (13:35) OHIO - Miles Cross 25 yd pass from Kurtis Rourke (Gianni Spetic kick) 6 plays, 55 yards, TOP 02:16 (OHIO 7–0)
- (11:20) KENT - Chrishon McCray 42 yd pass from Michael Alaimo (Andrew Glass Kick) 7 plays, 77 yards, TOP 02:09 (Tied 7–7)
- (04:05) OHIO - Sam Wiglusz 30 yd pass from Kurtis Rourke (Gianni Spetic kick) 2 plays, 45 yards, TOP 00:49 (OHIO 14–7)
- (00:37) OHIO – Kurtis Rourke 4 yd run (Gianni Spetic kick) 5 plays, 57 yards, TOP 01:53 (OHIO 21–7)

Third Quarter

- (12:18) KENT – Andrew Glass 37 yd FG 7 plays, 42 yards, TOP 02:34 (OHIO 21–10)
- (09:13) OHIO - Miles Cross 22 yd pass from Kurtis Rourke (Gianni Spetic kick) 6 plays, 90 yards, TOP 02:59 (OHIO 28–10)
- (05:39) OHIO – Sieh Bangura 3 yd run (Gianni Spetic kick) 6 plays, 31 yards, TOP 02:56 (OHIO 35–10)

Fourth Quarter

- (13:26) OHIO – Sieh Bangura 3 yd run (Gianni Spetic kick) 11 plays, 69 yards, TOP 05:31 (OHIO 42–10)
- (09:57) KENT - Chrishon McCray 10 yd pass from Tommy Ulatowski (Andrew Glass Kick) 10 plays, 76 yards, TOP 03:23 (OHIO 42–17)

Statistics	KENT	OHIO
First downs	16	24
Total yards	228	466
Rushes/yards	36/109	35/166
Passing yards	119	300
Passing: Comp–Att–Int	11–20–1	20–32–0
Time of possession	27:04	32:56

Team	Category	Player	Statistics
Kent State	Passing	Michael Alaimo	9/13, 107 yards, 1 TD, 1 INT
Kent State	Rushing	Jaylen Thomas	24 rushes, 67 yards
Kent State	Receiving	Chrishon McCray	6 receptions, 93 yards, 2 TD
Ohio	Passing	Kurtis Rourke	20/32, 300 yards, 3 TD
Ohio	Rushing	Parker Navarro	3 rushes, 65 yards
Ohio	Receiving	Miles Cross	7 receptions, 125 yards, 2 TD

=== Buffalo ===
Buffalo Bulls (2–5) vs. Kent State Golden Flashes (1–6) – Game summary

Quarter	1	2	3	4	Total
Bulls	7	7	3	7	24
Golden Flashes	6	0	0	0	6

at Dix Stadium • Kent, Ohio

- Date: October 21, 2023
- Game time: 3:30 p.m.
- Game weather: 51 °F (11 °C); Cloudy; Wind at W13 MPH
- Game attendance: 11,735
- Referee: Matt Packowski
- TV: ESPN+

Game information

First quarter

- KENT – (6:16) Andrew Glass 38-yard field goal (Drive: 9 plays, 60 yards, 4:48; Kent State 3–0)
- KENT – (4:31) Andrew Glass 37-yard field goal (Drive: 4 plays, 3 yards, 1:26; Kent State 6–0)
- UB – (6:21) Andrew Schnackenberg 2-yard pass from Cole Snyder, Alex McNulty kick (Drive: 5 plays, 75 yards, 2:27; Buffalo 7–6)

Second quarter

- UB – (9:56) Ron Cook 1-yard run, Alex McNulty kick (Drive: 11 plays, 68 yards, 5:34; Buffalo 14–6)

Third quarter

- UB – (11:55) Alex McNulty 53-yard field goal (Drive: 7 plays, 33 yards, 2:57; Buffalo 17–6)

Fourth quarter

- UB – (5:54) Al-Jay Henderson 2-yard run, Alex McNulty kick (Drive: 7 plays, 51 yards, 4:29; Buffalo 24–6)

Statistics	UB	KENT
First downs	15	10
Plays–yards	67–331	61–164
Rushes–yards	34–136	35–86
Passing yards	195	78
Passing: comp–att–int	18–33–1	12–26–1
Turnovers		
Time of possession	31:58	27:53

Team	Category	Player	Statistics
Buffalo	Passing	Cole Snyder	18/33, 195 yards, TD, INT
Buffalo	Rushing	Jacqez Barksdale	10 carries, 85 yards
Buffalo	Receiving	Marlyn Johnson	5 receptions, 64 yards
Kent State	Passing	Michael Alaimo	7/14, 51 yards
Kent State	Rushing	Jaylen Thomas	17 carries, 65 yards
Kent State	Receiving	Chrishon McCray	5 receptions, 52 yards

=== At Akron ===
Kent State Golden Flashes at Akron Zips – Game summary

Quarter	1	2	3	4	Total
Golden Flashes	6	14	7	0	27
Zips	7	3	0	21	31

at InfoCision Stadium • Akron, Ohio

- Date: November 1
- Game time: 7:30 p.m. EDT
- Game attendance: 8,113
- TV: ESPNU

Game information

First quarter

- (6:21) KENT – Tommy Ulatowski 5-yard run (Andrew Glass kick failed) (Drive: 4 plays, 51 yards, 2:14; Kent State 6-0)
- (1:48) AKR - Daniel George 14-yard pass from Jeff Undercuffler Jr. (Owen Wiley kick) (Drive: 8 plays, 72 yards, 4:26, Akron 7-6)

Second quarter

- (9:36) KENT – Crishon McCray 36-yard pass from Tommy Ulatowski (Andrew Glass kick) (Drive: 5 plays, 72 yards, 2:19; Kent State 13-7)
- (6:50) AKR - Owen Wiley 2-yard field goal (Drive: 7 plays, 57 yards, 2:39; Kent State 13-10)
- (0:38) KENT – Luke Floriea 19-yard pass from Tommy Ulatowski (Andrew Glass kick) (Drive: 13 plays, 72 yards, 6:04; Kent State 20-7)

Third quarter

- (0:38) KENT – Crishon McCray 27-yard pass from Tommy Ulatowski (Andrew Glass kick) (Drive: 3 plays, 69 yards, 1:25; Kent State 27-7)

Fourth quarter

- (9:12) AKR - Jasaiah Gathings 22-yard pass from Jeff Undercuffler Jr. (Owen Wiley kick) (Drive: 16 plays, 87 yards, 6:32, Kent State 27-17)
- (3:32) AKR - Lorenzo Lingard 37-yard run (Owen Wiley kick) (Drive: 6 plays, 74 yards, 1:29, Kent State 27-24)
- (0:26) AKR - JJeff Undercuffler Jr. 5-yard run (Owen Wiley kick) (Drive: 9 plays, 57 yards, 2:43, Akron 31-27)

Statistics	KENT	AKR
First downs	16	22
Total yards	346	393
Rushing yards	117	95
Passing yards	229	298
Turnovers	0	0
Time of possession	30:08	29:52

Team	Category	Player	Statistics
Kent State	Passing	Tommy Ulatowski	15/23, 229 yards, 3 TD
Kent State	Rushing	Jaylen Thomas	14 rushes, 36 yards
Kent State	Receiving	Crishon McCray	6 receptions, 161 yards, 2 TD
Akron	Passing	Jeff Undercuffler Jr.	23/39, 298 yards, 2 TD
Akron	Rushing	Lorenzo Lingard	22 rushes, 106 yards, TD
Akron	Receiving	Daniel George	9 receptions, 104 yards, TD

=== Bowling Green ===
Bowling Green Falcons at Kent State Golden Flashes – Game summary

Quarter	1	2	3	4	Total
Falcons	14	14	0	21	49
Golden Flashes	3	3	7	6	19

at Dix Stadium • Kent, Ohio

- Date: November 8
- Game time: 7:00 p.m. EST
- Game weather: Sunny, 53 °F (12 °C) • Wind: E 8 mph (13 km/h)
- Game attendance: 6,065
- Referee: Andrew Speciale
- TV: CBSSN

Game information

First quarter

- (08:58) KENT – Andrew Glass 48-yard field goal (Drive: 11 plays, 39 yards, 5:56; Kent State 3-0)
- (02:01) BGSU – Camden Orth 1-yard run (Alan Anaya kick) (Drive: 5 plays, 31 yards, 2:49; Bowling Green 7-3)
- (00:16) BGSU – Harold Fannin Jr. 47-yard pass from Connor Bazelak (Alan Anaya kick) (Drive: 1 play, 47 yards, :09; Bowling Green 14-3)

Second quarter

- (11:39) KENT – Andrew Glass 32-yard field goal (Drive: 7 plays, 55 yards, 3:30;Bowling Green 14-6)
- (05:18) BGSU – Ta'ron Keith 45-yard pass from Camden Orth (Alan Anaya kick) (Drive: 3 plays, 80 yards, 1:20;Bowling Green 21-6)
- (00:51) BGSU – Camden Orth 2-yard run (Alan Anaya kick) (Drive: 8 plays, 64 yards, 3:24; Bowling Green 28-6)

Third quarter

- (05:00) KENT – Hayden Junker 21-yard pass from Tommy Ulatowski (Andrew Glass kick) (Drive: 3 plays, 32 yards, :54; Bowling Green 28-13)

Fourth quarter

- (12:55) BGSU – Ta'ron Keith 2-yard run (Alan Anaya kick) (Drive: 12 plays, 75 yards, 7:05; Bowling Green 35-13)
- (07:36) KENT – Jaylen Thomaas 2-yard run (run failed) (Drive: 8 plays, 55 yards, 2:38; Bowling Green 35-19)
- (05:00) BGSU – Jaison Patterson 3-yard run (Alan Anaya kick) (Drive: 5 plays, 40 yards, 2:25; Bowling Green 42-19)
- (02:01) BGSU – Lucian Anderson III 1-yard run (Alan Anaya kick) (Drive: 5 plays, 15 yards, 1:17; Bowling Green 49-19)

Statistics	BGSU	KENT
First downs	18	20
Total yards	476	358
Rushing yards	190	74
Passing yards	286	284
Turnovers	1	2
Time of possession	30:29	29:31

Team	Category	Player	Statistics
Bowling Green	Passing	Connor Bazelak	13/19, 188 yards, TD, INT
Bowling Green	Rushing	Ta'ron Keith	9 rushes, 103 yards, TD
Bowling Green	Receiving	Ta'ron Keith	8 receptions, 130 yards, TD
Kent State	Passing	Tommy Ulatowski	23/40, 284 yards, 2 TD, INT
Kent State	Rushing	Jaylen Thomas	18 rushes, 73 yards, TD
Kent State	Receiving	Luke Floriea	9 receptions, 95 yards
