= 2023 Ball State Cardinals football team =

American college football season

2023 Ball State Cardinals football
- Conference: Mid-American Conference
- West Division
- Record: 4–8 (3–5 MAC)
- Head coach: Mike Neu (8th season)
- Offensive coordinator: Kevin Lynch (4th season)
- Co-offensive coordinator: Jared Elliott (1st season)
- Offensive scheme: Multiple
- Defensive coordinator: Tyler Stockton (5th season)
- Base defense: 3–4
- Home stadium: Scheumann Stadium

2023 Mid-American Conference football standings
| | Conf. | | | Overall |
| Team | W | | L | W | | L |
|---|---|---|---|---|---|---|
East Division
| Miami (OH) xy$ | 7 | – | 1 | 11 | – | 3 |
| Ohio | 6 | – | 2 | 10 | – | 3 |
| Bowling Green | 5 | – | 3 | 7 | – | 6 |
| Buffalo | 3 | – | 5 | 3 | – | 9 |
| Akron | 1 | – | 7 | 2 | – | 10 |
| Kent State | 0 | – | 8 | 1 | – | 11 |
West Division
| Toledo xy | 8 | – | 0 | 11 | – | 3 |
| Northern Illinois | 5 | – | 3 | 7 | – | 6 |
| Eastern Michigan | 4 | – | 4 | 6 | – | 7 |
| Central Michigan | 3 | – | 5 | 5 | – | 7 |
| Ball State | 3 | – | 5 | 4 | – | 8 |
| Western Michigan | 3 | – | 5 | 4 | – | 8 |
Championship: Miami (OH) 23, Toledo 14
$ – Conference champion; x – Division champion/co-champions; y – Championship game participant

The 2023 Ball State Cardinals football team represented Ball State University during the 2023 NCAA Division I FBS football season. The Cardinals were led by eighth-year head coach Mike Neu and played their home games at Scheumann Stadium in Muncie, Indiana. They competed as members of the West Division of the Mid-American Conference. They finished the season 4–8 and 3–5 in conference play

The Ball State Cardinals football team drew an average home attendance of 10,771 in 2023.

== Schedule ==
| Date | Time | Opponent | Site | TV | Result | Attendance |
|---|---|---|---|---|---|---|
| September 2 | 12:00 p.m. | at Kentucky* | Kroger Field; Lexington, KY | SECN | L 14–44 | 58,286 |
| September 9 | 12:00 p.m. | at No. 1 Georgia* | Sanford Stadium; Athens, GA | SECN | L 3–45 | 92,746 |
| September 16 | 2:00 p.m. | Indiana State* | Scheumann Stadium; Muncie, IN (Blue Key Victory Bell) | ESPN+ | W 45–7 | 15,054 |
| September 23 | 2:00 p.m. | Georgia Southern* | Scheumann Stadium; Muncie, IN | ESPN+ | L 3–40 | 10,118 |
| September 30 | 3:30 p.m. | at Western Michigan | Waldo Stadium; Kalamazoo, MI | ESPN+ | L 24–42 | 21,880 |
| October 7 | 3:30 p.m. | at Eastern Michigan | Rynearson Stadium; Ypsilanti, MI | ESPN+ | L 10–24 | 18,696 |
| October 14 | 2:00 p.m. | Toledo | Scheumann Stadium; Muncie, IN | ESPN+ | L 6–13 | 7,680 |
| October 21 | 3:30 p.m. | Central Michigan^{†} | Scheumann Stadium; Muncie, IN | ESPN+ | W 24–17 | 15,171 |
| November 1 | 7:30 p.m. | at Bowling Green | Doyt Perry Stadium; Bowling Green, OH | ESPN2 | L 21–24 | 6,091 |
| November 7 | 7:00 p.m. | at Northern Illinois | Huskie Stadium; DeKalb, IL (Bronze Stalk Trophy) | CBSSN | W 20–17 | 6,282 |
| November 18 | 2:00 p.m. | Kent State | Scheumann Stadium; Muncie, IN | ESPN+ | W 34–3 | 8,554 |
| November 25 | 12:00 p.m. | Miami (OH) | Scheumann Stadium; Muncie, IN | CBSSN | L 15–17 | 8,054 |
*Non-conference game; ^{†}Homecoming; Rankings from AP Poll released prior to the game; All times are in Eastern time

== Preseason ==
=== Preseason coaches poll ===
On July 20, the MAC announced the preseason coaches poll. Ball State was picked to finish fifth in the West Division.

== Game summaries ==
=== at Kentucky ===
Game One – Ball State Cardinals (0–0) at Kentucky Wildcats (0–0) – Game summary

| Quarter | 1 | 2 | 3 | 4 | Total |
|---|---|---|---|---|---|
| Ball State | 7 | 0 | 7 | 0 | 14 |
| Kentucky | 3 | 20 | 14 | 7 | 44 |

at Kroger Field • Lexington, KY

- Date: Saturday, September 2, 2023
- Game time: 12:00 p.m. EST
- Game weather: -
- Game attendance: 58,286
- TV: SEC Network

Game information

First quarter

- (13:17) UK – Alex Raynor 41-yard field goal (Drive: 5 plays, 51 yards, 1:43; Kentucky 3–0)
- (1:35) BALL – Layne Hatcher 2-yard run (Jackson Courville kick) (Drive: 13 plays, 73 yards, 7:05; Ball State 7–3)

Second quarter

- (11:31) UK – Ray Davis 2-yard run (Alex Raynor kick) (Drive: 11 plays, 70 yards, 4:58; Kentucky 10–7)
- (6:58) UK – Jalen Geiger 0-yard fumble return (Alex Raynor kick) (Kentucky 17–7)
- (1:08) UK – Alex Raynor 46-yard field goal (Drive: 4 plays, 2 yards, 0:10; Kentucky 20–7)
- (0:00) UK – Alex Raynor 46-yard field goal (Drive: 4 plays, 26 yards, 0:31; Kentucky 23–7)

Third quarter

- (6:43) UK – Dane Key 5-yard pass from Devin Leary (Alex Raynor kick) (Drive: 7 plays, 89 yards, 2:37; Kentucky 30–7)
- (0:42) BALL – Ty Robinson 5-yard pass from Kadin Semonza (Jackson Courville kick) (Drive: 10 plays, 75 yards, 6:01; Kentucky 30–14)
- (0:28) UK – Barion Brown 99-yard kickoff return (Alex Raynor kick) (Kentucky 37–14)

Fourth quarter

- (0:06) UK – Ray Davis 30 yard run (Alex Raynor kick) (Drive: 6 plays, 66 yards, 3:16; Kentucky 44–14)

| Statistics | BALL | UK |
|---|---|---|
| First downs | 18 | 17 |
| Total yards | 71–295 | 51–354 |
| Rushing yards | 41–72 | 20–113 |
| Passing yards | 223 | 241 |
| Passing: Comp–Att–Int | 22–30–0 | 18–31–1 |
| Time of possession | 38:16 | 21:44 |

| Team | Category | Player | Statistics |
|---|---|---|---|
| Ball State | Passing | Kadin Semonza | 15/21, 165 yards, TD |
| Ball State | Rushing | Marquez Cooper | 15 carries, 33 yards |
| Ball State | Receiving | Ty Robinson | 5 receptions, 90 yards, TD |
| Kentucky | Passing | Devin Leary | 18/31, 241 yards, TD, INT |
| Kentucky | Rushing | Ray Davis | 14 carries, 112 yards, 2 TD |
| Kentucky | Receiving | Dane Key | 5 receptions, 96 yards, TD |

=== at No. 1 Georgia ===
Game Two – Ball State Cardinals (0–1) at No. 1 Georgia Bulldogs (1–0) – Game summary

| Quarter | 1 | 2 | 3 | 4 | Total |
|---|---|---|---|---|---|
| Ball State | 0 | 0 | 0 | 3 | 3 |
| No. 1 Georgia | 0 | 31 | 14 | 0 | 45 |

at Sanford Stadium • Athens, Georgia

- Date: Saturday, September 9, 2023
- Game time: 12:00 p.m. EST
- Game weather: -
- Game attendance: 92,756
- Referee: Jason McArthur
- TV announcers (SEC Network): Taylor Zarzour (play-by-play), Matt Stinchcomb (color) and Alyssa Lang (sideline)

Game information

First quarter

no scoring

Second quarter

- (14:32) UGA – Mekhi Mews 69-yard punt return (Peyton Woodring kick) (Georgia 7–0)
- (10:16) UGA – Marcus Rosemy-Jacksaint 7-yard pass from Carson Beck (Peyton Woodring kick) (Drive: 6 plays, 78 yards, 2:25; Georgia 14–0)
- (8:45) UGA – Dillon Bell 21-yard run (Peyton Woodring kick) (Drive: 2 plays, 30 yards, 0:51; Georgia 21–0)
- (1:49) UGA – Peyton Woodring 35-yard field goal (Drive: 12 plays, 42 yards, 5:28; Georgia 24–0)
- (0:37) UGA – Kendall Milton 1-yard run (Peyton Woodring kick) (Drive: 4 plays, 20 yards, 1:04; Georgia 31–0)

Third quarter

- (6:27) UGA – Cash Jones 27-yard pass from Carson Beck (Peyton Woodring kick) (Drive: 8 plays, 80 yards, 4:14; Georgia 38-0)
- (0:46) UGA – Roderick Robinson II 12-yard run (Peyton Woodring kick) (Drive: 3 plays, 67 yards, 1:21; Georgia 45–0)

Fourth quarter

- (9:05) BALL – Jackson Courville 27-yard field goal (Drive: 15 plays, 55 yards, 6:41; Georgia 45–3)

| Statistics | BALL | UGA |
|---|---|---|
| First downs | 13 | 22 |
| Total yards | 65–224 | 61–386 |
| Rushing yards | 28–77 | 28–99 |
| Passing yards | 147 | 287 |
| Passing: Comp–Att–Int | 18–37–3 | 24–33–1 |
| Time of possession | 31:28 | 28:32 |

| Team | Category | Player | Statistics |
|---|---|---|---|
| Ball State | Passing | Layne Hatcher | 10/16, 82 yards |
| Ball State | Rushing | Charlie Spegal | 4 carries, 32 yards |
| Ball State | Receiving | Ahmad Edwards | 4 receptions, 47 yards |
| Georgia | Passing | Carson Beck | 23/30, 283 yards, 2 TD, INT |
| Georgia | Rushing | Roderick Robinson II | 6 carries, 38 yards, TD |
| Georgia | Receiving | Arian Smith | 2 receptions, 50 yards |

=== Indiana State ===
Game Three – Indiana State Sycamores (0–2) at Ball State Cardinals (0–2) – Game summary

| Quarter | 1 | 2 | 3 | 4 | Total |
|---|---|---|---|---|---|
| Indiana State | 0 | 0 | 7 | 0 | 7 |
| Ball State | 0 | 10 | 7 | 28 | 45 |

at Scheumann Stadium • Muncie, IN

- Date: Saturday, September 16, 2023
- Game time: 2:00 p.m. EST
- Game weather: -
- Game attendance: 15,054
- TV: ESPN+

Game information

First quarter

No scoring

Second quarter

- (12:13) BALL – Rico Barfield 16-yard pass from Kadin Semonza (Jackson Courville kick) (Drive: 11 plays, 73 yards, 5:20; Ball State 7–0)
- (1:34) BALL – Jackson Courville 23-yard field goal (Drive: 9 plays, 69 yards, 4:24; Ball State 10–0)

Third quarter

- (6:45) BALL – Rico Barfield 24-yard run (Jackson Courville kick) (Drive: 3 plays, 55 yards, 1:24; Ball State 17–0)
- (5:48) ISU – Dakota Caton 49-yard pass from Elijah Owens (Stephen Ruiz kick) (Drive: 2 plays, 61 yards, 0:50: Ball State 17–7)

Fourth quarter

- (13:12) BALL – Marquez Cooper 11-yard run (Jackson Courville kick) (Drive:13 plays, 75 yards, 7:29; Ball State 24–7)
- (11:32) BALL – Tanner Koziol 8-yard pass from Kadin Semonza (Jackson Courville kick) (Drive: 2 plays, 23 yards, 0:54: Ball State 31–7)
- (9:20) BALL – Keionte Newson 66-yard fumble return (Jackson Courville kick) (Ball State 38–7)
- (3:13) BALL – Charlie Spegal 1-yard run (Jackson Courville kick) (Drive: 5 plays, 35 yards, 2:49; Ball State 45–7)

| Statistics | ISU | BALL |
|---|---|---|
| First downs | 12 | 26 |
| Total yards | 53–261 | 66–425 |
| Rushing yards | 32–104 | 42–288 |
| Passing yards | 157 | 137 |
| Passing: Comp–Att–Int | 9–21–1 | 18–24–0 |
| Time of possession | 26:59 | 33:01 |

| Team | Category | Player | Statistics |
|---|---|---|---|
| Indiana State | Passing | Elijah Owens | 9/21, 157 yards, TD, INT |
| Indiana State | Rushing | Tee Hodge | 9 carries, 46 yards |
| Indiana State | Receiving | Harry Van Dyne | 3 receptions, 80 yards |
| Ball State | Passing | Kadin Semonza | 17/22, 137 yards, 2 TD |
| Ball State | Rushing | Marquez Cooper | 22 carries, 177 yards, TD |
| Ball State | Receiving | Tanner Koziol | 7 receptions, 60 yards, TD |

=== Georgia Southern ===
Game Four – Georgia Southern Eagles (2–1) at Ball State Cardinals (1–2) – Game summary

| Quarter | 1 | 2 | 3 | 4 | Total |
|---|---|---|---|---|---|
| Georgia Southern | 14 | 9 | 10 | 7 | 40 |
| Ball State | 0 | 0 | 0 | 3 | 3 |

at Scheumann Stadium • Muncie, IN

- Date: Saturday, September 23, 2023
- Game time: 2:00 p.m. EST
- Game weather: -
- Game attendance: 10,118
- TV: ESPN+

Game information

First quarter

- (11:51) GASO – Evan Lester Jr. 1-yard pass from Davis Brin (Michael Lantz kick) (Drive: 9 plays, 52 yards, 3:04; Georgia Southern 7–0)
- (8:47) GASO – Keaton Upshaw 9-yard pass from Davis Brin (Michael Lantz kick) (Drive: 4 plays, 63 yards, 1:30; Georgia Southern 14–0)

Second quarter

- (12:37) GASO – Michael Lantz 41-yard field goal (Drive: 6 plays, 16 yards, 1:37; Georgia Southern 17–0)
- (6:36) GASO – Michael Lantz 26-yard field goal (Drive: 9 plays, 55 yards, 3:18; Georgia Southern 20–0)
- (0:00) GASO – Michael Lantz 37-yard field goal (Drive: 8 plays, 57 yards, 0:43; Georgia Southern 23–0)

Third quarter

- (8:47) GASO – Khaleb Hood 21-yard pass from Davis Brin (Michael Lantz kick) (Drive: 4 plays, 56 yards, 1:10; Georgia Southern 30–0)
- (1:03) GASO – Michael Lantz 35-yard field goal (Drive: 8 plays, 28 yards, 2:11; Georgia Southern 33–0)

Fourth quarter

- (13:42) GASO – Anthony Queeley 8-yard pass from Davis Brin (Michael Lantz kick) (Drive: 4 plays, 55 yards, 1:06; Georgia Southern 40–0)
- (7:15) BALL – Jackson Courville 23-yard field goal (Drive: 12 plays, 69 yards, 6:27; Georgia Southern 40–3)

| Statistics | GASO | BALL |
|---|---|---|
| First downs | 25 | 10 |
| Total yards | 77–530 | 55–197 |
| Rushing yards | 27–167 | 28–37 |
| Passing yards | 363 | 160 |
| Passing: Comp–Att–Int | 36–50–0 | 14–29–2 |
| Time of possession | 30:41 | 29:19 |

| Team | Category | Player | Statistics |
|---|---|---|---|
| Georgia Southern | Passing | Davis Brin | 34/46, 344 yards, 4 TD |
| Georgia Southern | Rushing | OJ Arnold | 9 carries, 90 yards |
| Georgia Southern | Receiving | Khaleb Hood | 7 receptions, 107 yards, TD |
| Ball State | Passing | Kadin Semonza | 11/23, 123 yards, 2 INT |
| Ball State | Rushing | Marquez Cooper | 9 carries, 16 yards |
| Ball State | Receiving | Rico Barfield | 2 receptions, 50 yards |

=== at Western Michigan ===
Game Five – Ball State Cardinals (1–3) at Western Michigan Broncos (1–3) – Game summary

| Quarter | 1 | 2 | 3 | 4 | Total |
|---|---|---|---|---|---|
| Ball State | 3 | 7 | 7 | 7 | 24 |
| Western Michigan | 7 | 21 | 7 | 7 | 42 |

at Waldo Stadium • Kalamazoo, MI

- Date: Saturday, September 30, 2023
- Game time: 3:30 p.m. EST
- Game weather: -
- Game attendance: 21,880
- TV: ESPN+

Game information

First quarter

- (8:37) BALL – Jackson Courville 27-yard field goal (Drive: 10 plays, 70 yards, 4:25; Ball State 3–0)
- (5:06) WMU – Anthony Sambucci 18-yard pass from Treyson Bourguet (Palmer Domschke kick) (Drive: 7 plays, 75 yards, 3:31; Western Michigan 7–3)

Second quarter

- (13:06) WMU – Zahir Abdus-Salaam 1-yard run (Palmer Domschke kick) (Drive: 10 plays, 92 yards, 3:57; Western Michigan 14–3)
- (7:50) WMU – Jalen Buckley 12-yard run (Palmer Domschke kick) (Drive: 7 plays, 43 yards, 2:29; Western Michigan 21–3)
- (5:04) BALL – Maximus Webster 2-yard pass from Layne Hatcher (Jackson Courville kick) (Drive: 6 plays, 73 yards, 2:45; Western Michigan 21–10)
- (0:01) WMU – Anthony Sambucci 2-yard pass from Treyson Bourguet (Palmer Domschke kick) (Drive: 10 plays, 59 yards, 1:27; Western Michigan 28–10)

Third quarter

- (11:52) BALL – Qian Magwood 32-yard pass from Layne Hatcher (Jackson Courville kick) (Drive: 6 plays, 75 yards, 3:08; Western Michigan 28–17)
- (10:14) WMU – Anthony Sambucci 31-yard pass from Treyson Bourguet (Palmer Domschke kick) (Drive: 5 plays, 75 yards, 1:38; Western Michigan 35–17)

Fourth quarter

- (14:15) BALL – Ahmad Edwards 57-yard pass from Layne Hatcher (Jackson Courville kick) (Drive: 4 plays, 69 yards, 1:38; Western Michigan 35–24)
- (8:53) WMU – Zahir Abdus-Salaam 2-yard run (Palmer Domschke kick) (Drive: 6 plays, 85 yards, 3:22; Western Michigan 42–24)

| Statistics | BALL | WMU |
|---|---|---|
| First downs | 19 | 26 |
| Total yards | 63–364 | 75–461 |
| Rushing yards | 26–48 | 36–133 |
| Passing yards | 316 | 328 |
| Passing: Comp–Att–Int | 26–37–0 | 24–39–0 |
| Time of possession | 29:37 | 30:23 |

| Team | Category | Player | Statistics |
|---|---|---|---|
| Ball State | Passing | Layne Hatcher | 26/37, 316 yards, 3 TD |
| Ball State | Rushing | Marquez Cooper | 15 carries, 82 yards |
| Ball State | Receiving | Qian Magwood | 9 receptions, 110 yards, TD |
| Western Michigan | Passing | Treyson Bourguet | 24/39, 328 yards, 3 TD |
| Western Michigan | Rushing | Zahir Abdus-Salaam | 8 carries, 53 yards, 2 TD |
| Western Michigan | Receiving | Anthony Sambucci | 5 receptions, 73 yards, 3 TD |

=== at Bowling Green ===
Game Nine – Ball State Cardinals (2–6) at Bowling Green Falcons (4–4) – Game summary

| Quarter | 1 | 2 | 3 | 4 | Total |
|---|---|---|---|---|---|
| Ball State | 0 | 7 | 7 | 7 | 21 |
| Bowling Green | 7 | 7 | 0 | 10 | 24 |

at Doyt Perry Stadium • Bowling Green, OH

- Date: Wednesday, November 1, 2023
- Game time: 7:00 p.m. EDT
- Game weather: Cloudy, 37 °F (3 °C) • Wind: SW 7 mph (11 km/h)
- Game attendance: 6,091
- Referee: Matt Packowski
- TV announcers (ESPN2): Mike Corey, Rocky Boiman

Game information

First quarter

- (07:43) BGSU – Harold Fannin Jr. 23-yard pass from Connor Bazelak (Alan Anaya kick) (Drive: 4 plays, 31 yards, 1:20; Bowling Green 7-0)

Second quarter

- (14:06) BSU – Kiael Kelly 6-yard run (Jackson Courville kick) (Drive: 17 plays, 74 yards, 8:27; Tied 7-7)
- (04:40) BGSU – Terion Stewart 54-yard run (Alan Anaya kick) (Drive: 2 plays, 54 yards, :20; Bowling Green 14-7)

Third quarter

- (05:04) BSU – Marquez Cooper 5-yard run (Jackson Courville kick) (Drive: 13 plays, 62 yards, 8:03; Tied 14-14)

Fourth quarter

- (13:20) BGSU – Ta'ron Keith 10-yard pass from Connor Bazelak (Alan Anaya kick) (Drive:12 plays, 75 yards, 5:43; Bowling Green 21-14)
- (09:07) BSU – Kiael Kelly 44-yard run (Jackson Courville kick) (Drive: 7 plays, 75 yards, 4:13; Tied 21-21)
- (03:14) BGSU – Alan Anaya 22-yard field goal (Drive: 11 plays, 39 yards, 5:43; Bowling Green 24-21)

| Statistics | Ball State | Bowling Green |
|---|---|---|
| First downs | 16 | 13 |
| Plays–yards | 283 | 281 |
| Rushes–yards | 49–217-3 | 34–104 |
| Passing yards | 66 | 177 |
| Passing: comp–att–int | 9–19–0 | 15-23-0 |
| Turnovers | | |
| Time of possession | 33:34 | 26:26 |

| Team | Category | Player | Statistics |
|---|---|---|---|
| Ball State | Passing | Kiael Kelly | 9/19, 66 yards |
| Ball State | Rushing | Marquez Cooper/Kiael Kelly | 25 carries, 90 yards, 1 TD/ 25 carries, 90 yards, 2 TDS |
| Ball State | Receiving | Ahmad Edwards | 3 receptions, 25 yards |
| Bowling Green | Passing | Connor Bazelak | 13/21, 128 yards, 2 TDS |
| Bowling Green | Rushing | Terion Stewart | 15 carries, 92 yards, 1 TD |
| Bowling Green | Receiving | Harold Fannin Jr. | 5 receptions, 92 yards, 1 TD |
