= Kenni Burns =

American football player and coach (born 1983)

Biographical details
- Born: November 24, 1983 (age 42); Springfield, Illinois, U.S.
- Education: Indiana University Bloomington

Playing career
- 2003–2006: Indiana
- Position: Running back

Coaching career (HC unless noted)
- 2007: Millersville (RB)
- 2008–2009: Southern Illinois (TE)
- 2010–2013: North Dakota State (WR)
- 2014-2015: Wyoming (WR)
- 2016: Western Michigan (RB)
- 2017–2018: Minnesota (RB)
- 2019–2022: Minnesota (AHC/RB)
- 2023–2024: Kent State

Head coaching record
- Overall: 1–23

Kenni Burns (born November 24, 1983) is an American college football coach and former running back. He previously served as the head coach at Kent State University from 2023 to 2024. Burns played college football at Indiana University Bloomington from 2003 to 2006.

== Playing career ==
Burns was a three-year letter winner at Indiana. As a student there he played running back from 2003 to 2006.

== Coaching career ==
=== Minnesota ===
Burns followed P. J. Fleck from Western Michigan to Minnesota 2017, as the running back coach. In 2019, he was granted the additional title as assistant head coach. During his tenure, Burns coached Rodney Smith and All-American back Mohamed Ibrahim.

=== Kent State ===
On December 14, 2022, Burns was named the head coach for the Kent State Golden Flashes. His initial contract was for five years, starting at $525,000/year with minor increases in 2025 and 2027, amounting to $2.7 million in total. Kent State extended Burns through 2028 following the 2023 season.

Kent State placed Burns on administrative leave on March 27, 2025. At the time, his overall record was 1–23. Offensive coordinator Mark Carney took over day-to-day operations. Kent State fired Burns on April 11 and confirmed Carney as the interim head coach.

== Personal life ==
Burns is from Springfield, Illinois. He graduated from Sacred Heart-Griffin High School in 2003 and attended Indiana University Bloomington where he graduated with a degree in general studies in 2006.

Burns and his wife, Ciara, have two children.

== Head coaching record ==
Year	Team	Overall	Conference	Standing	Bowl/playoffs
Kent State Golden Flashes (Mid-American Conference) (2023–2024)
2023	Kent State	1–11	0–8	6th (East)	
2024	Kent State	0–12	0–8	12th	
Kent State:		1–23	0–16		
Total:		1–23			
