= 2023 Akron Zips football team =

American college football season

2023 Akron Zips football
- Conference: Mid-American Conference
- East Division
- Record: 2–10 (1–7 MAC)
- Head coach: Joe Moorhead (2nd season)
- Offensive coordinator: Billy Fessler (1st season)
- Offensive scheme: Multiple up-tempo
- Defensive coordinator: Tim Tibesar (2nd season)
- Base defense: Multiple 4–2–5
- Home stadium: InfoCision Stadium–Summa Field

2023 Mid-American Conference football standings
	Conf.			Overall
Team	W		L	W		L
East Division
Miami (OH) xy$	7	–	1	11	–	3
Ohio	6	–	2	10	–	3
Bowling Green	5	–	3	7	–	6
Buffalo	3	–	5	3	–	9
Akron	1	–	7	2	–	10
Kent State	0	–	8	1	–	11
West Division
Toledo xy	8	–	0	11	–	3
Northern Illinois	5	–	3	7	–	6
Eastern Michigan	4	–	4	6	–	7
Central Michigan	3	–	5	5	–	7
Ball State	3	–	5	4	–	8
Western Michigan	3	–	5	4	–	8
Championship: Miami (OH) 23, Toledo 14
$ – Conference champion; x – Division champion/co-champions; y – Championship game participant

The 2023 Akron Zips football team represented the University of Akron as a member of the East Division of the Mid-American Conference (MAC) during the 2023 NCAA Division I FBS football season. Led by second-year head coach Joe Moorhead, the Zips played home games at InfoCision Stadium in Akron, Ohio. They finished the season 2–10 and 1–7 in conference play The Akron Zips football team drew an average home attendance of 7,237 in 2023.

== Preseason ==
=== Preseason polls ===
==== Coaches Poll ====
On July 20, the MAC announced the preseason coaches poll. Akron was picked to finish fifth in the East.

== Schedule ==
Date	Time	Opponent	Site	TV	Result	Attendance
September 2	2:00 p.m.	at Temple*	Lincoln Financial Field; Philadelphia, PA	ESPN+	L 21–24	12,456
September 9	6:00 p.m.	Morgan State*	InfoCision Stadium–Summa Field; Akron, OH	ESPN+	W 24–21	8,213
September 16	7:00 p.m.	at Kentucky*	Kroger Field; Lexington, KY	ESPNU	L 3–35	59,456
September 23	7:30 p.m.	at Indiana*	Memorial Stadium; Bloomington, IN	BTN	L 27–29 ^{4OT}	44,968
September 30	12:00 p.m.	Buffalo	InfoCision Stadium–Summa Field; Akron, OH	ESPN+	L 10–13 ^{OT}	5,490
October 7	3:30 p.m.	Northern Illinois^{†}	InfoCision Stadium–Summa Field; Akron, OH	ESPN+	L 14–55	8,216
October 14	3:30 p.m.	at Central Michigan	Kelly/Shorts Stadium; Mount Pleasant, MI	ESPN+	L 10–17	17,886
October 21	2:00 p.m.	at Bowling Green	Doyt Perry Stadium; Bowling Green, OH	ESPN+	L 14–41	10,068
November 1	7:30 p.m.	Kent State	InfoCision Stadium–Summa Field; Akron, OH (Wagon Wheel)	ESPNU	W 31–27	8,113
November 8	7:30 p.m.	at Miami (OH)	Yager Stadium; Oxford, OH	ESPNU	L 0–19	7,233
November 14	7:00 p.m.	at Eastern Michigan	Rynearson Stadium; Ypsilanti, MI	CBSSN	L 27–30 ^{2OT}	13,664
November 24	12:00 p.m.	Ohio	InfoCision Stadium–Summa Field; Akron, OH	CBSSN	L 14–25	6,152
*Non-conference game; ^{†}Homecoming; Rankings from AP Poll released prior to the game; All times are in Eastern time

== Game summaries ==
=== at Kentucky ===
Game Three – Akron Zips (1–1) at Kentucky Wildcats (2–0) – Game summary

Quarter	1	2	3	4	Total
Akron	0	0	3	0	3
Kentucky	7	7	7	14	35

at Kroger Field • Lexington, KY

- Date: Saturday, September 16, 2023
- Game time: 7:30 p.m. EST
- Game weather: -
- Game attendance: 59,456
- Referee: Lee Hedrick
- TV announcers (ESPNU): Courtney Lyle (play-by-play), Hutson Mason (analyst)

Game information

First quarter

- (10:34) UK – Josh Kattus 6-yard pass from Devin Leary (Alex Raynor kick) (Drive: 7 plays, 75 yards, 4:26; Kentucky 7-0)

Second quarter

- (0:08) UK – Tayvion Robinson 22-yard pass from Devin Leary (Alex Raynor kick) (Drive: 10 plays, 70 yards, 5:31; Kentucky 14-0)

Third quarter

- (3:27) AKR – Noah Perez 36-yard field goal (Drive: 9 plays, 27 yards, 5:33; Kentucky 14-3)
- (1:38) UK – Ray Davis 58-yard pass from Devin Leary (Alex Raynor kick) (Drive: 4 plays, 81 yards, 1:14; Kentucky 21-3)

Fourth quarter

- (13:47) UK – Ray Davis 55-yard run (Alex Raynor kick) (Drive: 3 plays, 73 yards, 1:08; Kentucky 28-3)
- (3:04) UK – Demie Sumo-Karngbaye 4-yard run (Alex Raynor kick) (Drive: 4 plays, 62 yards, 2:03; Kentucky 35-3)

Statistics	AKR	UK
First downs	16	18
Total yards	66–239	48–450
Rushing yards	25–49	22–135
Passing yards	190	315
Passing: Comp–Att–Int	29–41–0	16–26–1
Time of possession	34:47	25:13

Team	Category	Player	Statistics
Akron	Passing	DJ Irons	23/34, 130 yards
Akron	Rushing	Lorenzo Lingard	7 carries, 30 yards
Akron	Receiving	Jasaiah Gathings	5 receptions, 43 yards
Kentucky	Passing	Devin Leary	16/25, 315 yards, 3 TD, INT
Kentucky	Rushing	Ray Davis	7 carries, 72 yards, TD
Kentucky	Receiving	Ray Davis	3 receptions, 97 yards, TD

=== vs Buffalo ===
Game Five – Buffalo Bulls (0–4) vs. Akron Zips (1–3) – Game summary

Quarter	1	2	3	4	OT	Total
Bulls	0	7	3	0	3	13
Zips	7	3	0	0	0	10

at InfoCision Stadium–Summa Field • Akron, Ohio

- Date: September 30, 2023
- Game time: Noon
- Game weather: 71 °F (22 °C); Sunny; Wind at SW5 MPH
- Game attendance: 5,490
- Referee: Andrew Speciale
- TV announcers (ESPN+): Connor Onion (play-by-play), Adam Breneman (analyst) and Dannie Rogers (sideline)

Game information

First quarter

- AKR – (0:38) Drake Anderson 1-yard pass from DJ Irons, Owen Wiley kick (Drive: 12 plays, 97 yards, 5:42; Akron 7–0)

Second quarter

- UB – (6:21) Boobie Curry 9-yard pass from Cole Snyder, Alex McNulty kick (Drive: 16 plays, 79 yards, 9:09; Tied 7–7)
- AKR – (0:21) Owen Wiley 38-yard field goal (Drive: 12 plays, 55 yards, 6:00; Akron 10–7)

Third quarter

- UB – (3:30) Alex McNulty 43-yard field goal (Drive: 16 plays, 46 yards, 7:41; Tied 10–10)

Fourth quarter
Overtime

- UB – Alex McNulty 42-yard field goal (Drive: 4 plays, 1 yard; Buffalo 13–10)

Statistics	UB	AKR
First downs	16	15
Plays–yards	68–248	52–258
Rushes–yards	34–106	25–122
Passing yards	142	136
Passing: comp–att–int	20–34–0	19–27–0
Turnovers		
Time of possession	33:22	26:38

Team	Category	Player	Statistics
Buffalo	Passing	Cole Snyder	19/34, 142 yards, TD
Buffalo	Rushing	Ron Cook	17 carries, 62 yards
Buffalo	Receiving	Chance Morrow	2 receptions, 45 yards
Akron	Passing	DJ Irons	19/26, 136 yards, TD
Akron	Rushing	DJ Irons	16 carries, 100 yards
Akron	Receiving	Myles Walker	4 receptions, 40 yards

=== at Bowling Green ===
Game Eight – Akron Zips (1–6) at Bowling Green Falcons (3–4) – Game summary

Quarter	1	2	3	4	Total
Akron	7	0	0	7	14
Bowling Green	3	10	21	7	41

at Doyt Perry Stadium • Bowling Green, OH

- Date: Saturday, October 21, 2023
- Game time: 2:00 p.m. EDT
- Game weather: Sunny, 52 °F (11 °C) • Wind: W 7 mph (11 km/h)
- Game attendance: 10,068
- Referee: Jeremy Valentine
- TV announcers (ESPN+): Michael Reghi, Marcus Ray

Game information

First quarter

- (09:58) BGSU – Alan Anaya 36-yard field goal (Drive: 11 plays, 52 yards, 4:56; Bowling Green 3-0)
- (01:11) AKR – Lorenzo Lingard 13-yard run (Noah Perez kick) (Drive: 7 plays, 72 yards, 3:40; Akron 7-3)

Second quarter

- (12:18) BGSU – Terion Stewart 3-yard run (Alan Anaya kick) (Drive: 1 play, 3 yards, :05; Bowling Green 10-7)
- (00:00) BGSU – Alan Anaya 33-yard field goal (Drive: 2 plays, 0 yards, :10; Bowling Green 13-7)

Third quarter

- (05:02) BGSU – Terion Stewart 16-yard run (Alan Anaya kick) (Drive: 10 plays, 88 yards, 5:34; Bowling Green 20-7)
- (03:20) BGSU – Terion Stewart 2-yard run (Alan Anaya kick) (Drive: 3 plays, 9 yards, 1:32; Bowling Green 27-7)
- (00:28) BGSU – Harold Fannin Jr. 8-yard pass from Connor Bazelak (Alan Anaya kick) (Drive: 3 plays,36 yards, 1:01; Bowling Green 34-7)

Fourth quarter

- (07:58) BGSU – Abdul-Fatai Ibrahim 8-yard pass from Camden Orth (Alan Anaya kick) (Drive: 7 plays,35 yards, 5:04; Bowling Green 41-7)
- (03:02) AKR – Drake Anderson 4-yard run (Noah Perez kick) (Drive: 11 plays,75 yards, 4:56; Bowling Green 41-14)

Statistics	Akron	Bowling Green
First downs	18	15
Plays–yards	279	297
Rushes–yards	28–45	42–214
Passing yards	234	83
Passing: comp–att–int	22–39–2	8-14-0
Turnovers		
Time of possession	29:56	30:04

Team	Category	Player	Statistics
Akron	Passing	Jeff Undercuffler	22/39, 234 yards, 2 INTS
Akron	Rushing	Lorenzo Lingard	12 carries, 56 yards, 1 TD
Akron	Receiving	Daniel George	7 receptions, 74 yards
Bowling Green	Passing	Connor Bazelak	6/11, 69 yards, 1 TD
Bowling Green	Rushing	Terion Stewart	19 carries, 131 yards, 3 TDS
Bowling Green	Receiving	Harold Fannin Jr.	2 receptions, 34 yards, 1 TD

=== vs Kent State ===
Game Nine – Akron Zips (1–7) vs Kent State Golden Flashes (1–7) – Game summary

Quarter	1	2	3	4	Total
Kent State	6	14	7	0	27
Akron	7	3	0	21	31

at InfoCision Stadium • Akron, OH

- Date: Wednesday, November 1, 2023
- Game time: 7:30 p.m. EST
- Game attendance: 8,113
- Referee: -
- TV announcers (ESPNU): -

Game information

First quarter

- (6:21) KENT – Tommy Ulatowski 5-yard run (Andrew Glass kick failed) (Drive: 4 plays, 51 yards, 2:14; Kent State 6-0)
- (1:48) AKR - Daniel George 14-yard pass from Jeff Undercuffler Jr. (Owen Wiley kick) (Drive: 8 plays, 72 yards, 4:26, Akron 7-6)

Second quarter

- (9:36) KENT – Crishon McCray 36-yard pass from Tommy Ulatowski (Andrew Glass kick) (Drive: 5 plays, 72 yards, 2:19; Kent State 13-7)
- (6:50) AKR - Owen Wiley 2-yard field goal (Drive: 7 plays, 57 yards, 2:39; Kent State 13-10)
- (0:38) KENT – Luke Floriea 19-yard pass from Tommy Ulatowski (Andrew Glass kick) (Drive: 13 plays, 72 yards, 6:04; Kent State 20-7)

Third quarter

- (0:38) KENT – Crishon McCray 27-yard pass from Tommy Ulatowski (Andrew Glass kick) (Drive: 3 plays, 69 yards, 1:25; Kent State 27-7)

Fourth quarter

- (9:12) AKR - Jasaiah Gathings 22-yard pass from Jeff Undercuffler Jr. (Owen Wiley kick) (Drive: 16 plays, 87 yards, 6:32, Kent State 27-17)
- (3:32) AKR - Lorenzo Lingard 37-yard run (Owen Wiley kick) (Drive: 6 plays, 74 yards, 1:29, Kent State 27-24)
- (0:26) AKR - JJeff Undercuffler Jr. 5-yard run (Owen Wiley kick) (Drive: 9 plays, 57 yards, 2:43, Akron 31-27)

Statistics	KENT	AKR
First downs	16	22
Total yards	346	393
Rushing yards	117	95
Passing yards	229	298
Passing: Comp–Att–Int	15–23–0	23–39–0
Time of possession	30:08	29:52

Team	Category	Player	Statistics
Kent State	Passing	Tommy Ulatowski	15/23, 229 yards, 3 TD
Kent State	Rushing	Jaylen Thomas	14 carries, 36 yards
Kent State	Receiving	Crishon McCray	6 receptions, 161 yards, 2 TD
Akron	Passing	Jeff Undercuffler Jr.	23/39, 298 yards, 2 TD
Akron	Rushing	Lorenzo Lingard	22 carries, 106 yards, TD
Akron	Receiving	Daniel George	9 receptions, 104 yards, TD

=== vs Ohio ===
Game Twelve – Ohio Bobcats (8–3) vs. Akron Zips (2–9) – Game summary

Quarter	1	2	3	4	Total
Ohio	3	0	15	7	25
Akron	0	14	0	0	14

at InfoCision Stadium, Akron, OH

- Date: Friday, November 24, 2023
- Game time: 12:00 p.m. EDT
- Game weather: sunny
- Game attendance: 6,152
- Referee: David Siegle
- TV announcers (CBSSN): Carter Blackburn, Adam Breneman

Game information

First Quarter

- (10:50) OHIO - Gianni Spetic 26 yd FG 11 plays, 62 yards, TOP 04:10 (OHIO 3–0)

Second Quarter

- (09:53) AKR - Lorenzo Lingard 43 yd pass from Tahj Bullock (Owen Wiley Kick) 5 plays, 66 yards, TOP 02:30 (AKR 7–3)
- (01:50) AKR - Tahj Bullock 5 yd Run (Owen Wiley Kick) 10 plays, 69 yards, TOP 02:44 (AKR 14–3)

Third Quarter

- (08:16) OHIO - Kurtis Rourke 4 yd run (Kurtis Rourke Pass to Tyler Walton) 9 plays, 76 yards, TOP 03:18 (AKR 14–11)
- (02:06) OHIO - Miles Cross 1 yd pass from Kurtis Rourke (Gianni Spetic Kick) 7 plays, 74 yards, TOP 04:13 (OHIO 18–14)

Fourth Quarter

- (07:23) OHIO - Sieh Bangura 1 yd run (Gianni Spetic Kick) 15 plays, 64 yards, TOP 08:41 (OHIO 25–14)

Statistics	OHIO	AKR
First downs	27	13
Total yards	394	183
Rushes/yards	47/186	20/37
Passing yards	208	146
Passing: Comp–Att–Int	19–30–0	17–30–1
Time of possession	38:35	21:25

Team	Category	Player	Statistics
Ohio	Passing	Kurtis Rourke	19/30, 208 yards, 1 TD
Ohio	Rushing	Sieh Bangura	23 rushes, 121 yards, 1 TD
Ohio	Receiving	Miles Cross	7 receptions, 85 yards, 1 TD
Akron	Passing	Jeff Undercuffler Jr.	16/27, 103 yards, 0 TD, 1 INT
Akron	Rushing	Tahj Bullock	6 rushes, 31 yards, 1 TD
Akron	Receiving	Lorenzo Lingard	5 receptions, 54 yards, 1 TD

== Postseason ==
The Zips were named 2023 National Chumpions by The College Football Pillow Fighters for being the worst team in College Football during the 2023-24 season.
