= Jesús Gómez (American football) =

Mexican gridiron football player (born 2003)

No. 39
- Position: Placekicker

Personal information
- Born: 22 October 2003 (age 23); Puebla, Puebla, Mexico
- Listed height: 6 ft 2 in (1.88 m)
- Listed weight: 215 lb (98 kg)

Career information
- High school: Prepa Tec Puebla (Puebla, Puebla, Mexico)
- College: Eastern Michigan (2021–2024); Arizona State (2025)
- CFL draft: 2026G: 1st round, 3rd overall pick

Career history
- Edmonton Elks (2026)

Awards and highlights
- Second-team All-MAC (2024); Third-team All-MAC (2022)
- Stats at ESPN

Jesús Salvador Gómez Juárez (born 22 October 2003) is a Mexican former professional Canadian football kicker. He played college football for the Arizona State Sun Devils and the Eastern Michigan Eagles.

== Early life ==
Gómez was born on 22 October 2003 in Puebla, Puebla, Mexico, to Jesús Gómez and Yesika Juárez. He grew up in a football (soccer)-oriented family and played the sport for 13 years. Gómez even spent time in the Club Puebla youth system. However, he eventually grew bored of the sport and began playing informal games of American football with his friends in secondary school. His parents permitted him to join a club team as a kicker, though Gómez played as a wide receiver and linebacker for two seasons before his father convinced him to switch positions. He discovered his aptitude for kicking and decided to commit to the position fully.

Gómez attended Prepa Tec Puebla, where he played high school football for the Borregos under head coach Ángel Carrillo. He also had several good performances at kicking camps throughout the United States, which drew attention from NCAA Division I programs. Gómez was rated as a five-star recruit and ranked as the 13th-best kicking prospect in the nation by Kohl's. He committed to play college football at Eastern Michigan University (EMU).

== College career ==
=== Eastern Michigan ===
As a freshman in 2021, Gómez appeared in two games for the Eagles, recording an average of 64 yards in three kickoff attempts with two touchbacks and taking a redshirt. He mostly served as a backup to starter Chad Ryland. Following Ryland's departure, Gómez won the starting kicker role in 2022. He earned Mid-American Conference (MAC) West Division Special Teams Player of the Week honors in mid-September after he went a perfect three-of-three on field goals and three-of-three on extra points in a 30–21 win over Arizona State. On October 22, Gómez tied the program record by making a 55-yard field goal to end the first half in an eventual 20–16 win over Ball State. He played in all 13 games that season and converted 14-of-17 field goal attempts, including two-of-three from beyond 50 yards, as well as a perfect 47-of-47 extra points. Gómez was named the team's Special Teams MVP and earned second-team All-MAC accolades. He was then named to the Lou Groza Award watchlist ahead of the 2023 season. On September 30, Gómez tied his career-high with a 55-yard field goal in a 26–23 loss to Central Michigan. On November 14, he made a game-tying 32-yard field goal against Akron with 10 seconds left in regulation; EMU eventually won in double overtime by a score of 30–27. Gómez finished 12-of-16 on field goal attempts and 21-of-24 on extra points.

In 2024, Gómez had a breakout season for the Eagles. On September 7, he made all three of his field goal attempts, including a school-record 57-yard kick, in a 30–9 loss to Washington. Gómez also became the first player in program history to convert multiple field goals of 50 or more yards in a single game, and earned MAC co-Special Teams Player of the Week honors for his performance. The following week, he converted three-of-four field goals, including the game-winning 34-yard kick, and four-of-four extra points in a 37–34 double overtime victory over Jacksonville State, repeating as MAC co-Special Teams Player of the Week. Gómez won the award for the third week in a row after he converted three-of-three field goals and three-of-four extra points in a 36–0 win over the Saint Francis Red Flash. He captured the award for a fourth time after he made all three field goal attempts and all three extra points in a 38–34 Homecoming win over Central Michigan on October 19. Gómez finished the year converting 20-of-25 field goal attempts and 27-of-29 extra points. After the season, he entered the NCAA transfer portal.

=== Arizona State ===
On December 15, 2024, Gómez announced he would be transferring to Arizona State University (ASU) to play for the Sun Devils. He also received interest from programs such as Auburn, Ole Miss, South Carolina, and Washington. Gómez spoke positively about the favorable kicking conditions in the area – saying weather was "perfect year-round" – as well as the sizable Hispanic community. He also praised the coaching staff, saying: "From the first moment I met the coaches I felt how they care more about me as a person and not a football player. You can see how everyone in the building is bought in to the vision of Coach Dillingham and the future is bright for this program. Conversely, ASU pursued Gómez due to their kicking problems the previous season, with special teams coordinator Charlie Ragle calling him "the best option in the portal". Gómez is left-footed, meaning Ragle had to flip his coaching mechanics, but "he was so good, it didn’t matter."

Gómez entered the 2025 season as one of very few Mexican players at the Power Four level. On September 20, he converted four-of-four field goals – including the game-winning 43-yard kick as time expired – in a 27–24 win over Baylor, earning Big 12 Conference Special Teams Player of the Week honors. The following week, Gómez made a game-winning 23-yard field goal in a 27–24 upset victory over No. 24. TCU. He repeated as the Big 12 Special Teams Player of the Week and became the first Big 12 kicker since 2015 to make game-winning field goals in consecutive games. In mid-October, Gómez helped the Sun Devils pull off another upset, converting four-of-four field goals in a 26–22 win over No. 7 Texas Tech and earning Big 12 Special Teams Player of the Week recognition for the third time. On November 15 against West Virginia, he recorded his first career pass attempt, taking a direct snap on an extra point in the second quarter and completing a pass to tight end Cameron Harpole for the two-point conversion. Gómez went on to kick the game-winning 49-yard field goal to give Arizona State a 25–23 victory on Homecoming. He was named the Big 12 Special Teams Player of the Week for the fourth time.

In his final career game, Gómez converted a career-long 54-yard field goal in a 42–39 loss to Duke in the 2025 Sun Bowl. It tied for the third-longest field goal in program history. Gómez finished the season converting 22-of-30 on field goal attempts and 33-of-33 on extra points. He earned all-Big 12 honorable mention.

== Professional career ==
Pre-draft measurables
Height	Weight	Arm length	Hand span	Wingspan
6 ft 1 in (1.85 m)	217 lb (98 kg)	30 in (0.76 m)	8 1/2 in (0.22 m)	6 ft 0 3/4 in (1.85 m)
All values from Pro Day

On January 6, 2026, Gómez declared for the 2026 NFL draft. He was one of 28 kickers invited to the fourth annual Canadian Football League (CFL) Kicking Showcase, held in San Diego in February, and he was one of 20 Sun Devils who worked out on ASU's Pro Day in March. He went undrafted in the 2026 NFL draft but was drafted in the first round (3rd overall) by the Edmonton Elks in the 2026 CFL global draft. Gomez signed with the Elks on May 14.

On August 3, 2026, Gómez was moved to the retirement list.

== Personal life ==
Gómez was an Academic All-MAC selection and a College Sports Communicators Academic All-District honoree at Eastern Michigan, where he studied mechanical engineering due to his love of auto racing, supporting Mexican driver Checo Pérez as well as the Formula 1 circuit in general. He is also an avid fan of WWE, being a supporter of CM Punk. He has one sister.

Upon his transfer to Arizona State, Gómez appended his mother's maiden name, Juárez, to the nameplate on his jersey, to honor the maternal side of his family.
