= 2023 Cure Bowl =

Postseason college football bowl game

2023 Avocados from Mexico Cure Bowl
- 9th Cure Bowl
Miami RedHawks	Appalachian State Mountaineers
(11–2)	(8–5)
MAC	Sun Belt
9	13
Head coach: Chuck Martin	Head coach: Shawn Clark
	1	2	3	4	Total
Miami	3	0	6	0	9
Appalachian State	3	3	7	0	13
- Date: December 16, 2023
- Season: 2023
- Stadium: FBC Mortgage Stadium
- Location: Orlando, Florida
- MVP: Anderson Castle (RB, Appalachian State)
- Favorite: Appalachian State by 5.5
- Referee: Rory Bernard (CUSA)
- Attendance: 11,121

United States TV coverage
- Network: ABC
- Announcers: Bob Wischusen (play-by-play), Robert Griffin III (analyst), and Kris Budden (sideline)

International TV coverage
- Network: ESPN Brazil
- Announcers: Conrado Giulietti (play-by-play) and Weinny Eirado (analyst)

The 2023 Cure Bowl was a college football bowl game played on December 16, 2023, at FBC Mortgage Stadium in Orlando, Florida. The ninth annual Cure Bowl, the game featured the Appalachian State Mountaineers of the Sun Belt Conference and the Miami RedHawks of the Mid-American Conference. The game began at approximately 3:30 p.m. EST and was aired on ABC. The Cure Bowl was one of the 2023–24 bowl games concluding the 2023 FBS football season. The game was sponsored by the Avocados from Mexico marketing organization, and was officially known as the Avocados from Mexico Cure Bowl.

== Teams ==
Consistent on conference tie-ins, the game featured the Appalachian State Mountaineers of the Sun Belt Conference and the Miami RedHawks of the Mid-American Conference.

This was the first time Appalachian State and Miami played each other, as well as the first time either played in the Cure Bowl.

=== Appalachian State ===
The Mountaineers started the season 2–2, losing in two overtimes to a ranked North Carolina squad as well as to Wyoming on a last-second interception thrown by Joey Aguilar. After Week 7, the Mountaineers sat at just 3–4 and faced the prospect of missing a bowl game for the second straight season. However, App State managed to rally and win their final five regular season games, including an overtime win over then-undefeated James Madison with College GameDay in attendance. Thanks to James Madison's postseason ineligibility due to NCAA transfer rules for programs moving from FCS to FBS, the Mountaineers earned a berth in the Sun Belt Championship, where they lost to Troy, 49–23. The Mountaineers entered the bowl with a record of 8–5.

=== Miami ===
After opening the season with a 38–3 loss at the hands of Miami (FL), the RedHawks rattled off six straight wins, including a 31–24 overtime victory over Cincinnati as a two-touchdown underdog. Their win streak was ended at home against Toledo, where they lost, 21–17. The RedHawks won their next four games to close out the regular season, and clinched the MAC East division title with a 23–10 win over Buffalo. This set up a rematch with Toledo in the MAC Championship, where backup quarterback Aveon Smith led the RedHawks to a victory, 23–14, securing the 2023 MAC conference title for Miami. The RedHawks entered the bowl with a record of 11–2.

== Game summary ==
2023 Avocados from Mexico Cure Bowl

Quarter	1	2	3	4	Total
Miami	3	0	6	0	9
Appalachian State	3	3	7	0	13

at FBC Mortgage Stadium • Orlando, Florida

- Date: Saturday, December 16, 2023
- Game time: 3:30 p.m. EST
- Game weather: Heavy rain • Temperature: 68 °F (20 °C)
- Game attendance: 11,121
- Referee: Rory Bernard
- TV announcers (ABC): Bob Wischusen (play-by-play), Robert Griffin III (analyst), and Kris Budden (sideline)
- Box score

Game information

First Quarter

- (12:50) M-OH – Graham Nicholson 34 yard field goal (Drive: 5 plays, 24 yards, 1:59; Miami 3–0)
- (9:31) APPST – Michael Hughes 29 yard field goal (Drive: 9 plays, 71 yards, 3:19; Tied 3–3)

Second Quarter

- (13:14) APPST – Michael Hughes 22 yard field goal (Drive: 13 plays, 88 yards, 5:55; Appalachian State 6–3)

Third Quarter

- (4:46) APPST – Joey Aguilar 9 yard run, Michael Hughes kick (Drive: 11 plays, 73 yards, 5:42; Appalachian State 13–3)
- (2:05) M-OH – Rashad Amos 23 yard run, Graham Nicholson kick no good (Drive: 1 play, 23 yards, 0:06; Appalachian State 13–9)

Fourth Quarter

No scoring

=== Statistics ===
Statistics	MIA	APP
First downs	11	22
Plays–yards	52–227	73–388
Rushes–yards	42–183	41–177
Passing yards	44	211
Passing: comp–att–int	6–10–0	18–32–1
Time of possession	28:21	31:39

Team	Category	Player	Statistics
Miami	Passing	Maddox Kopp	1/2, 28 yards
Miami	Rushing	Rashad Amos	33 carries, 180 yards, TD
Miami	Receiving	Gage Larvadain	4 receptions, 36 yards
Appalachian State	Passing	Joey Aguilar	18/32, 211 yards, INT
Appalachian State	Rushing	Anderson Castle	20 carries, 119 yards
Appalachian State	Receiving	Kaedin Robinson	8 receptions, 118 yards
