= 2023 Bowling Green Falcons football team =

American college football season

2023 Bowling Green Falcons football

Quick Lane Bowl, L 24–30 vs. Minnesota
- Conference: Mid-American Conference
- East Division
- Record: 7–6 (5–3 MAC)
- Head coach: Scot Loeffler (5th season)
- Co-offensive coordinators: Max Warner (2nd season); Greg Nosal (2nd season)
- Offensive scheme: Pro spread
- Co-defensive coordinators: Steve Morrison (1st season); Sammy Lawanson (1st season)
- Base defense: Multiple 4–3
- Home stadium: Doyt Perry Stadium

2023 Mid-American Conference football standings
	Conf.			Overall
Team	W		L	W		L
East Division
Miami (OH) xy$	7	–	1	11	–	3
Ohio	6	–	2	10	–	3
Bowling Green	5	–	3	7	–	6
Buffalo	3	–	5	3	–	9
Akron	1	–	7	2	–	10
Kent State	0	–	8	1	–	11
West Division
Toledo xy	8	–	0	11	–	3
Northern Illinois	5	–	3	7	–	6
Eastern Michigan	4	–	4	6	–	7
Central Michigan	3	–	5	5	–	7
Ball State	3	–	5	4	–	8
Western Michigan	3	–	5	4	–	8
Championship: Miami (OH) 23, Toledo 14
$ – Conference champion; x – Division champion/co-champions; y – Championship game participant

The 2023 Bowling Green Falcons football team represented Bowling Green State University during the 2023 NCAA Division I FBS football season. The Falcons were led by fifth-year head coach Scot Loeffler and played their home games at Doyt Perry Stadium in Bowling Green, Ohio. The Bowling Green Falcons football team drew an average home attendance of 13,462 in 2023.

The Bowling Green Falcons competed as members of the East Division of the Mid-American Conference (MAC). They finished the regular season 7–5 and 5–3 in conference play securing their first winning season since 2015. They played Minnesota in the Quick Lane Bowl, where they lost 24–30.

== Preseason ==
=== Preseason coaches poll ===
On July 20, the MAC announced the preseason coaches poll. Bowling Green was picked to finish fourth in the East.

== Schedule ==
Date	Time	Opponent	Site	TV	Result	Attendance
September 2	12:00 p.m.	at Liberty*	Williams Stadium; Lynchburg, VA	CBSSN	L 24–34	18,811
September 9	2:00 p.m.	Eastern Illinois*	Doyt Perry Stadium; Bowling Green, OH	ESPN+	W 38–15	12,312
September 16	7:30 p.m.	at No. 2 Michigan*	Michigan Stadium; Ann Arbor, MI	BTN	L 6–31	109,955
September 23	3:30 p.m.	Ohio^{†}	Doyt Perry Stadium; Bowling Green, OH	ESPN+	L 7–38	18,248
September 30	3:30 p.m.	at Georgia Tech*	Bobby Dodd Stadium; Atlanta, GA	ACCN	W 38–27	30,097
October 7	3:30 p.m.	at Miami (OH)	Yager Stadium; Oxford, OH	ESPN+	L 0–27	19,047
October 14	3:30 p.m.	at Buffalo	University at Buffalo Stadium; Amherst, NY	ESPN+	W 24–14	15,196
October 21	2:00 p.m.	Akron	Doyt Perry Stadium; Bowling Green, OH	ESPN+	W 41–14	10,068
November 1	7:30 p.m.	Ball State	Doyt Perry Stadium; Bowling Green, OH	ESPN2	W 24–21	6,091
November 8	7:00 p.m.	at Kent State	Dix Stadium; Kent, OH (Anniversary Award)	CBSSN	W 49–19	6,065
November 14	7:00 p.m.	Toledo	Doyt Perry Stadium; Bowling Green, OH (Battle of I-75)	ESPN2	L 31–32	20,590
November 21	7:00 p.m.	at Western Michigan	Waldo Stadium; Kalamazoo, MI	ESPNU	W 34–10	8,901
December 26	2:00 p.m.	vs. Minnesota	Ford Field; Detroit, MI (Quick Lane Bowl)	ESPN	L 24–30	28,521
*Non-conference game; ^{†}Homecoming; Rankings from AP Poll released prior to the game; All times are in Eastern time

== Roster ==
2023 Bowling Green Falcons football team roster
Players
Coaches
Offense

Pos.	#	Name	Class
RB	0	Ta'ron Keith	Jr
WR	1	Odieu Hiliare	Sr
WR	2	Abdul-Fatai Ibrahim	Sr
QB	3	Lucian Anderson III	Fr
RB	4	Terion Stewart	So
RB	5	Nick Mosley	Jr
WR	5	Jaylon Tillman	Jr
QB	7	Connor Bazelak	Sr
WR	8	Jhaylin Embry	Jr
TE	9	Griffin Little	Jr
TE	10	Levi Gazarek	Jr
WR	11	Finn Hogan	So
QB	12	Camden Orth	Sr
WR	13	Cynceir McNeal	Fr
QB	15	Colman Teasdale	Fr
QB	16	Hayden Timosciek	Fr
WR	17	Tae'Shaun Johnson	So
WR	18	Austin Osborne	Sr
WR	19	Shawn Thigpen	Fr
RB	20	Jamal Johnson	Jr
RB	21	Chris Edmonds	Fr
WR	23	Trimaine Brown Jr.	Fr
RB	24	Bryce DeFalco	Fr
WR	26	Trey Johnson	Fr
TE	27	Nic Kilbride	Jr
RB	28	Jaison Patterson	Jr
RB	30	PaSean Wimberly	Sr
TE	44	Harold Fannin Jr.	So
TE	45	Rocco Hicks	So
OT	50	Alex Wollschlaeger	Jr
G	51	Cedric Dunbar II	Sr
G	52	Chris Akporoghene	Sr
OT	53	Tunde Fatukasi	Jr
C	54	Brody Bolyn	Fr
OT	56	Armon Bethea	So
G	57	Alex Padgett	So
G	64	Bronson Warner	Jr
C	65	Jake Burns	Jr
C/OG	72	Cade Zimmerly	So
OT	75	Nate Pabst	So
OT	76	Kameren Stewart	Sr
G	77	James Thomaas Jr.	Fr
OT	79	Darius Gaddy	So
TE	81	Bryce Boyer	So
WR	83	Andre Robinson	Fr
WR	84	Dom Grguric	So
TE	86	Ian Drummond	Sr
WR	87	Jared Merk	Fr
TE	88	Jacob Harris	Fr
TE	89	Andrew Bench	Sr

Defense

Pos.	#	Name	Class
OLB	0	Cashius Howell	So
CB	1	Jordan Oladokun	Jr
ILB	2	Brock Horne	Sr
ILB	3	Joseph Sipp Jr.	So
CB	4	Deshawn Jones Jr.	Jr
S	5	Shamoun Duncan-Niusulu	Jr
S	6	Davion Daniels	Sr
CB	7	Davon Ferguson	Jr
S	8	Trent Simms	Jr
S	9	Darius Lorfils	So
CB	10	Justin Lynch	Jr
OLB	11	Demetrius Hardamon	Sr
OLB	12	Marquette Harris	Jr
OLB	13	Charles Rosser	Jr
ILB	14	Davian Mayo	Jr
OLB	15	Avi McGary	Sr
DL	16	Chace Davis	Jr
DL	17	Bam Booker	Fr
CB	18	Jalen Burton	Jr
OLB	19	Alijah Williams	Fr
CB	20	Romello Flowers	Fr
S	21	Jordan Jackson	Sr
CB	22	Jalen Huskey	So
ILB	23	Darren Anders	Sr
ILB	24	Diego Neri	Jr
OLB	25	Canaan Williams	Fr
S	26	Tracy Revels	Fr
ILB	28	David Afogho	Fr
S	32	Patrick Day	Sr
DL	33	Jordan Porter	Sr
DL	34	Adrian Wilson	Jr
DL	35	Billie Roberts	Jr
ILB	36	Jabari Mitchell	Fr
S	37	Victor Vazquez	So
DL	38	Dierre Kelly	Jr
ILB	42	Chris Williams	Jr
CB	44	Jace Henry	Fr
ILB	46	James Miller	Sr
OLB	48	Myles Bradley	Fr
DL	52	Kitione Tau	Sr
DL	54	Anthony Hawkins	Sr
DL	55	Evan Branch-Haynes	So
DL	56	Ian van der Merwe	Fr
DL	57	Dayln White	Fr
DL	60	Dontrez Brown	Sr
DL	90	Davonte Miles	Fr
DL	99	Ali Saad	Jr

Special teams

Pos.	#	Name	Class
P	14	Jackson Kleather	Fr
PK	40	Ethan Warner	Fr
LS	42	Aiden Wilson	Fr
K	43	Jack Sauder	Jr
LS	47	George Carlson	So
PK	85	Travis Kenner	Fr
K	98	Alan Anaya	So
P	99	Sami Sir	So

Head coach

- Scot Loeffler

Coordinators/assistant coaches

- Steve Morrison – Co-Defensive Coordinator / Inside Linebackers
- Sammy Lawanson – Co-Defensive Coordinator / Outside Linebackers
- Greg Nosal – Co-Offensive Coordinator / Run Game Coordinator / Offensive Line
- Max Warner – Co-Offensive Coordinator / Quarterbacks
- Alex Bayer – Special Teams Coordinator / Tight Ends
- Julian Campenni – Assistant Head Coach / Defensive Run Coordinator / Defensive Line
- Erik Campbell – Passing Game Coordinator / Wide Receivers
- Beyah Rasool – Assistant Coach / Cornerbacks / Special Teams Assistant
- Brian White – Assistant Coach / Running backs
- Kevin Tolbert – Head Football Sports Performance Coach
- Ian Samuelson – Assistant Director of Sports Performance
- Grant Strock – Offensive Graduate Assistant
- Brady Thomas – Defensive Graduate Assistant
- Johnny Caughman – Defensive Quality Control
- Jack McCarthy – Offensive Quality Control

Legend

- (C) Team captain
- (S) Suspended
- (I) Ineligible
- Injured
- Redshirt

Roster

== Game summaries ==
=== At Liberty ===
Game One – Bowling Green Falcons (0-0) at Liberty Flames (0-0) – Game summary

Quarter	1	2	3	4	Total
Bowling Green	0	14	10	0	24
Liberty	7	17	7	3	34

at Williams Stadium • Lynchburg, Virginia

- Date: Saturday, September 2, 2023
- Game time: 12:00 p.m. EDT
- Game weather: Sunny, 78 °F (26 °C) • Wind: SW 5 mph (8.0 km/h)
- Game attendance: 18,811
- Referee: Jeremy Valentine
- TV announcers (CBSSN): Chick Hernandez and Taylor McHargue

Game information

First quarter

- (10:34) LIB – Billy Lucas 2-yard run (Teagen Lenderink kick) (Drive: 9 plays, 71 yards, 4:20; Liberty 7-0)

Second quarter

- (08:18) LIB – Vaughn Blue 12-yard pass from Kaidon Salter (Teagen Lenderink kick) (Drive: 8 plays, 66 yards, 3:52; Liberty 14-0)
- (06:51) LIB – Kobe Singleton 36-yard interception return Teagen Lenderink kick) (Liberty 21-0)
- (05:48) LIB – Teagen Lenderink 36-yard field goal (Drive: 4 plays, 6 yards, :54; Liberty 24-0)
- (03:36) BGSU – Ta'ron Keith 14-yard run (Alan Anaya kick) (Drive: 5 plays, 65 yards, 2:12; Liberty 24-7)
- (00:20) BGSU – Trent Simms 76-yard blocked field goal return (Alan Anaya kick)(Liberty 24-14

Third quarter

- (11:36) BGSU – Alan Anaya 34-yard field goal (Drive: 10 plays, 72 yards, 3:20; Liberty 24-17)
- (08:35) LIB – Bentley Hanshaw 17-yard pass from Kaidon Salter (Teagen Lenderink kick) (Drive: 7 plays, 75 yards, 3:01; Liberty 31-17)
- (04:04) BGSU – Odieu Hiliare 32-yard pass from Camden Orth (Alan Anaya kick) (Drive: 11 plays, 75 yards, 4:31; Liberty 31-24)

Fourth quarter

- (02:52) LIB – Teagen Lenderink 36-yard field goal (Drive: 6 plays, 14 yards, 1:24; Liberty 34-24)

Statistics	Bowling Green	Liberty
First downs	19	22
Plays–yards	62-328	69-389
Rushes–yards	31–191	49–246
Passing yards	137	246
Passing: comp–att–int	11–31–5	11–20–0
Turnovers		
Time of possession	27:05	32:55

Team	Category	Player	Statistics
Bowling Green	Passing	Connor Bazelak	6/21, 71 yards, 3 INT
Bowling Green	Rushing	Ta'ron Keith	3 carries, 69 yards, TD
Bowling Green	Receiving	Odieu Hiliare	4 receptions, 59 yards, TD
Liberty	Passing	Kaidon Salter	11/20, 143 yards, 2 TDS
Liberty	Rushing	Kaidon Salter	19 carries, 82 yards
Liberty	Receiving	Treon Sibley	3 receptions, 56 yards

=== Eastern Illinois ===
Game Two – Eastern Illinois Panthers (1-0) at Bowling Green Falcons (0-1) – Game summary

Quarter	1	2	3	4	Total
Eastern Illinois	6	6	0	3	15
Bowling Green	7	14	10	7	38

at Doyt Perry Stadium • Bowling Green, OH

- Date: Saturday, September 9, 2023
- Game time: 1:00 p.m. EDT
- Game weather: Sunny, 72 °F (22 °C) • Wind: NE 8 mph (13 km/h)
- Game attendance: 12,312
- Referee: Phil Hicks
- TV announcers (ESPN+): David Wilson and Bob Gennarelli

Game information

First quarter

- (09:43) BGSU – Odieu Hiliare 10-yard pass from Connor Bazelak (Alan Anaya kick) (Drive: 11 plays, 90 yards, 5:11; Bowling Green 7-0)
- (04:57) EIU – Kevin Daniels 15-yard pass from Pierce Holley (William Orth kick failed) (Drive: 10 plays, 65 yards, 4:42; Bowling Green 7-6)

Second quarter

- (12:10) BGSU – Terion Stewart 1-yard run (Alan Anaya kick) (Drive: 6 plays, 50 yards, 3:17; Bowling Green 14-6)
- (07:02) BGSU – Abdul-Fatai Ibrahim 11-yard pass from Connor Bazelak (Alan Anaya kick) (Drive: 8 plays, 56 yards, 3:29; Bowling Green 21-6)
- (01:31) EIU – DeAirious Smith 11-yard pass from Pierce Holley (Holley pass failed) (Drive: 11 plays, 90 yards, 5:24; Bowling Green 21-12)

Third quarter

- (03:23) BGSU – Alan Anaya 27-yard field goal (Drive: 14 plays, 71 yards, 5:18; Bowling Green 24-12)
- (01:07) BGSU – Harold Fannin Jr. 19-yard pass from Connor Bazelak (Alan Anaya kick) (Drive: 3 plays, 74 yards, 1:18; Bowling Green 31-12)

Fourth quarter

- (10:32) EIU – Julian Patino 31-yard field goal (Drive: 11 plays, 57 yards, 5:30; Bowling Green 31-15)
- (08:35) BGSU – Terion Stewart 1-yard run (Alan Anaya kick) (Drive: 5 plays, 75 yards, 1:57; Bowling Green 38-15)

Statistics	Eastern Illinois	Bowling Green
First downs	20	25
Plays–yards	59-325	64-509
Rushes–yards	26–75	34–141
Passing yards	250	368
Passing: comp–att–int	21–33–1	25-30-0
Turnovers		
Time of possession	29:48	30:12

Team	Category	Player	Statistics
Eastern Illinois	Passing	Pierce Holley	21/32, 250 yards, 2 TDS, 1 INT
Eastern Illinois	Rushing	Kevin Daniels	15 carries, 78 yards
Eastern Illinois	Receiving	DeAirious Smith	4 receptions, 83 yards, TD
Bowling Green	Passing	Connor Bazelak	23/28, 319 yards, 3 TDS
Bowling Green	Rushing	Terion Stewart	10 carries, 51 yards, 2 TDS
Bowling Green	Receiving	Ta'ron Keith	6 receptions, 123 yards

=== At Michigan ===
Game Three – Bowling Green Falcons (1-1) at No. 2 Michigan Wolverines (2-0) – Game summary

Quarter	1	2	3	4	Total
Bowling Green	0	6	0	0	6
Michigan	7	7	17	0	31

at Michigan Stadium • Ann Arbor, MI

- Date: Saturday, September 16, 2023
- Game time: 7:30 p.m. EDT
- Game weather: Sunny, 67 °F (19 °C) • Wind: SW 5 mph (8.0 km/h)
- Game attendance: 109,955
- Referee: Larry Smith
- TV announcers (BTN): Cory Provus, Jake Butt, and Brooke Fletcher

Game information

First quarter

- (10:44) MICH – Blake Corum 4-yard run (James Turner kick) (Drive: 4 plays, 77 yards, 1:52; Michigan 7-0)

Second quarter

- (14:13) BGSU – Alan Anaya 36-yard field goal (Drive: 12 plays, 62 yards, 5:35; Michigan 7-3)
- (11:39) BGSU – Alan Anaya 42-yard field goal (Drive: 4 plays, 9 yards, 2:23; Michigan 7-6)
- (05:48) MICH – Roman Wilson 33-yard pass from J. J. McCarthy (James Turner kick) (Drive: 5 plays, 67 yards, 2:42; Michigan 14-6)

Third quarter

- (12:44) MICH – Blake Corum 2-yard run (James Turner kick) (Drive: 1 play, 2 yards, :04; Michigan 21-6)
- (12:44) MICH – James Turner 42-yard field goal (Drive: 4 plays, 2 yards, 1:41; Michigan 24-6)
- (06:28) MICH – Cornelius Johnson 50-yard pass from J.J. McCarthy (James Turner kick) (Drive: 3 plays, 61 yards, 1:30; Michigan 31-6)

Statistics	Bowling Green	Michigan
First downs	10	15
Plays–yards	57-205	44-389
Rushes–yards	36–81	31–169
Passing yards	124	143
Passing: comp–att–int	14–21–2	8–13–3
Turnovers		
Time of possession	36:13	23:47

Team	Category	Player	Statistics
Bowling Green	Passing	Camden Orth	8/11, 91 yards
Bowling Green	Rushing	Nick Mosley	4 carries, 33 yards
Bowling Green	Receiving	Odieu Hiliare	2 receptions, 37 yards
Michigan	Passing	J. J. McCarthy	8/13, 143 yards, 2 TDS, 3 INTS
Michigan	Rushing	Blake Corum	12 carries, 101 yards, 2 TDS
Michigan	Receiving	Cornelius Johnson	3 receptions, 71 yards, 1 TD

=== Ohio ===
Game Four – Ohio Bobcats (3-1) at Bowling Green Falcons (1-2) – Game summary

Quarter	1	2	3	4	Total
Ohio	21	10	7	0	38
Bowling Green	0	0	0	7	7

at Doyt Perry Stadium • Bowling Green, OH

- Date: Saturday, September 23, 2023
- Game time: 3:30 p.m. EDT
- Game weather: Sunny, 72 °F (22 °C) • Wind: NE 13 mph (21 km/h)
- Game attendance: 18,248
- Referee: Rich Edwards
- TV announcers (ESPN+): Doug Sherman, Marcus Ray

Game information

First quarter

- (13:08) OU – Sieh Bangura 29-yard pass from Kurtis Rourke (Gianni Spetic kick) (Drive: 2 plays, 28 yards, 1:12; Ohio 7-0)
- (08:38) OU – Will Kacmarek 10-yard pass from Kurtis Rourke (Gianni Spetic kick) (Drive: 6 plays, 79 yards, 3:33; Ohio 14-0)
- (05:09) OU – Keye Thompson 71-yard fumble recovery (Gianni Spetic kick) (Ohio 21-0)

Second quarter

- (08:43) OU – Gianni Spetic 27-yard field goal (Drive: 9 plays, 58 yards, 4:51; Ohio 24-0)
- (08:35) OU – Roman Parodie 28-yard fumble recovery (Gianni Spetic kick) (Ohio 31-0)

Third quarter

- (01:22) OU – Miles Cross 19-yard pass from Kurtis Rourke (Gianni Spetic kick) (Drive: 10 plays, 77 yards, 6:33; Ohio 38-0)

Fourth quarter

- (13:42) BGSU – Terion Stewart 4-yard run (Alan Anaya kick) (Drive: 6 plays, 69 yards, 2:35; Ohio 38-7)

Statistics	Ohio	Bowling Green
First downs	19	10
Plays–yards	328	211
Rushes–yards	37–127	22-102
Passing yards	201	109
Passing: comp–att–int	16–19–0	16-31-2
Turnovers		
Time of possession	34:13	25:47

Team	Category	Player	Statistics
Ohio	Passing	Kurtis Rourke	14/16, 196 yards, 3 TDS
Ohio	Rushing	O'Shaan Allison	13 carries, 42 yards
Ohio	Receiving	Jacoby Jones	4 receptions, 85 yards
Bowling Green	Passing	Connor Bazelak	16/31, 109 yards, 2 INTS
Bowling Green	Rushing	Terion Stewart	12 carries, 107 yards, 1 TD
Bowling Green	Receiving	Odieu Hiliare	5 receptions, 45 yards

=== At Georgia Tech ===
Game Five – Bowling Green Falcons (1-3) at Georgia Tech Yellow Jackets (2-2) – Game summary

Quarter	1	2	3	4	Total
Bowling Green	7	10	21	0	38
Georgia Tech	14	0	6	7	27

at Bobby Dodd Stadium • Atlanta, Georgia

- Date: Saturday, September 30, 2023
- Game time: 3:30 p.m. EDT
- Game weather: Sunny, 85 °F (29 °C) • Wind: NE 3 mph (4.8 km/h)
- Game attendance: 30,097
- Referee: Jeff Flanagan
- TV announcers (ACCN): Chris Cotter, Mark Herzlich & Marilyn Payne

Game information

First quarter

- (14:43) GT – Eric Singleton Jr. 53-yard pass from Haynes King (Aidan Birr kick) (Drive: 1 play, 53 yards, :08; Georgia Tech 7-0)
- (09:40) GT – Christian Leary 11-yard pass from Haynes King (Aidan Birr kick) (Drive: 5 plays, 71 yards, 1:55; Georgia Tech 14-0)
- (04:16) BGSU – Camden Orth 1-yard run (Alan Anaya kick) (Drive: 10 plays, 75 yards, 5:24; Georgia Tech 14-7)

Second quarter

- (08:27) BGSU – Alan Anaya 40-yard field goal (Drive: 11 plays, 42 yards, 5:29; Georgia Tech 14-10)
- (02:37) BGSU – Finn Hogan 14-yard pass from Connor Bazelak (Alan Anaya kick) (Drive: 10 plays, 40 yards, 4:42; Bowling Green 17-14)

Third quarter

- (11:33) BGSU – Connor Bazelak 1-yard run (Alan Anaya kick) (Drive: 7 plays, 75 yards, 3:27; Bowling Green 24-14)
- (03:13) BGSU – Terion Stewart 6-yard run (Alan Anaya kick) (Drive: 10 plays, 86 yards, 5:06; Bowling Green 31-14)
- (02:28) BGSU – Deshawn Jones Jr. 45-yard interception return (Alan Anaya kick) (Bowling Green 38-14)
- (00:25) GT – Malik Rutherford 15-yard pass from Haynes King (King pass failed) (Drive: 8 plays, 81 yards, 1:58; Bowling Green 38-20)

Fourth quarter

- (01:35) GT – Abdul Janneh 16-yard pass from Haynes King (Aidan Birr kick) (Drive: 10 plays, 65 yards, 2:26; Bowling Green 38-27)

Statistics	Bowling Green	Georgia Tech
First downs	26	27
Plays–yards	438	417
Rushes–yards	45–175	32–69
Passing yards	263	348
Passing: comp–att–int	21–33–0	23–37–2
Turnovers		
Time of possession	42:45	17:15

Team	Category	Player	Statistics
Bowling Green	Passing	Connor Bazelak	21/32, 263 yards, 1 TD
Bowling Green	Rushing	Terion Stewart	26 carries, 138 yards, 1 TD
Bowling Green	Receiving	Finn Hogan	6 receptions, 102 yards, 1 TD
Georgia Tech	Passing	Haynes King	23/37, 348 yards, 4 TDS, 2 INTS
Georgia Tech	Rushing	Haynes King	10 carries, 28 yards
Georgia Tech	Receiving	Dominick Blaylock	7 receptions, 131 yards

=== At Miami (OH) ===
Game Six – Bowling Green Falcons (2-3) at Miami RedHawks (4-1) – Game summary

Quarter	1	2	3	4	Total
Bowling Green	0	0	0	0	0
Miami (OH)	7	7	10	3	27

at Yager Stadium • Oxford, OH

- Date: Saturday, October 7, 2023
- Game time: 3:30 p.m. EDT
- Game weather: Cloudy, 60 °F (16 °C) • Wind: NW 14 mph (23 km/h)
- Game attendance: 19,047
- Referee: William Williams
- TV announcers (ESPN+): David Wilson, Marcus Ray

Game information

First quarter

- (03:29) MIA – Rashad Amos 1-yard run (Graham Nicholson kick) (Drive: 17 plays, 75 yards, 11:31; Miami 7-0)

Second quarter

- (00:52) MIA – Nate Muersch 2-yard pass from Brett Gabbert (Graham Nicholson kick) (Drive: 10 plays, 82 yards, 3:53; Miami 14-0)

Third quarter

- (03:33) MIA – Kenny Tracy 39-yard pass from Brett Gabbert (Graham Nicholson kick) (Drive: 9 plays, 72 yards, 5:17; Miami 21-0)
- (00:09) MIA – Graham Nicholson 52-yard field goal (Drive: 4 plays, 2 yards, 1:34; Miami 24-0)

Fourth quarter

- (03:21) MIA – Graham Nicholson 30-yard field goal (Drive: 13 plays, 51 yards, 9:54; Miami 27-0)

Statistics	Bowling Green	Miami
First downs	9	20
Plays–yards	135	356
Rushes–yards	19–63	47–186
Passing yards	72	170
Passing: comp–att–int	11–23–1	15–18–0
Turnovers		
Time of possession	20:31	39:29

Team	Category	Player	Statistics
Bowling Green	Passing	Connor Bazelak	8/17, 64 yards, 1 INT
Bowling Green	Rushing	Terion Stewart	8 carries, 63 yards
Bowling Green	Receiving	Odieu Hiliare	4 receptions, 27 yards
Miami	Passing	Brett Gabbert	15/18, 170 yards, 2 TDS
Miami	Rushing	Kenny Tracy	11 carries, 58 yards
Miami	Receiving	Joe Wilkins	6 receptions, 70 yards

=== At Buffalo ===
Game Seven – Bowling Green Falcons (2-4) at Buffalo Bulls (2-4) – Game summary

Quarter	1	2	3	4	Total
Bowling Green	10	14	0	0	24
Buffalo	7	0	7	0	14

at University at Buffalo Stadium • Amherst, NY

- Date: Saturday, October 14, 2023
- Game time: 3:30 p.m. EDT
- Game weather: Rain, 51 °F (11 °C) • Wind: SW 8 mph (13 km/h)
- Game attendance: 15,196
- Referee: David Siegle
- TV announcers (ESPN+): Doug Sherman, Je'Rod Cherry

Game information

First quarter

- (07:38) BUFF – Cole Snyder 10-yard run (Alex McNulty kick) (Drive: 3 plays, 33 yards, 1:30; Buffalo 7-0)
- (02:42) BGSU – Alan Anaya 23-yard field goal (Drive: 9 plays, 70 yards, 4:56; Buffalo 7-3)
- (00:25) BGSU – Camden Orth 1-yard run (Alan Anaya kick) (Drive: 3 plays, 9 yards, 1:23; Bowling Green 10-7)

Second quarter

- (05:23) BGSU – Ta'ron Keith 3-yard pass from Camden Orth (Alan Anaya kick) (Drive: 13 plays, 86 yards, 8:06; Bowling Green 17-7)
- (02:20) BGSU – PeSean Wimberly 18-yard blocked punt return (Alan Anaya kick) (Bowling Green 24-7)

Third quarter

- (03:02) BUFF – Darrell Harding Jr. 24-yard pass from CJ Ogbonna (Alex McNulty kick) (Drive: 8 plays, 74 yards, 4:33; Bowling Green 24-14)

Statistics	Bowling Green	Buffalo
First downs	13	18
Plays–yards	295	238
Rushes–yards	43–218	37–167
Passing yards	295	71
Passing: comp–att–int	9–16–2	9–29–4
Turnovers		
Time of possession	33:28	26:32

Team	Category	Player	Statistics
Bowling Green	Passing	Camden Orth	9/16, 77 yards, 1 TD, 2 INTS
Bowling Green	Rushing	Terion Stewart	25 carries, 123 yards
Bowling Green	Receiving	Austin Osborne	3 receptions, 59 yards
Buffalo	Passing	C. J. Ogbonna	4/14, 41 yards, 1 TD, 2 INTS
Buffalo	Rushing	Ron Cook Jr.	12 carries, 47 yards
Buffalo	Receiving	Darrell Harding Jr.	2 receptions, 39 yards, 1 TD

=== Akron ===
Game Eight – Akron Zips (1-6) at Bowling Green Falcons (3-4) – Game summary

Quarter	1	2	3	4	Total
Akron	7	0	0	7	14
Bowling Green	3	10	21	7	41

at Doyt Perry Stadium • Bowling Green, OH

- Date: Saturday, October 21, 2023
- Game time: 2:00 p.m. EDT
- Game weather: Sunny, 52 °F (11 °C) • Wind: W 7 mph (11 km/h)
- Game attendance: 10,068
- Referee: Jeremy Valentine
- TV announcers (ESPN+): Michael Reghi, Marcus Ray

Game information

First quarter

- (09:58) BGSU – Alan Anaya 36-yard field goal (Drive: 11 plays, 52 yards, 4:56; Bowling Green 3-0)
- (01:11) AKR – Lorenzo Lingard 13-yard run (Noah Perez kick) (Drive: 7 plays, 72 yards, 3:40; Akron 7-3)

Second quarter

- (12:18) BGSU – Terion Stewart 3-yard run (Alan Anaya kick) (Drive: 1 play, 3 yards, :05; Bowling Green 10-7)
- (00:00) BGSU – Alan Anaya 33-yard field goal (Drive: 2 plays, 0 yards, :10; Bowling Green 13-7)

Third quarter

- (05:02) BGSU – Terion Stewart 16-yard run (Alan Anaya kick) (Drive: 10 plays, 88 yards, 5:34; Bowling Green 20-7)
- (03:20) BGSU – Terion Stewart 2-yard run (Alan Anaya kick) (Drive: 3 plays, 9 yards, 1:32; Bowling Green 27-7)
- (00:28) BGSU – Harold Fannin Jr. 8-yard pass from Connor Bazelak (Alan Anaya kick) (Drive: 3 plays,36 yards, 1:01; Bowling Green 34-7)

Fourth quarter

- (07:58) BGSU – Abdul-Fatai Ibrahim 8-yard pass from Camden Orth (Alan Anaya kick) (Drive: 7 plays,35 yards, 5:04; Bowling Green 41-7)
- (03:02) AKR – Drake Anderson 4-yard run (Noah Perez kick) (Drive: 11 plays,75 yards, 4:56; Bowling Green 41-14)

Statistics	Akron	Bowling Green
First downs	18	15
Plays–yards	279	297
Rushes–yards	28–45	42–214
Passing yards	234	83
Passing: comp–att–int	22–39–2	8-14-0
Turnovers		
Time of possession	29:56	30:04

Team	Category	Player	Statistics
Akron	Passing	Jeff Undercuffler	22/39, 234 yards, 2 INTS
Akron	Rushing	Lorenzo Lingard	12 carries, 56 yards, 1 TD
Akron	Receiving	Daniel George	7 receptions, 74 yards
Bowling Green	Passing	Connor Bazelak	6/11, 69 yards, 1 TD
Bowling Green	Rushing	Terion Stewart	19 carries, 131 yards, 3 TDS
Bowling Green	Receiving	Harold Fannin Jr.	2 receptions, 34 yards, 1 TD

=== Ball State ===
Game Nine – Ball State Cardinals (2-6) at Bowling Green Falcons (4-4) – Game summary

Quarter	1	2	3	4	Total
Ball State	0	7	7	7	21
Bowling Green	7	7	0	10	24

at Doyt Perry Stadium • Bowling Green, OH

- Date: Wednesday, November 1, 2023
- Game time: 7:00 p.m. EDT
- Game weather: Cloudy, 37 °F (3 °C) • Wind: SW 7 mph (11 km/h)
- Game attendance: 6,091
- Referee: Matt Packowski
- TV announcers (ESPN2): Mike Corey, Rocky Boiman

Game information

First quarter

- (07:43) BGSU – Harold Fannin Jr. 23-yard pass from Connor Bazelak (Alan Anaya kick) (Drive: 4 plays, 31 yards, 1:20; Bowling Green 7-0)

Second quarter

- (14:06) BSU – Kiael Kelly 6-yard run (Jackson Courville kick) (Drive: 17 plays, 74 yards, 8:27; Tied 7-7)
- (04:40) BGSU – Terion Stewart 54-yard run (Alan Anaya kick) (Drive: 2 plays, 54 yards, :20; Bowling Green 14-7)

Third quarter

- (05:04) BSU – Marquez Cooper 5-yard run (Jackson Courville kick) (Drive: 13 plays, 62 yards, 8:03; Tied 14-14)

Fourth quarter

- (13:20) BGSU – Ta'ron Keith 10-yard pass from Connor Bazelak (Alan Anaya kick) (Drive:12 plays, 75 yards, 5:43; Bowling Green 21-14)
- (09:07) BSU – Kiael Kelly 44-yard run (Jackson Courville kick) (Drive: 7 plays, 75 yards, 4:13; Tied 21-21)
- (03:14) BGSU – Alan Anaya 22-yard field goal (Drive: 11 plays, 39 yards, 5:43; Bowling Green 24-21)

Statistics	Ball State	Bowling Green
First downs	16	13
Plays–yards	283	281
Rushes–yards	49–217-3	34–104
Passing yards	66	177
Passing: comp–att–int	9–19–0	15-23-0
Turnovers		
Time of possession	33:34	26:26

Team	Category	Player	Statistics
Ball State	Passing	Kiael Kelly	9/19, 66 yards
Ball State	Rushing	Marquez Cooper/Kiael Kelly	25 carries, 90 yards, 1 TD/ 25 carries, 90 yards, 2 TDS
Ball State	Receiving	Ahmad Edwards	3 receptions, 25 yards
Bowling Green	Passing	Connor Bazelak	13/21, 128 yards, 2 TDS
Bowling Green	Rushing	Terion Stewart	15 carries, 92 yards, 1 TD
Bowling Green	Receiving	Harold Fannin Jr.	5 receptions, 92 yards, 1 TD

=== At Kent State ===
Game Ten – Bowling Green Falcons (5-4) at Kent State Golden Flashes (1-8) – Game summary

Quarter	1	2	3	4	Total
Bowling Green	14	14	0	21	49
Kent State	3	3	7	6	19

at Dix Stadium • Kent, OH

- Date: Wednesday, November 8, 2023
- Game time: 7:00 p.m. EDT
- Game weather: Sunny, 53 °F (12 °C) • Wind: E 8 mph (13 km/h)
- Game attendance: 6,065
- Referee: Andrew Speciale
- TV: CBSSN

Game information

First quarter

- (08:58) KENT – Andrew Glass 48-yard field goal (Drive: 11 plays, 39 yards, 5:56; Kent State 3-0)
- (02:01) BGSU – Camden Orth 1-yard run (Alan Anaya kick) (Drive: 5 plays, 31 yards, 2:49; Bowling Green 7-3)
- (00:16) BGSU – Harold Fannin Jr. 47-yard pass from Connor Bazelak (Alan Anaya kick) (Drive: 1 play, 47 yards, :09; Bowling Green 14-3)

Second quarter

- (11:39) KENT – Andrew Glass 32-yard field goal (Drive: 7 plays, 55 yards, 3:30;Bowling Green 14-6)
- (05:18) BGSU – Ta'ron Keith 45-yard pass from Camden Orth (Alan Anaya kick) (Drive: 3 plays, 80 yards, 1:20;Bowling Green 21-6)
- (00:51) BGSU – Camden Orth 2-yard run (Alan Anaya kick) (Drive: 8 plays, 64 yards, 3:24; Bowling Green 28-6)

Third quarter

- (05:00) KENT – Hayden Junker 21-yard pass from Tommy Ulatowski (Andrew Glass kick) (Drive: 3 plays, 32 yards, :54; Bowling Green 28-13)

Fourth quarter

- (12:55) BGSU – Ta'ron Keith 2-yard run (Alan Anaya kick) (Drive: 12 plays, 75 yards, 7:05; Bowling Green 35-13)
- (07:36) KENT – Jaylen Thomaas 2-yard run (run failed) (Drive: 8 plays, 55 yards, 2:38; Bowling Green 35-19)
- (05:00) BGSU – Jaison Patterson 3-yard run (Alan Anaya kick) (Drive: 5 plays, 40 yards, 2:25; Bowling Green 42-19)
- (02:01) BGSU – Lucian Anderson III 1-yard run (Alan Anaya kick) (Drive: 5 plays, 15 yards, 1:17; Bowling Green 49-19)

Statistics	Bowling Green	Kent State
First downs	18	20
Plays–yards	476	358
Rushes–yards	39–190	32–74
Passing yards	286	284
Passing: comp–att–int	17–23–1	23–40–1
Turnovers		
Time of possession	30:29	29:31

Team	Category	Player	Statistics
Bowling Green	Passing	Connor Bazelak	13/19, 188 yards, 1 TD, 1 INT
Bowling Green	Rushing	Ta'ron Keith	9 carries, 103 yards, 1 TD
Bowling Green	Receiving	Ta'ron Keith	8 receptions, 130 yards, 1 TD
Kent State	Passing	Tommy Ulatowski	23/40, 284 yards, 2 TD, 1 INT
Kent State	Rushing	Jaylen Thomas	18 carries, 73 yards, 1 TD
Kent State	Receiving	Luke Floriea	9 receptions, 95 yards

=== Toledo ===
Game Eleven – Toledo Rockets (9-1) at Bowling Green Falcons (6-4) – Game summary

Quarter	1	2	3	4	Total
Toledo	7	3	7	15	32
Bowling Green	14	14	0	3	31

at Doyt Perry Stadium • Bowling Green, OH

- Date: Tuesday, November 14, 2023
- Game time: 7:00 p.m. EDT
- Game weather: Clear, 48 °F (9 °C) • Wind: S 6 mph (9.7 km/h)
- Game attendance: 20,590
- Referee: Billy Williams
- TV announcers (ESPN2): Rene Ingoglia & Jay Alter

Game information

First quarter

- (13:06) UT – Dequan Finn 23-yard run (Luke Pawlak kick) (Drive: 6 plays, 75 yards, 1:54; Toledo 7-0)
- (12:15) BGSU – Harold Fannin Jr. 56-yard pass from Connor Bazelak (Alan Anaya kick) (Drive: 2 plays, 75 yards, :45; Tied 7-7)
- (02:46) BGSU – Harold Fannin Jr. 2-yard pass from Camden Orth (Alan Anaya kick) (Drive: 8 plays, 51 yards, 4:17; Bowling Green 14-7)

Second quarter

- (14:55) UT – Luke Pawlak 39-yard field goal (Drive: 7 plays, 47 yards, 2:44; Bowling Green 14-10)
- (06:37) BGSU – Camden Orth 5-yard run (Alan Anaya kick) (Drive: 15 plays, 75 yards, 8:12; Bowling Green 21-10)
- (00:24) BGSU – Ta'ron Keith 1-yard run (Alan Anaya kick) (Drive: 12 plays, 62 yards, 4:25; Bowling Green 28-10)

Third quarter

- (13:06) UT – Junior Vandeross III 22-yard pass from Dequan Finn (Luke Pawlak kick) (Drive: 2 plays, 41 yards, :25; Bowling Green 28-17)

Fourth quarter

- (12:28) UT – Peny Boone 1-yard run (Anthony Torres pass from Dequan Finn) (Drive: 6 plays, 89 yards, 2:24; Bowling Green 28-25)
- (07:30) BGSU – Alan Anaya 40-yard field goal (Drive: 6 plays, 17 yards, 2:37; Bowling Green 31-25)
- (01:45) UT – Jacquez Stuart 59-yard pass from Dequan Finn (Luke Pawlak kick) (Drive: 7 plays, 77 yards, 2:51; Toledo 32-31)

Statistics	Toledo	Bowling Green
First downs	16	21
Plays–yards	57-415	81-404
Rushes–yards	27–136	35–95
Passing yards	279	309
Passing: comp–att–int	20–30–1	26-46-0
Turnovers		
Time of possession	23:01	36:59

Team	Category	Player	Statistics
Toledo	Passing	Dequan Finn	20/30, 279 yards, 2 TDS, 1 INT
Toledo	Rushing	Peny Boone	15 carries, 131 yards, 1 TD
Toledo	Receiving	Anthony Torres	3 receptions, 71 yards
Bowling Green	Passing	Connor Bazelak	23/35, 286 yards, 1 TD
Bowling Green	Rushing	Ta'ron Keith	15 carries, 64 yards, 1 TD
Bowling Green	Receiving	Harold Fannin Jr.	5 receptions, 89 yards, 2 TDS

=== At Western Michigan ===
Game Twelve – Bowling Green Falcons (6-5) at Western Michigan Broncos (4-7) – Game summary

Quarter	1	2	3	4	Total
Bowling Green	10	21	3	0	34
Western Michigan	0	3	0	7	10

at Waldo Stadium • Kalamazoo, MI

- Date: Tuesday, November 21, 2023
- Game time: 7:00 p.m. EDT
- Game weather: Cloudy, 40 °F (4 °C) • Wind: NW 9 mph (14 km/h)
- Game attendance: 8,901
- Referee: Greg Sujack
- TV announcers (ESPNU): Connor Onion, Aaron Murray

Game information

First quarter

- (12:04) BGSU – Alan Anaya 35-yard field goal (Drive: 7 plays, 58 yards, 2:56; Bowling Green 3-0)
- (10:55) BGSU – Jaylon Tillman 35-yard pass from Connor Bazelak (Alan Anaya kick) (Drive: 1 play, 34 yards, :07; Bowling Green 10-0)

Second quarter

- (13:54) BGSU – Jordan Oladokun 53-yard interception return (Alan Anaya kick) (Bowling Green 17-0)
- (07:12) BGSU – Odieu Hiliare 3-yard pass from Connor Bazelak (Drive: 5 plays, 43 yards, 2:21; Bowling Green 24-0)
- (00:57) BGSU – Ta'ron Keith 7-yard run (Drive: 9 plays, 68 yards, 4:28; Bowling Green 31-0)
- (00:00) WMU – Palmer Domschke 48-yard field goal (Drive: 8 plays, 45 yards, :57; Bowling Green 31-3)

Third quarter

- (08:59) BGSU – Alan Anaya 25-yard field goal (Drive: 9 plays, 26 yards, 3:55; Bowling Green 34-3)

Fourth quarter

- (04:44) WMU – Jalen Buckley 16-yard run (Palmer Domschke kick) (Drive:15 plays, 80 yards, 9:24; Bowling Green 34-10)

Statistics	Bowling Green	Western Michigan
First downs	21	16
Plays–yards	360	258
Rushes–yards	28–132	41–135
Passing yards	228	123
Passing: comp–att–int	19–28–1	17–27–2
Turnovers		
Time of possession	29:09	30:51

Team	Category	Player	Statistics
Bowling Green	Passing	Connor Bazelak	18/26, 217 yards, 2 TDS
Bowling Green	Rushing	Ta'ron Keith	13 carries, 66 yards, 1 TD
Bowling Green	Receiving	Harold Fannin Jr.	8 receptions, 99 yards
Western Michigan	Passing	Hayden Wolff	17/27, 123 yards, 2 INTS
Western Michigan	Rushing	Jalen Buckley	18 carries, 85 yards, 1 TD
Western Michigan	Receiving	Kenneth Womack	8 receptions, 44 yards

=== vs Minnesota ===
Game Thirteen – Bowling Green Falcons (7-5) vs. Minnesota Golden Gophers (5-7) – 2023 Quick Lane Bowl Game summary

Quarter	1	2	3	4	Total
Bowling Green	7	3	0	14	24
Minnesota	6	3	14	7	30

at Ford Field • Detroit, Michigan

- Date: Tuesday, December 26, 2023
- Game time: 2:00 p.m. EST
- Game weather: N/A (indoor stadium)
- Game attendance: 28,521
- Referee: Tim Rich
- TV announcers (ESPN): Connor Onion (play-by-play), Dustin Fox (analyst), and Tori Petry (sideline)
- Box score

Game information

First Quarter

- (13:47) BGSU – Odieu Hiliare 46-yard pass from Connor Bazelak, Alan Anaya kick (Drive: 3 plays, 75 yards, 1:13; Bowling Green 7–0)
- (05:56) MINN – Elijah Spencer 4-yard pass from Cole Kramer, two-point run conversion failed (Drive: 13 plays, 75 yards, 7:51; Bowling Green 7–6)

Second Quarter

- (08:57) MINN – Dragan Kesich 31-yard field goal (Drive: 7 plays, 42 yards, 2:58; Minnesota 9–7)
- (01:38) BGSU – Alan Anaya 33-yard field goal (Drive: 4 plays, 0 yards, 1:02; Bowling Green 10–9)

Third Quarter

- (09:20) MINN – Cole Kramer 1-yard run, Dragan Kesich kick (Drive: 11 plays, 78 yards, 5:40; Minnesota 16–10)
- (04:18) MINN – Jameson Geers 7-yard pass from Cole Kramer, Dragan Keisch kick (Drive: 6 plays, 27 yards, 3:31; Minnesota 23–10)

Fourth Quarter

- (11:10) BGSU – PaSean Wimberly 18-yard run, Alan Anaya kick (Drive: 7 plays, 80 yards, 3:29; Minnesota 23–17)
- (08:03) MINN – Darius Taylor 17-yard run, Dragan Kesich kick (Drive: 5 plays, 48 yards, 3:07; Minnesota 30–17)
- (02:33) BGSU – Connor Bazelak 2-yard run (Alan Anaya kick) Drive: 14 plays, 75 yards, 5:30; Minnesota 30–24)

Statistics	Bowling Green	Minnesota
First downs	18	19
Plays–yards	60–303	60–281
Rushes–yards	21–82	44–255
Passing yards	221	26
Passing: comp–att–int	22–39–0	8–16–1
Turnovers		
Time of possession	26:38	33:22

Team	Category	Player	Statistics
Bowling Green	Passing	Connor Bazelak	22/38, 221 yards, 1 TD
Bowling Green	Rushing	Pasean Wimberly	3 carries, 63 yards, 1 TD
Bowling Green	Receiving	Odieu Hiliare	10 receptions, 152 yards, 1 TD
Minnesota	Passing	Cole Kramer	8/16, 26 yards, 2 TD 1 INT
Minnesota	Rushing	Darius Taylor	35 carries, 208 yards, 1 TD
Minnesota	Receiving	Darius Taylor	2 receptions, 11 yards

== Statistics ==
Final Statistics through December 26, 2023

=== Individual Leaders ===
==== Passing ====
Passing statistics (Note: Fannin Jr. threw one incompletion)
NAME	GP	GS	Record	Cmp	Att	Pct	Yds	TD	Int	Rtg
Connor Bazelak	11	11	6–5	168	278	60.3	1,935	12	7	128.1
Camden Orth	12	2	1–1	39	68	57.4	486	5	5	126.9
Hayden Timosciek	2	0	0–0	6	10	60.0	33	0	2	47.7
Totals	13	13	7–6	213	357	59.7	2,454	17	14	125.3

==== Rushing ====
Rushing statistics
NAME	GP	Att	Yds	Avg	Lng	TD
Terion Stewart	9	125	762	6.1	54	8
Camden Orth	12	67	208	3.1	18	5
Taron Keith	12	66	390	5.9	40	4
Connor Bazelak	11	44	-82	-1.9	17	2
Jaison Patterson	13	35	128	3.7	20	1
Pasean Wimberly	13	22	124	5.6	42	1
Jamal Johnson	11	15	96	6.4	32	0
Harold Fannin Jr.	11	14	41	2.9	15	0
Nick Mosley	4	8	56	7.0	23	0
Lucian Anderson III	3	8	28	3.5	9	1
Hayden Timosciek	2	4	2	0.5	2	0
Abdul-Fatai Ibrahim	13	3	6	2.0	5	0
Trimaine Brown Jr.	4	2	6	3.0	4	0
Jhaylin Embry	13	2	5	2.5	5	0
Jackson Kleather	10	1	17	17.0	17	0
Odieu Hiliare	13	1	12	12.0	12	0
Chris Edmonds	2	1	5	5.0	5	0
Totals	13	429	1,788	4.2	54	22

==== Receiving ====
Receiving statistics
NAME	GP	Rec	Yds	Avg	Lng	TD
Odieu Hiliare	13	45	532	11.8	46	4
Harold Fannin Jr.	11	44	623	14.2	56	6
Taron Keith	12	44	457	10.4	58	3
Austin Osborne	13	29	302	10.4	42	0
Abdul-Fatai Ibrahim	13	20	220	11.0	33	2
Finn Hogan	10	11	163	14.8	50	1
Levi Gazarek	13	6	35	5.8	15	0
Jaison Patterson	13	4	23	5.8	17	0
Andrew Bench	13	3	20	6.7	10	0
Jamal Johnson	11	3	13	4.3	8	0
Jaylon Tillman	13	2	37	18.5	35	1
Terion Stewart	9	1	27	27.0	27	0
Jhaylin Embry	13	1	2	2.0	2	0
Totals	13	213	2,454	11.5	58	17

==== Special teams ====
Kicking statistics
NAME	GP	FGM	FGA	Pct	0–19	20–29	30–39	40–49	50+	Lng	XPM	XPA	Pct	Pts
Alan Anaya	13	13	18	72.2	0–0	4–4	6–8	3–5	0–1	42	43	43	100.0	82
Totals	13	13	18	72.2	0–0	4–4	6–8	3–5	0–1	42	43	43	100.0	82

Kickoff statistics
NAME	GP	Num	Yds	Avg	Lng	TB	OB
Jack Sauder	13	62	3,626	58.5	65	10	2
Jackson Kleather	10	3	127	42.3	57	0	0
Alan Anaya	13	2	125	62.5	65	0	0
Totals	13	67	3,878	57.9	65	10	2

Punting statistics
NAME	GP	Punts	Yds	Avg	Lng	TB	I–20	50+	FC	Blk
Jackson Kleather	10	33	1,296	39.3	63	2	13	1	11	0
Sami Sir	4	17	659	38.8	50	1	3	2	6	0
Totals	13	50	1,955	39.1	63	3	16	3	17	0

==== Returns ====
Punt return statistics
NAME	Ret	Yds	Avg	Lng	FC	TD
Jhaylin Embry	17	110	6.5	40	11	0
Pasean Wimberly	0	18	0.0	0	0	1
Totals	17	128	7.5	40	11	1

Kick return statistics
NAME	Ret	Yds	Avg	Lng	TD
Jhaylin Embry	12	249	20.8	58	0
Taron Keith	7	154	22.0	47	0
Jaison Patterson	2	42	21.0	25	0
Jaylon Tillman	1	14	14.0	14	0
Charles Rosser	1	3	3.0	3	0
Totals	23	462	20.1	58	0
