= 2023 Miami RedHawks football team =

American college football season

2023 Miami RedHawks football

MAC champion MAC East Division champions

MAC Championship, W 23–14 vs. Toledo

Cure Bowl, L 9–13 vs. Appalachian State
- Conference: Mid-American Conference
- East Division
- Record: 11–3 (7–1 MAC)
- Head coach: Chuck Martin (10th season)
- Offensive coordinator: Pat Welsh (1st season)
- Offensive scheme: Multiple
- Defensive coordinator: Bill Brechin (2nd season)
- Base defense: Multiple
- Home stadium: Yager Stadium

2023 Mid-American Conference football standings
	Conf.			Overall
Team	W		L	W		L
East Division
Miami (OH) xy$	7	–	1	11	–	3
Ohio	6	–	2	10	–	3
Bowling Green	5	–	3	7	–	6
Buffalo	3	–	5	3	–	9
Akron	1	–	7	2	–	10
Kent State	0	–	8	1	–	11
West Division
Toledo xy	8	–	0	11	–	3
Northern Illinois	5	–	3	7	–	6
Eastern Michigan	4	–	4	6	–	7
Central Michigan	3	–	5	5	–	7
Ball State	3	–	5	4	–	8
Western Michigan	3	–	5	4	–	8
Championship: Miami (OH) 23, Toledo 14
$ – Conference champion; x – Division champion/co-champions; y – Championship game participant

The 2023 Miami RedHawks football team represented Miami University as a member of the East Division of the Mid-American Conference (MAC) during the 2023 NCAA Division I FBS football season. They were led by tenth-year head coach Chuck Martin and played their home games at Yager Stadium in Oxford, Ohio. The Miami RedHawks football team drew an average home attendance of 13,395 in 2023.

Miami won the East division with a 7–1 conference record with their only loss coming against West champion Toledo. On October 21, during the regular season game between the division winners, Miami quarterback Brett Gabbert suffered a season ending leg injury. In spite of that, Miami won their first MAC Championship since 2019 with a 23–14 upset victory in the MAC Championship Game. They played Appalachian State in the Cure Bowl, who they lost 13–9.

== Transfer portal ==
=== Outgoing ===
Name	Pos.	New school
Tre'Von Morgan	WR	Unknown
Ja'Von Kimpson	CB	Unknown
Brett Gabbert	QB	Miami (OH)
Devon Dorsey	WR	Albany State
Darez Snider	RB	Unknown
Austin Robinson	WR	Unknown
Jeremiah Batiste	WR	Chattanooga
Ryan O'Hair	IOL	Robert Morris
John Saunders	CB	Ole Miss
Caleb Shaffer	IOL	Oklahoma
Deavon Pierce	S	Robert Morris
Tyre Shelton	RB	Louisiana Tech
Rusty Feth	IOL	Iowa
Rowan Zolman	S	Minnesota
Angelo Butts	WR	Missouri State
Joe Humphreys	QB	Murray State
Kamell Smith	QB	Unknown
Jeffrey Simmons	TE	Ball State

=== Incoming ===
Name	Pos.	Previous school
Rashad Amos	RB	South Carolina
Maddox Kopp	QB	Colorado
John Young	OT	Kentucky
Gage Larvadain	WR	Southeastern Louisiana
Joe Wilkins	WR	Notre Dame
Cade McDonald	WR	Michigan State
Jackson Kuwatch	LB	Ohio State

== Preseason ==
=== Preseason coaches poll ===
On July 20, the MAC announced the preseason coaches poll. Miami was picked to finish second in the East Division.

== Schedule ==
Date	Time	Opponent	Site	TV	Result	Attendance
September 1	7:00 p.m.	at Miami (FL)*	Hard Rock Stadium; Miami, FL (Confusion Bowl)	ACCN	L 3–38	49,024
September 9	3:30 p.m.	at UMass*	McGuirk Alumni Stadium; Amherst, MA	ESPN+	W 41–28	9,207
September 16	7:00 p.m.	at Cincinnati*	Nippert Stadium; Cincinnati, OH (Victory Bell)	ESPN+	W 31–24 ^{OT}	38,193
September 23	3:30 p.m.	Delaware State*	Yager Stadium; Oxford, OH	ESPN+	W 62–20	15,812
September 30	2:30 p.m.	at Kent State	Dix Stadium; Kent, OH	ESPN+	W 23–3	13,598
October 7	3:30 p.m.	Bowling Green	Yager Stadium; Oxford, OH	ESPN+	W 27–0	19,047
October 14	3:30 p.m.	at Western Michigan	Waldo Stadium; Kalamazoo, MI	ESPN+	W 34–21	20,039
October 21	4:00 p.m.	Toledo^{†}	Yager Stadium; Oxford, OH	ESPNU	L 17–21	17,321
October 28	3:30 p.m.	at Ohio	Peden Stadium; Athens, OH (Battle of the Bricks)	CBSSN	W 30–16	19,854
November 8	7:30 p.m.	Akron	Yager Stadium; Oxford, OH	ESPNU	W 19–0	7,233
November 15	7:00 p.m.	Buffalo	Yager Stadium; Oxford, OH	ESPN2	W 23–10	7,561
November 25	12:00 p.m.	at Ball State	Scheumann Stadium; Muncie, IN	CBSSN	W 17–15	8,054
December 2	12:00 p.m.	vs. No. 23 Toledo	Ford Field; Detroit, MI (MAC Championship Game)	ESPN	W 23–14	20,200
December 16	3:30 p.m.	vs. Appalachian State	FBC Mortgage Stadium; Orlando, FL (Cure Bowl)	ABC	L 9–13	11,121
*Non-conference game; ^{†}Homecoming; Rankings from AP Poll released prior to the game; All times are in Eastern time

== Game summaries ==
=== at Miami (FL) ===
Game One – Miami (OH) RedHawks (0–0) at #Miami Hurricanes (0–0)

Quarter	1	2	3	4	Total
RedHawks	0	3	0	0	3
Hurricanes	7	9	8	14	38

at Hard Rock Stadium • Miami Gardens, Florida

- Date: Friday, September 1, 2023
- Game time: 7:00 p.m. EST
- Game weather: Cloudy • Temperature: 86 °F (30 °C)
- TV announcers (ACCN): Jay Alter (play-by-play) and Rene Ingoglia (analyst)

Game information

First quarter

- (13:26) MIA – Colbie Young 44-yard pass from Tyler Van Dyke, Andres Borregales kick (Drive: 3 plays, 56 yards, 1:25; Miami 7–0)
- (4:02) MIA – Andres Borregales 34-yard field goal (Drive: 15 plays, 66 yards, 7:33; Miami 10–0)

Second quarter

- (2:33) MIA – Andres Borregales 32-yard field goal (Drive: 10 plays, 64 yards, 5:02; Miami 13–0)
- (0:58) M–OH – Graham Nicholson 48-yard field goal (Drive: 6 plays, 44 yards, 1:35; Miami 13–3)
- (0:00) MIA – Andres Borregales 43-yard field goal (Drive: 5 plays, 50 yards, 0:58; Miami 16–3)

Third quarter

- (11:09) MIA – Mark Fletcher Jr. 26-yard run, Xavier Restrepo–Tyler Van Dyke pass (Drive: 5 plays, 65 yards, 2:14; Miami 24–3)

Fourth quarter

- (13:43) MIA – Henry Parrish Jr. 12-yard run, Andres Borregales kick (Drive: 6 plays, 78 yards, 2:57; Miami 31–3)
- (4:29) MIA – Donald Chaney Jr. 20-yard run, Andres Borregales kick (Drive: 8 plays, 69 yards, 4:46; Miami 38–3)

Statistics	M–OH	MIA
First downs	9	26
Plays–yards	49–215	61–493
Rushes–yards	25–51	36–250
Passing yards	164	243
Passing: comp–att–int	13–24–0	20–25–1
Turnovers		
Time of possession	27:07	32:53

Team	Category	Player	Statistics
Miami (OH)	Passing	Brett Gabbert	12/21, 127 yards
Miami (OH)	Rushing	Rashad Amos	8 carries, 30 yards
Miami (OH)	Receiving	Gage Larvadain	8 receptions, 80 yards
Miami	Passing	Tyler Van Dyke	17/22, 201 yards, TD, INT
Miami	Rushing	Henry Parrish Jr.	9 carries, 90 yards, TD
Miami	Receiving	Colbie Young	4 receptions, 79 yards, TD

=== at UMass ===
Game Two – Miami (OH) RedHawks (0–1) at Umass Minutemen (1–1)

Quarter	1	2	3	4	Total
RedHawks	21	7	3	10	41
Minutemen	0	7	14	7	28

at Warren McGuirk Alumni Stadium • Hadley, Massachusetts

- Date: Saturday, September 9, 2023
- Game time: 3:30 p.m. EST
- Game weather: Cloudy • Temperature: 87 °F (31 °C) • Wind: S 7 MPH
- Game attendance: 9,207
- Referee: Charles Lamertina
- TV announcers (ESPN+): Jay Burnham, Andy Gresh, and Matt Goldstein

Game information

First quarter

- (13:14) M-OH – Gage Larvadain 26 Yd pass from Brett Gabbert, Kellan McLaughlin Kick (Drive: 4 plays, 75 yards, 1:46; Miami 7–0)
- (1:40) M-OH – Gage Larvadain 99 Yd pass from Brett Gabbert, Graham Nicholson Kick (Drive: 2 plays, 99 yards, 1:02; Miami 14–0)
- (1:17) M-OH – Kobe Hilton 0 Yd Fumble Return, Graham Nicholson Kick (Drive: 1 play, -14 yards, 0:10; Miami 21–0)

Second quarter

- (11:10) UMASS –Dashaun Jerkins 53 Yd Interception Return, Cameron Carson Kick (Drive: 6 plays, 28 yards, 3:37; Miami 21–7)
- (2:39) M-OH – Gage Larvadain 13 Yd pass from Brett Gabbert, Graham Nicholson Kick (Drive: 6 plays, 52 yards, 2:51; Miami 28–7)

Third quarter

- (10:20) UMASS –Greg Desrosiers Jr. 32 Yd pass from Carlos Davis, Cameron Carson Kick (Drive: 5 plays, 62 yards, 2:17; Miami 28–14)
- (2:51) UMASS –Mark Pope 50 Yd pass from Carlos Davis, Cameron Carson Kick (Drive: Miami 28–21)
- (0:12) M-OH – Graham Nicholson 33 Yd Field Goal (Drive: 7 plays, 44 yards, 2:32; Miami 31–21)

Fourth quarter

- (11:16) UMASS –George Johnson III 5 Yd pass from Carlos Davis, Cameron Carson Kick (Drive: 2 plays, 2 yards, 0:43; Miami 31–28)
- (10:57) M-OH – Cade McDonald 1 Yd pass from Brett Gabbert, Graham Nicholson Kick (Drive: 1 play, 70 yards, 0:11; Miami 38-28)
- (3:32) M-OH – Graham Nicholson 44 Yd Field Goal (Drive: 7 plays, 25 yards, 3:31; Miami 41–28)

Statistics	M–OH	UMass
First downs	17	18
Plays–yards	57-446	65-306
Rushes–yards	35-144	30-62
Passing yards	302	244
Passing: comp–att–int	22-35-1	12-22-2
Turnovers		
Time of possession	30:59	29:01

Team	Category	Player	Statistics
Miami (OH)	Passing	Brett Gabbert	12/22, 302 yards, 4 TD, 2 INT
Miami (OH)	Rushing	Rashad Amos	23 carries, 115 yards
Miami (OH)	Receiving	Gage Larvadain	8 receptions, 273 yards, 3 TD
UMass	Passing	Carlos Davis	22/32, 244 yards, 3 TD, INT
UMass	Rushing	Kay'Ron Lynch-Adams	15 carries, 57 yards
UMass	Receiving	Mark Pope	4 receptions, 70 yards, TD

=== at Cincinnati ===
Game Three – Miami (OH) Redhawks (1-1) at Cincinnati Bearcats (2-0)

Quarter	1	2	3	4	OT	Total
RedHawks	7	7	7	3	7	31
Bearcats	10	3	3	8	0	24

at Nippert Stadium • Cincinnati, Ohio

- Date: Saturday, September 16, 2023
- Game time: 7:00 p.m. EDT
- Game weather: Sunny • Temperature: 80 °F (27 °C) • Wind: 5 mph
- Game attendance: 38,193
- Referee: Matt Packowski
- TV announcers (ESPN+): Sean Kenney (play-by-play) and Brad Hopkins (analyst)

Game information

First quarter

- (14:45) M-OH - Gage Larvadain 79-yard pass from Brett Gabbert (Graham Nicholson kick) - 7-0 Miami (OH), Drive: 1 play, 79 yards, 0:11
- (11:47) CIN - Corey Kiner 4-yard run (Carter Brown kick) - 7-7, Drive: 6 plays, 75 yards, 2:58
- (1:40) CIN - Carter Brown 28-yard field goal - 10-7 Cincinnati, Drive: 11 plays, 72 yards, 4:48

Second quarter

- (9:22) M-OH - Javon Tracy 17-yard pass from Brett Gabbert (Graham Nicholson kick) - 14-10 Miami (OH), Drive: 12 plays, 69 yards, 7:12
- (1:52) CIN - Carter Brown 23-yard field goal - 14-13 Miami (OH), Drive: 16 plays, 79 yards, 7:23

Third quarter

- (7:23) CIN - Carter Brown 23-yard field goal - 16-14 Cincinnati, Drive: 11 plays, 62 yards, 4:21
- (3:01) M-OH - Kevin Davis 1-yard run (Graham Nicholson kick) - 21-16 Miami (OH), Drive: 9 plays, 75 yards, 4:22

Fourth quarter

- (13:52) CIN - Emory Jones 17-yard run (Emory Jones two-point pass to Chamon Metayer) - 24-21 Cincinnati, Drive: 11 plays, 75 yards, 4:09
- (5:10) M-OH - Graham Nicholson 20-yard field goal - 24-24, Drive: 7 plays, 88 yards, 3:09

Overtime

- (1OT) M-OH - Joe Wilkins Jr. 8-yard pass from Brett Gabbert (Graham Nicholson kick) - 31-24 Miami (OH), Drive: 2 plays, 25 yards

Statistics	MIA	CIN
First downs	16	30
Plays–yards	49-358	93-538
Rushes–yards	29-121	57-273
Passing yards	237	265
Passing: comp–att–int	12-20-1	18-34-2
Turnovers		
Time of possession	23:42	36:18

Team	Category	Player	Statistics
Miami (OH)	Passing	Brett Gabbert	12/20, 237 yards, 3 TD, 1 INT
Miami (OH)	Rushing	Brett Gabbert	9 carries, 75 yards
Miami (OH)	Receiving	Gage Larvadain	1 reception, 79 yards, 1 TD
Cincinnati	Passing	Emory Jones	18/34, 265 yards, 2 INT
Cincinnati	Rushing	Ryan Montgomery	20 carries, 104 yards
Cincinnati	Receiving	Xzavier Henderson	12 receptions, 140 yards

=== Bowling Green ===
Game Six – Bowling Green Falcons (2–3) at Miami RedHawks (4–1) – Game summary

Quarter	1	2	3	4	Total
Bowling Green	0	0	0	0	0
Miami (OH)	7	7	10	3	27

at Yager Stadium • Oxford, OH

- Date: Saturday, October 7, 2023
- Game time: 3:30 p.m. EDT
- Game weather: Cloudy, 60 °F (16 °C) • Wind: NW 14 mph (23 km/h)
- Game attendance: 19,047
- Referee: William Williams
- TV announcers (ESPN+): David Wilson, Marcus Ray

Game information

First quarter

- (03:29) MIA – Rashad Amos 1-yard run (Graham Nicholson kick) (Drive: 17 plays, 75 yards, 11:31; Miami 7-0)

Second quarter

- (00:52) MIA – Nate Muersch 2-yard pass from Brett Gabbert (Graham Nicholson kick) (Drive: 10 plays, 82 yards, 3:53; Miami 14-0)

Third quarter

- (03:33) MIA – Kenny Tracy 39-yard pass from Brett Gabbert (Graham Nicholson kick) (Drive: 9 plays, 72 yards, 5:17; Miami 21-0)
- (00:09) MIA – Graham Nicholson 52-yard field goal (Drive: 4 plays, 2 yards, 1:34; Miami 24-0)

Fourth quarter

- (03:21) MIA – Graham Nicholson 30-yard field goal (Drive: 13 plays, 51 yards, 9:54; Miami 27-0)

Statistics	Bowling Green	Miami
First downs	9	20
Plays–yards	135	356
Rushes–yards	19–63	47–186
Passing yards	72	170
Passing: comp–att–int	11–23–1	15–18–0
Turnovers		
Time of possession	20:31	39:29

Team	Category	Player	Statistics
Bowling Green	Passing	Connor Bazelak	8/17, 64 yards, 1 INT
Bowling Green	Rushing	Terion Stewart	8 carries, 63 yards
Bowling Green	Receiving	Odieu Hiliare	4 receptions, 27 yards
Miami	Passing	Brett Gabbert	15/18, 170 yards, 2 TDS
Miami	Rushing	Kenny Tracy	11 carries, 58 yards
Miami	Receiving	Joe Wilkins	6 receptions, 70 yards

=== at Ohio ===
Game Nine – Miami RedHawks (6–2) vs. Ohio Bobcats (6–2)

Quarter	1	2	3	4	Total
Miami	0	13	10	7	30
Ohio	9	0	0	7	16

at Peden Stadium • Athens, Ohio

- Date: Saturday, October 28, 2023
- Game time: 3:30 EDT
- Game weather: sunny
- Game attendance: 19,854
- Referee: David Siegle
- TV announcers (CBSSN): Jason Knapp, Malik Zaire
- Ohio notes, boxscore

Game information

First Quarter

- (09:57) OHIO - Sieh Bangura 2 yd Run (Gianni Spetic PAT blocked) 6 plays, 79 yards, TOP 03:04 (OHIO 6–0)
- (01:28) OHIO - Gianni Spetic 33 yd Field Goal 14 plays, 49 yards, TOP 06:35 (OHIO 9–0)

Second Quarter

- (12:11) M–OH - Graham Nicholson 26 yd Field Goal 4 plays, 2 yards, TOP 01:15 (OHIO 9–3)
- (04:20) M–OH - Graham Nicholson 40 yd Field Goal 9 plays, 36 yards, TOP 05:20 (OHIO 9–6)
- (01:21) M–OH - Rashad Amos 1 yd Run (Graham Nicholson Kick) 4 plays, 80 yards, TOP 01:24 (M–OH 13–9)

Third Quarter

- (11:22) M–OH - Graham Nicholson 32 yd Field Goal 4 plays, 5 yards, TOP 02:04 (M–OH 16–9)
- (01:21) M–OH - Aveon Smith 3 yd Run (Graham Nicholson Kick) 5 plays, 60 yards, TOP 02:21 (M–OH 23–9)

Fourth Quarter

- (11:13) M–OH - Kevin Davis 46 yd pass from Aveon Smith (Graham Nicholson Kick) 7 plays, 72 yards, TOP 03:58 (M–OH 30–9)
- (07:56) OHIO - Tyler Walton 1 Yd pass from Kurtis Rourke (Gianni Spetic Kick) 11 plays, 75 yards, TOP 03:17 (M–OH 30–16)

Statistics	Miami	Ohio
First downs	14	19
Total yards	291	363
Rushes/yards	45/188	26/50
Passing yards	103	313
Passing: Comp–Att–Int	7–11–0	25–39–0
Time of possession	32:19	27:41

Team	Category	Player	Statistics
Miami	Passing	Aveon Smith	7/11, 103 yards, 1 TD
Miami	Rushing	Rashad Amos	21 rushes, 163 yards, 1 TD
Miami	Receiving	Kevin Davis	3 receptions, 61 yards, 1 TD
Ohio	Passing	Kurtis Rourke	25/39, 313 yards, 1 TD
Ohio	Rushing	Sieh Bangura	9 rushes, 38 yards, 1 TD
Ohio	Receiving	Sam Wiglusz	5 receptions, 79 yards

=== Buffalo ===
Game Eleven – Buffalo Bulls (3–7) vs. Miami RedHawks (8–2) – Game summary

Quarter	1	2	3	4	Total
Bulls	0	3	7	0	10
RedHawks	0	10	3	10	23

at Fred C. Yager Stadium • Oxford, Ohio

- Date: November 15, 2023
- Game time: 7:05 p.m.
- Game weather: 54 °F (12 °C); Clear; Wind at SW3 MPH
- Game attendance: 7,561
- Referee: Greg Sujack
- TV announcers (ESPN2): Mike Corey (play-by-play) and Rocky Boiman (analyst)
- Boxscore

Game information

First quarter
Second quarter

- MIAMI – (8:45) Graham Nicholson 25-yard field goal (Drive: 5 plays, 36 yards, 1:34; Miami 3–0)
- MIAMI – (2:50) Rashad Amos 30-yard run, Graham Nicholson kick (Drive: 6 plays, 88 yards, 3:36; Miami 10–0)
- UB – (0:00) Alex McNulty 48-yard field goal (Drive: 11 plays, 47 yards, 2:46; Miami 10–3)

Third quarter

- MIAMI – (9:47) Graham Nicholson 37-yard field goal (Drive: 9 plays, 60 yards, 5:05; Miami 13–3)
- UB – (2:14) CJ Ogbonna 2-yard run, Alex McNulty kick (Drive: 13 plays, 75 yards, 7:33; Miami 13–10)

Fourth quarter

- MIAMI – (10:45) Rashad Amos 2-yard run, Graham Nicholson kick (Drive: 3 plays, 62 yards, 1:31; Miami 20–10)
- MIAMI – (3:11) Graham Nicholson 23-yard field goal (Drive: 11 plays, 40 yards, 5:44; Miami 23–10)

Statistics	UB	MIAMI
First downs	12	13
Plays–yards	61–278	52–326
Rushes–yards	44–131	36–180
Passing yards	147	146
Passing: comp–att–int	7–17–0	9–16–0
Turnovers		
Time of possession	30:08	29:52

Team	Category	Player	Statistics
Buffalo	Passing	Cole Snyder	6/14, 120 yards
Buffalo	Rushing	CJ Ogbonna	16 carries, 50 yards, TD
Buffalo	Receiving	Marlyn Johnson	1 reception, 80 yards
Miami	Passing	Aveon Smith	9/16, 146 yards
Miami	Rushing	Rashad Amos	15 carries, 82 yards, 2 TD
Miami	Receiving	Javon Tracy	5 receptions, 123 yards

=== vs. No. 23 Toledo (MAC Championship Game) ===
2023 MAC Championship Game
Miami RedHawks (10–2, 7–1) vs. Toledo Rockets (11–1, 8–0)

Quarter	1	2	3	4	Total
Miami	10	0	3	10	23
Toledo	0	8	6	0	14

at Ford Field • Detroit, MI

- Date: Saturday, December 2, 2023
- Game time: 12:00 p.m. EST
- Game weather: N/A (game played indoors)
- Game attendance: 20,200
- Referee: David Siegle
- TV announcers (ESPN): Anish Shroff, Andre Ware and Paul Carcaterra
- MAC Notes

Game information

First Quarter

- (11:40) M-OH – Graham Nicholson 33 yard field goal (Drive: 6 plays, 48 yards, 3:20; Miami 3–0)
- (0:46) M-OH – Rashad Amos 1 yard rush, Graham Nicholson kick (Drive: 6 plays, 39 yards, 3:26; Miami 10–0)

Second Quarter

- (0:09) TOL – Anthony Torres 13 yard pass from Dequan Finn, Dequan Finn pass to Anthony Torres for 2-PT conversion (Drive: 9 plays, 74 yards, 3:17; Miami 10–8)

Third Quarter

- (10:55) M-OH – Graham Nicholson 40 yard field goal (Drive: 5 plays, 33 yards, 3:01; Miami 13–8)
- (9:00) TOL – Dequan Finn 4 yard rush, Luke Pawlak kick failed (Drive: 4 plays, 75 yards, 1:55; Toledo 14–13)

Fourth Quarter

- (13:27) M-OH – Graham Nicholson 40 yard field goal (Drive: 9 plays, 26 yards, 4:06; Miami 16–14)
- (2:41) M-OH – Rashad Amos 10 yard rush, Graham Nicholson kick (Drive: 6 plays, 72 yards, 3:23; Miami 23–14)

Statistics	Miami	Toledo
First downs	14	17
Plays–Yards	59–306	65–370
Rushes/yards	43–197	29–97
Passing yards	109	273
Passing: Comp–Att–Int	6–16–0	18–36–1
Time of possession	34:03	25:57

Team	Category	Player	Statistics
Miami	Passing	Aveon Smith	6/16, 109 yards
Miami	Rushing	Aveon Smith	21 carries, 99 yards
Miami	Receiving	Luke Bolden	1 reception, 40 yards
Toledo	Passing	Dequan Finn	18/36, 273 yards, TD, INT
Toledo	Rushing	Peny Boone	11 carries, 41 yards
Toledo	Receiving	Junior Vandeross III	6 receptions, 106 yards

=== vs. Appalachian State (Cure Bowl) ===
2023 Avocados from Mexico Cure Bowl

Quarter	1	2	3	4	Total
Miami	3	0	6	0	9
Appalachian State	3	3	7	0	13

at FBC Mortgage Stadium • Orlando, Florida

- Date: Saturday, December 16, 2023
- Game time: 3:30 p.m. EST
- Game weather: Heavy rain • Temperature: 68 °F (20 °C)
- Game attendance: 11,121
- Referee: Rory Bernard
- TV announcers (ABC): Bob Wischusen (play-by-play), Robert Griffin III (analyst), and Kris Budden (sideline)
- Box score

Game information

First Quarter

- (12:50) M-OH – Graham Nicholson 34 yard field goal (Drive: 5 plays, 24 yards, 1:59; Miami 3–0)
- (9:31) APPST – Michael Hughes 29 yard field goal (Drive: 9 plays, 71 yards, 3:19; Tied 3–3)

Second Quarter

- (13:14) APPST – Michael Hughes 22 yard field goal (Drive: 13 plays, 88 yards, 5:55; Appalachian State 6–3)

Third Quarter

- (4:46) APPST – Joey Aguilar 9 yard run, Michael Hughes kick (Drive: 11 plays, 73 yards, 5:42; Appalachian State 13–3)
- (2:05) M-OH – Rashad Amos 23 yard run, Graham Nicholson kick no good (Drive: 1 play, 23 yards, 0:06; Appalachian State 13–9)

Fourth Quarter

No scoring

=== Statistics ===
Statistics	MIA	APP
First downs	11	22
Plays–yards	52–227	73–388
Rushes–yards	42–183	41–177
Passing yards	44	211
Passing: comp–att–int	6–10–0	18–32–1
Turnovers		
Time of possession	28:21	31:39

Team	Category	Player	Statistics
Miami	Passing	Maddox Kopp	1/2, 28 yards
Miami	Rushing	Rashad Amos	33 carries, 180 yards, TD
Miami	Receiving	Gage Larvadain	4 receptions, 36 yards
Appalachian State	Passing	Joey Aguilar	18/32, 211 yards, INT
Appalachian State	Rushing	Anderson Castle	20 carries, 119 yards
Appalachian State	Receiving	Kaedin Robinson	8 receptions, 118 yards

== Awards and honors ==
=== Individual yearly awards ===
National awards
Award	Player	Position
Lou Groza Award	Graham Nicholson	PK
Ray Guy Award Semifinalist	Alec Bevelhimer	P

MAC individual awards
Player	Position	Award
Graham Nicholson	PK	Special Teams Player of the Year
Matt Salopek	LB	Defensive Player of the Year

=== Weekly individual awards ===
MAC weekly honors
Award	Player	Position	Award
Week 1	Alec Bevelhimer	P	Special Teams Player of the Week
Week 3	Alec Bevelhimer	P	Special Teams Player of the Week
Week 12	Michael Dowell	DB	Defensive Player of the Week
Week 2	Brett Gabbert	QB	Offensive Player of the Week
Week 3	Brett Gabbert	QB	Offensive Player of the Week
Week 7	Brett Gabbert	QB	Offensive Player of the Week
Week 2	Gage Larvadain	WR	Offensive Player of the Week
Week 2	Graham Nicholson	PK	Special Teams Player of the Week
Week 4	Graham Nicholson	PK	Special Teams Player of the Week
Week 7	Graham Nicholson	PK	Special Teams Player of the Week
Week 9/10	Graham Nicholson	PK	Special Teams Player of the Week
Week 11	Graham Nicholson	PK	Special Teams Player of the Week
Week 12	Graham Nicholson	PK	Special Teams Player of the Week
Week 3	Matt Salopek	LB	Defensive Co-Player of the Week
Week 9/10	Matt Salopek	LB	Defensive Player of the Week

=== All-Americans ===
All-MAC
Player	Position	1st/2nd/3rd Team
Rashad Amos	RB	3rd team
Alec Bevelhimer	P	2nd team
Brett Gabbert	QB	3rd team
Reid Holskey	OL	2nd team
Will Jados	OL	2nd team
Cade McDonald	RS	2nd team
Graham Nicholson	PK	1st team
Matt Salopek	LB	1st team
Brian Ugwu	DL	2nd team
Caiden Woullard	DL	1st team

CBS Sports / 247Sports
Player	Position	1st/2nd team
Graham Nicholson	PK	1st team

AP
Player	Position	1st/2nd team
Graham Nicholson	PK	1st team

Walter Camp
Player	Position	1st/2nd team
Graham Nicholson	PK	1st team

NCAA Recognized All-American Honors
Player	AFCA	FWAA	TSN	Designation
Graham Nicholson (PK)		2nd team		Consensus
The NCAA recognizes a selection to all five of the AFCA, FWAA and TSN first teams for unanimous selections and three of five for consensus selections. HM = Honorable mention. Source:

Other All-American Honors
Player	Athletic	Athlon	BR	CFN	ESPN	FOX Sports	Phil Steele	SI	USA Today
Graham Nicholson (PK)	1st team			1st team				1st team	1st team
