= 2023 Buffalo Bulls football team =

American college football season

2023 Buffalo Bulls football
- Conference: Mid-American Conference
- East Division
- Record: 3–9 (3–5 MAC)
- Head coach: Maurice Linguist (3rd season)
- Offensive coordinator: DJ Mangas (1st season)
- Offensive scheme: Multiple
- Defensive coordinator: Robert Wright (1st season)
- Base defense: 4–3
- Captain: Game captains
- Home stadium: University at Buffalo Stadium

2023 Mid-American Conference football standings
	Conf.			Overall
Team	W		L	W		L
East Division
Miami (OH) xy$	7	–	1	11	–	3
Ohio	6	–	2	10	–	3
Bowling Green	5	–	3	7	–	6
Buffalo	3	–	5	3	–	9
Akron	1	–	7	2	–	10
Kent State	0	–	8	1	–	11
West Division
Toledo xy	8	–	0	11	–	3
Northern Illinois	5	–	3	7	–	6
Eastern Michigan	4	–	4	6	–	7
Central Michigan	3	–	5	5	–	7
Ball State	3	–	5	4	–	8
Western Michigan	3	–	5	4	–	8
Championship: Miami (OH) 23, Toledo 14
$ – Conference champion; x – Division champion/co-champions; y – Championship game participant

The 2023 Buffalo Bulls football team represented the University at Buffalo as a member of the Mid-American Conference (MAC) during the 2023 NCAA Division I FBS football season. Led by Maurice Linguist in his third and final season as head coach, the Bulls compiled an overall record of 3–9 with a mark of 3–5 in conference play, placing fourth in the MAC's East Division. The team played home games at University at Buffalo Stadium in Amherst, New York.

Buffalo drew an average home attendance of 13,142 in 2023.

== Schedule ==
Date	Time	Opponent	Site	TV	Result	Attendance
September 2	3:30 p.m.	at No. 19 Wisconsin*	Camp Randall Stadium; Madison, WI	FS1	L 17–38	76,224
September 9	6:00 p.m.	Fordham*	University at Buffalo Stadium; Amherst, NY	ESPN+	L 37–40	15,854
September 16	12:00 p.m.	Liberty*	University at Buffalo Stadium; Amherst, NY	CBSSN	L 27–55	13,020
September 23	7:30 p.m.	at Louisiana*	Cajun Field; Lafayette, LA	ESPN+	L 38–45	17,674
September 30	12:00 p.m.	at Akron	InfoCision Stadium–Summa Field; Akron, OH	ESPN+	W 13–10 ^{OT}	5,490
October 7	2:00 p.m.	Central Michigan	University at Buffalo Stadium; Amherst, NY	ESPN+	W 37–13	12,093
October 14	3:30 p.m.	Bowling Green^{†}	University at Buffalo Stadium; Amherst, NY	ESPN+	L 14–24	15,196
October 21	3:30 p.m.	at Kent State	Dix Stadium; Kent, OH	ESPN+	W 24–6	11,735
October 31	7:30 p.m.	at Toledo	Glass Bowl; Toledo, OH	ESPN2	L 13–31	14,939
November 7	7:30 p.m.	Ohio	University at Buffalo Stadium; Amherst, NY	ESPN2	L 10–20	11,444
November 15	7:00 p.m.	at Miami (OH)	Yager Stadium; Oxford, OH	ESPN2	L 10–23	7,561
November 21	7:30 p.m.	Eastern Michigan	University at Buffalo Stadium; Amherst, NY	ESPN2	L 11–24	11,243
*Non-conference game; ^{†}Homecoming; Rankings from AP Poll released prior to the game; All times are in Eastern time

== Preseason ==
=== Preseason coaches poll ===
On July 20, the MAC announced the preseason coaches poll. Buffalo was picked to finish third in the East Division and received one vote to win conference.

== Game summaries ==
=== at No. 19 Wisconsin ===
Buffalo vs. No. 19 Wisconsin – Game summary

Quarter	1	2	3	4	Total
Bulls	7	3	0	7	17
No. 19 Badgers	7	7	14	10	38

at Camp Randall Stadium • Madison, Wisconsin

- Date: September 2, 2023
- Game time: 2:30 p.m.
- Game weather: 88 °F (31 °C); Sunny; Wind at S13 MPH
- Game attendance: 76,224
- Referee: Kole Knueppel
- TV announcers (FS1): Eric Collins (play-by-play) and Devin Gardner (analyst)
- Box score

Game information

First quarter

- WISC – (7:16) Chez Mellusi 1-yard run, Nathanial Vakos kick (Drive: 11 plays, 73 yards, 3:53; Wisconsin 7–0)
- UB – (5:07) Cole Harrity 7-yard pass from Cole Snyder, Alex McNulty kick (Drive: 5 plays, 65 yards, 2:09; Tied 7–7)

Second quarter

- WISC – (1:00) Chimere Dike 29-yard pass from Tanner Mordecai, Nathanial Vakos kick (Drive: 6 plays, 55 yards, 2:08; Wisconsin 14–7)
- UB – (0:07) Alex McNulty 53-yard field goal (Drive: 7 plays, 40 yards, 0:53; Wisconsin 14–10)

Third quarter

- WISC – (8:28) Chez Mellusi 89-yard run, Nathanial Vakos kick (Drive: 1 plays, 89 yards, 0:15; Wisconsin 21–10)
- WISC – (2:37) Braelon Allen 6-yard run, Nathanial Vakos kick (Drive: 8 plays, 97 yards, 3:13; Wisconsin 28–10)

Fourth quarter

- WISC – (13:45) Nathanial Vakos 37-yard field goal (Drive: 6 plays, 31 yards, 2:56; Wisconsin 31–10)
- UB – (7:43) Cole Harrity 3-yard pass from Cole Snyder, Alex McNulty kick (Drive: 3 plays, 11 yards, 0:40; Wisconsin 31–17)
- WISC – (6:38) Braelon Allen 22-yard run, Nathanial Vakos kick (Drive: 3 plays, 46 yards, 1:05; Wisconsin 38–17)

After a strong first half showing by the Bulls where they played Wisconsin down to the wire, the Badgers pulled away and routed the Bulls 38-17.

Statistics	UB	WISC
First downs	14	23
Plays–yards	71–316	71–503
Rushes–yards	30–122	40–314
Passing yards	194	184
Passing: comp–att–int	26–41–0	24–31–2
Turnovers		
Time of possession	27:24	30:26

Team	Category	Player	Statistics
Buffalo	Passing	Cole Snyder	26/41, 194 yards, 2 TD
Buffalo	Rushing	Mike Washington	12 carries, 52 yards
Buffalo	Receiving	Darrell Harding, Jr.	1 reception, 51 yards
Wisconsin	Passing	Tanner Mordecai	24/31, 189 yards, 1 TD, 2 INT
Wisconsin	Rushing	Chez Mellusi	13 carries, 157 yards, 2 TD
Wisconsin	Receiving	Will Pauling	5 receptions, 55 yards

=== Fordham ===
Buffalo (0–1) vs. Fordham (FCS) (1–1) – Game summary

Quarter	1	2	3	4	Total
Rams	3	17	6	14	40
Bulls	14	7	9	7	37

at University at Buffalo Stadium • Amherst, New York

- Date: September 9, 2023
- Game time: 6:00 p.m.
- Game weather: 69 °F (21 °C); Cloudy; Wind at NE5 MPH
- Game attendance: 15,854
- Referee: Rich Edwards
- TV announcers (ESPN+): Robert Lee (play-by-play) and Stan Lewter (analyst)
- Box score

Game information

First quarter

- UB – (10:47) Mike Washington 1-yard run, Alex McNulty kick (Drive: 9 plays, 72 yards, 4:07; Buffalo 7–0)
- UB – (10:06) Marlyn Johnson 22-yard pass from Cole Snyder, Alex McNulty kick (Drive: 1 plays, 22 yards, 0:05; Buffalo 14–0)
- FOR – (3:40) Brandon Peskin 38-yard field goal (Drive: 13 plays, 55 yards, 6:26; Buffalo 14–3)

Second quarter

- UB – (14:16) Darrell Harding Jr. 15-yard pass from Cole Snyder, Alex McNulty kick (Drive: 7 plays, 68 yards, 4:18; Buffalo 21–3)
- FOR – (11:10) Mekai Felton 9-yard pass from C. J. Montes, Brandon Peskin kick (Drive: 7 plays, 89 yards, 3:01; Buffalo 21–10)
- FOR – (1:53) Mekai Felton 12-yard pass from C. J. Montes, Brandon Peskin kick (Drive: 13 plays, 97 yards, 5:32; Buffalo 21–17)
- FOR – (0:15) Brandon Peskin 44-yard field goal (Drive: 7 plays, 34 yards, 1:18; Buffalo 21–20)

Third quarter

- FOR – (7:33) Julius Loughridge 9-yard pass from C. J. Montes (blocked PAT) (Drive: 3 plays, 11 yards, 1:07; Fordham 26–21)
- UB – (7:33) Clevester Hines III 75-yard PAT return; Fordham 26–23
- UB – (3:13) Mike Washington 5-yard run, Alex McNulty kick (Drive: 10 plays, 75 yards, 4:20; Buffalo 30–26)

Fourth quarter

- FOR – (12:46) Garrett Cody 2-yard pass from C. J. Montes, Brandon Peskin kick (Drive: 11 plays, 86 yards, 5:23; Fordham 33–30)
- UB – (8:03) Marlyn Johnson 36-yard pass from Cole Snyder, Alex McNulty kick (Drive: 9 plays, 75 yards, 4:43; Buffalo 37–33)
- FOR – (2:32) M. J. Wright 15-yard pass from C. J. Montes, Brandon Peskin kick (Drive: 12 plays, 75 yards, 5:31; Fordham 40–37)

Statistics	FOR	UB
First downs	27	23
Plays–yards	79–459	60–362
Rushes–yards	43–150	30–97
Passing yards	309	265
Passing: comp–att–int	23–36–0	24–30–0
Turnovers		
Time of possession	34:10	25:36

Team	Category	Player	Statistics
Fordham	Passing	C. J. Montes	23/36, 309 yards, 5 TD
Fordham	Rushing	Julius Loughridge	20 carries, 106 yards
Fordham	Receiving	MJ Wright	7 receptions, 159 yards, 1 TD
Buffalo	Passing	Cole Snyder	24/30, 265 yards, 3 TD
Buffalo	Rushing	Mike Washington	13 carries, 57 yards, 2 TD
Buffalo	Receiving	Marlyn Johnson	7 receptions, 105 yards, 2 TD

=== Liberty ===
Liberty (2–0) vs. Buffalo (0–2) – Game summary

Quarter	1	2	3	4	Total
Flames	10	14	17	14	55
Bulls	0	14	7	6	27

at University at Buffalo Stadium • Amherst, New York

- Date: September 16, 2023
- Game time: 12 p.m. EDT
- Game weather: 69 °F (21 °C); Sunny
- Game attendance: 13,020
- Referee: Greg Sujack
- TV announcers (CBSSN): Jason Knapp (play-by-play); Malik Zaire (analyst)
- Boxscore

Game information

First quarter

- (11:18) LIB – Nick Brown 39-yard field goal (Drive: 9 plays, 52 yards, 3:38; Liberty 3–0)
- (5:43) LIB – Treon Sibley 56-yard pass from Kaidon Salter (Nick Brown kick) (Drive: 3 plays, 67 yards, 1:13; Liberty 10–0)

Second quarter

- (11:03) LIB – Elijah Smoot 42-yard pass from Kaidon Salter (Nick Brown kick) (Drive: 6 plays, 85 yards, 2:50; Liberty 17–0)
- (8:33) LIB – Kaidon Salter 1-yard run (Nick Brown kick) (Drive: 4 plays, 27 yards, 1:47; Liberty 24–0)
- (5:38) UB – Darrell Harding Jr. 7-yard pass from Cole Snyder (Alex McNulty kick) (Drive: 8 plays, 75 yards, 2:55; Liberty 24–7)
- (0:28) UB – Nik McMillan 33-yard pass from Cole Snyder (Alex McNulty kick) (Drive: 8 plays, 89 yards, 1:13; Liberty 24–14)

Third quarter

- (12:13) LIB – Nick Brown 35-yard field goal (Drive: 4 plays, 1 yards, 1:24; Liberty 27–14)
- (8:40) LIB – Elijah Smoot 33-yard pass from Kaidon Salter (Nick Brown kick) (Drive: 2 plays, 42 yards, 1:00; Liberty 34–14)
- (4:20) UB – Ron Cook 2-yard pass from Cole Snyder (Alex McNulty kick) (Drive: 10 plays, 77 yards, 4:18; Liberty 34–21)
- (3:25) LIB – C.J. Daniels 75-yard pass from Kaidon Salter (Nick Brown kick) (Drive: 3 plays, 75 yards, 0:55; Liberty 41–21)

Fourth quarter

- (14:57) LIB – Austin Henderson 3-yard pass from Kaidon Salter (Nick Brown kick) (Drive: 3 plays, 31 yards, 1:31; Liberty 48–21)
- (10:14) UB – Marlyn Johnson 3-yard pass from Cole Snyder (2-pt conversion failed) (Drive: 10 plays, 75 yards, 4:43; Liberty 48–27)
- (6:24) LIB – Aaron Bedgood 49-yard run (Nick Brown kick) (Drive: 1 plays, 49 yards, 0:10; Liberty 55–27)

Statistics	LIB	UB
First downs	20	22
Plays–yards	65–569	81–363
Rushes–yards	36–225	30–87
Passing yards	344	276
Passing: comp–att–int	16–29–0	29–51–2
Turnovers		
Time of possession	28:35	31:25

Team	Category	Player	Statistics
Liberty	Passing	Kaidon Salter	16/26, 344 yards, TD
Liberty	Rushing	Kaidon Salter	10 carries, 66 yards, TD
Liberty	Receiving	Treon Sibler	3 receptions, 106 yards, TD
Buffalo	Passing	Cole Snyder	29/51, 276 yards, 4 TD, 2 INT
Buffalo	Rushing	Mike Washington	11 carries, 37 yards
Buffalo	Receiving	Nik McMillan	4 receptions, 72 yards, TD

=== at Louisiana ===
Buffalo (0–3) vs. Louisiana (2–1) – Game summary

Quarter	1	2	3	4	Total
Bulls	0	0	21	17	38
Ragin' Cajuns	7	3	21	14	45

at Cajun Field • Lafayette, Louisiana

- Date: September 23, 2023
- Game time: 7:30 p.m.
- Game weather: 93 °F (34 °C); Cloudy; Wind at SW5 MPH
- Game attendance: 17,674
- Referee: Jeremy Parker
- TV announcers (ESPN+): Dan McDonald (play-by-play) and Eric Mouton (analyst)
- Boxscore

Game information

First quarter

- (2:57) LA – Neal Johnson 8-yard pass from Zeon Chriss (Kenneth Almendares kick) (Drive: 7 plays, 49 yards, 2:56; Louisiana 7–0)

Second quarter

- (4:08) LA – Nick Brown 39-yard field goal (Drive: 9 plays, 52 yards, 3:38; Louisiana 10–0)

Third quarter

- (12:05) LA – Zeon Chriss 54-yard rush (Kenneth Almendares kick) (Drive: 4 plays, 64 yards, 1:35; Louisiana 17–0)
- (9:25) UB – CJ Ogbonna 4-yard rush (Alex McNulty kick) (Drive: 6 plays, 70 yards, 2:30; Louisiana 17–7)
- (8:20) LA – Jacob Kibodi 69-yard rush (Kenneth Almendares kick) (Drive: 3 plays, 75 yards, 1:23; Louisiana 24–7)
- (6:30) LA – Patrick Mensah 24-yard interception returned (Kenneth Almendares kick) (Drive: 3 plays, 7 yards, 1:24; Louisiana 31–7)
- (3:06) UB – Ron Cook Jr. 4-yard rush (two-point rush conversion attempt failed) (Drive: 5 plays, 18 yards, 2:26; Louisiana 31–13)
- (0:47) UB – Ron Cook Jr. 12-yard rush (Ron Cook Jr. two-point conversion rush) (Drive: 2 plays, 13 yards, 0:50; Louisiana 31–21)

Fourth quarter

- (13:46) LA – Zeon Chriss 1-yard rush (Kenneth Almendares kick) (Drive: 6 plays, 75 yards, 2:01; Louisiana 38–21)
- (10:42) UB – Alex McNulty 47-yard field goal (Drive: 7 plays, 47 yards, 3:04; Louisiana 38–24)
- (7:40) LA – Jacob Kibodi 20-yard rush (Kenneth Almendares kick) (Drive: 7 plays, 75 yards, 3:02; Louisiana 45–24)
- (4:32) UB – Marlyn Johnson 12-yard pass from Cole Snyder (Alex McNulty kick) (Drive: 10 plays, 65 yards, 3:08; Louisiana 45–31)
- (2:00) UB – Jacqez Barksdale 1-yard rush (Alex McNulty kick) (Drive: 8 plays, 57 yards, 2:31; Louisiana 45–38)

Statistics	UB	ULL
First downs	19	24
Plays–yards	79–373	67–518
Rushes–yards	44–178	38–269
Passing yards	195	249
Passing: comp–att–int	18–35–2	22–29–2
Turnovers		
Time of possession	33:21	26:39

Team	Category	Player	Statistics
Buffalo	Passing	Cole Snyder	17/34, 198 yards, 1 TD, 2 INT
Buffalo	Rushing	Mike Washington	13 carries, 88 yards
Buffalo	Receiving	Cameron Ball	2 receptions, 51 yards
Louisiana	Passing	Zeon Chriss	22/29, 249 yards, 1 TD, 2 INT
Louisiana	Rushing	Dre'lyn Washington	13 carries, 103 yards
Louisiana	Receiving	Charles Robertson	4 receptions, 58 yards

=== at Akron ===
Buffalo (0–4) vs. Akron (1–3) – Game summary

Quarter	1	2	3	4	OT	Total
Bulls	0	7	3	0	3	13
Zips	7	3	0	0	0	10

at InfoCision Stadium–Summa Field • Akron, Ohio

- Date: September 30, 2023
- Game time: Noon
- Game weather: 71 °F (22 °C); Sunny; Wind at SW5 MPH
- Game attendance: 5,490
- Referee: Andrew Speciale
- TV announcers (ESPN+): Connor Onion (play-by-play), Adam Breneman (analyst) and Dannie Rogers (sideline)
- Boxscore

Game information

First quarter

- AKR – (0:38) Drake Anderson 1-yard pass from DJ Irons, Owen Wiley kick (Drive: 12 plays, 97 yards, 5:42; Akron 7–0)

Second quarter

- UB – (6:21) Boobie Curry 9-yard pass from Cole Snyder, Alex McNulty kick (Drive: 16 plays, 79 yards, 9:09; Tied 7–7)
- AKR – (0:21) Owen Wiley 38-yard field goal (Drive: 12 plays, 55 yards, 6:00; Akron 10–7)

Third quarter

- UB – (3:30) Alex McNulty 43-yard field goal (Drive: 16 plays, 46 yards, 7:41; Tied 10–10)

Fourth quarter
Overtime

- UB – Alex McNulty 42-yard field goal (Drive: 4 plays, 1 yard; Buffalo 13–10)

Statistics	UB	AKR
First downs	16	15
Plays–yards	68–248	52–258
Rushes–yards	34–106	25–122
Passing yards	142	136
Passing: comp–att–int	20–34–0	19–27–0
Turnovers		
Time of possession	33:22	26:38

Team	Category	Player	Statistics
Buffalo	Passing	Cole Snyder	19/34, 142 yards, 1 TD
Buffalo	Rushing	Ron Cook	17 carries, 62 yards
Buffalo	Receiving	Chance Morrow	2 receptions, 45 yards
Akron	Passing	DJ Irons	19/26, 136 yards, 1 TD
Akron	Rushing	DJ Irons	16 carries, 100 yards
Akron	Receiving	Myles Walker	4 receptions, 40 yards

=== Central Michigan ===
Buffalo (1–4) vs. Central Michigan (3–2) – Game summary

Quarter	1	2	3	4	Total
Chippewas	0	7	0	6	13
Bulls	10	13	14	0	37

at University at Buffalo Stadium • Amherst, New York

- Date: October 7, 2023
- Game time: 2:00 p.m.
- Game weather: 55 °F (13 °C); Cloudy; Wind at SW12 MPH
- Game attendance: 12,093
- Referee: Rich Edwards
- TV: ESPN+
- Boxscore

Game information

First quarter

- (12:15) BUF - Devin Grant 29 Yd Interception Return, Alex McNulty Kick (Drive: 3 plays, 76 yards, 0:47; Buffalo 7-0)
- (3:10) BUF - Alex McNulty 19 Yd Field Goal (Drive: 9 plays, 61 yards, 3:46; Buffalo 10-0)

Second quarter

- (10:57) CMU - Jesse Prewitt III 2 Yd pass from Jase Bauer, Tristan Mattson Kick (Drive: 18 plays, 75 yards, 7:13; Buffalo 10-7)
- (5:00) BUF - Alex McNulty 44 Yd Field Goal (Drive: 13 plays, 50 yards, 5:48; Buffalo 13-7)
- (1:48) BUF - Ron Cook Jr. 3 Yd Run, Alex McNulty Kick (Drive: 5 plays, 43 yards, 2:28; Buffalo 20-7)
- (0:00) BUF - Alex McNulty 48 Yd Field Goal (Drive: 5 plays, 18 yards, 1:05; Buffalo 23-7)

Third quarter

- (13:16) BUF - Devin Grant 58 Yd Interception Return, Alex McNulty Kick (Drive: 4 plays, 75 yards, 1:44; Buffalo 30-7)
- (9:19) BUF - Ron Cook Jr. 1 Yd Run, Alex McNulty Kick (Drive: 6 plays, 47 yards, 1:56; Buffalo 37-7)

Fourth quarter

- (2:43) CMU - Tyson Davis 5 Yd pass from Jase Bauer, Two-Point Pass Conversion Failed (Drive: 10 plays, 80 yards, 3:38; Buffalo 37-13)

Statistics	CMU	UB
First downs	21	18
Plays–yards	74–360	67–355
Rushes–yards	25–80	35–123
Passing yards	280	232
Passing: comp–att–int	28–49–3	20–32–0
Turnovers		
Time of possession	27:43	32:17

Team	Category	Player	Statistics
Central Michigan	Passing	Jase Bauer	28/49, 280 yards, 2 TD, 3 INT
Central Michigan	Rushing	Jase Bauer	6 carries, 31 yards
Central Michigan	Receiving	Marion Lukes	7 receptions, 73 yards
Buffalo	Passing	Cole Snyder	20/32, 232 yards
Buffalo	Rushing	Ron Cook	11 carries, 53 yards, 2 TD
Buffalo	Receiving	Boobie Curry	4 receptions, 74 yards

=== Bowling Green ===
Buffalo (2–4) vs. Bowling Green (2–4) – Game summary

Quarter	1	2	3	4	Total
Falcons	10	14	0	0	24
Bulls	7	0	7	0	14

at University at Buffalo Stadium • Amherst, New York

- Date: October 14, 2023
- Game time: 3:30 p.m.
- Game weather: 51 °F (11 °C); Rain; Wind at SW8 MPH
- Game attendance: 15,196
- Referee: David Siegle
- TV announcers (ESPN+): Doug Sherman, Je'Rod Cherry
- Boxscore

Game information

First quarter

- (07:38) BUFF – Cole Snyder 10-yard run (Alex McNulty kick) (Drive: 3 plays, 33 yards, 1:30; Buffalo 7-0)
- (02:42) BGSU – Alan Anaya 23-yard field goal (Drive: 9 plays, 70 yards, 4:56; Buffalo 7-3)
- (00:25) BGSU – Camden Orth 1-yard run (Alan Anaya kick) (Drive: 3 plays, 9 yards, 1:23; Bowling Green 10-7)

Second quarter

- (05:23) BGSU – Ta'ron Keith 3-yard pass from Camden Orth (Alan Anaya kick) (Drive: 13 plays, 86 yards, 8:06; Bowling Green 17-7)
- (02:20) BGSU – PeSean Wimberly 18-yard blocked punt return (Alan Anaya kick) (Bowling Green 24-7)

Third quarter

- (03:02) BUFF – Darrell Harding Jr. 24-yard pass from CJ Ogbonna (Alex McNulty kick) (Drive: 8 plays, 74 yards, 4:33; Bowling Green 24-14)

Fourth quarter

No scoring plays

Statistics	BGSU	UB
First downs	13	18
Plays–yards	59–295	66–238
Rushes–yards	43–218	37–167
Passing yards	77	71
Passing: comp–att–int	9–16–2	9–29–4
Turnovers		
Time of possession	33:28	26:32

Team	Category	Player	Statistics
Bowling Green	Passing	Camden Orth	9/16, 77 yards, TD, 2 INT
Bowling Green	Rushing	Terion Stewart	25 carries, 123 yards
Bowling Green	Receiving	Austin Osborne	3 receptions, 59 yards
Buffalo	Passing	CJ Ogbonna	4/14, 41 yards, TD, 2 INT
Buffalo	Rushing	Ron Cook	12 carries, 47 yards
Buffalo	Receiving	Darrell Harding Jr.	2 receptions, 39 yards, TD

=== at Kent State ===
Buffalo (2–5) vs. Kent State (1–6) – Game summary

Quarter	1	2	3	4	Total
Bulls	7	7	3	7	24
Golden Flashes	6	0	0	0	6

at Dix Stadium • Kent, Ohio

- Date: October 21, 2023
- Game time: 3:30 p.m.
- Game weather: 51 °F (11 °C); Cloudy; Wind at W13 MPH
- Game attendance: 11,735
- Referee: Matt Packowski
- TV: ESPN+
- Boxscore

Game information

First quarter

- KENT – (6:16) Andrew Glass 38-yard field goal (Drive: 9 plays, 60 yards, 4:48; Kent State 3–0)
- KENT – (4:31) Andrew Glass 37-yard field goal (Drive: 4 plays, 3 yards, 1:26; Kent State 6–0)
- UB – (6:21) Andrew Schnackenberg 2-yard pass from Cole Snyder, Alex McNulty kick (Drive: 5 plays, 75 yards, 2:27; Buffalo 7–6)

Second quarter

- UB – (9:56) Ron Cook 1-yard run, Alex McNulty kick (Drive: 11 plays, 68 yards, 5:34; Buffalo 14–6)

Third quarter

- UB – (11:55) Alex McNulty 53-yard field goal (Drive: 7 plays, 33 yards, 2:57; Buffalo 17–6)

Fourth quarter

- UB – (5:54) Al-Jay Henderson 2-yard run, Alex McNulty kick (Drive: 7 plays, 51 yards, 4:29; Buffalo 24–6)

Statistics	UB	KENT
First downs	15	10
Plays–yards	67–331	61–164
Rushes–yards	34–136	35–86
Passing yards	195	78
Passing: comp–att–int	18–33–1	12–26–1
Turnovers		
Time of possession	31:58	27:53

Team	Category	Player	Statistics
Buffalo	Passing	Cole Snyder	18/33, 195 yards, TD, INT
Buffalo	Rushing	Jacqez Barksdale	10 carries, 85 yards
Buffalo	Receiving	Marlyn Johnson	5 receptions, 64 yards
Kent State	Passing	Michael Alaimo	7/14, 51 yards
Kent State	Rushing	Jaylen Thomas	17 carries, 65 yards
Kent State	Receiving	Chrishon McCray	5 receptions, 52 yards

=== at Toledo ===
Buffalo (3–5) vs. Toledo (7–1) – Game summary

Quarter	1	2	3	4	Total
Bulls	7	0	6	0	13
Rockets	14	10	7	0	31

at Glass Bowl • Toledo, Ohio

- Date: October 31, 2023
- Game time: 7:30 p.m.
- Game weather: 33 °F (1 °C); Snow; Wind at E7 MPH
- Game attendance: 14,939
- Referee: Andrew Speciale
- TV announcers (ESPN2): Clay Matvick (play-by-play) and Aaron Murray (analyst)
- Boxscore

Game information

First quarter
Second quarter
Third quarter
Fourth quarter

Statistics	UB	UT
First downs	18	13
Plays–yards	85–324	53–355
Rushes–yards	44–173	34–179
Passing yards	151	176
Passing: comp–att–int	14–41–2	12–19–1
Turnovers		
Time of possession	34:44	25:16

Team	Category	Player	Statistics
Buffalo	Passing	Cole Snyder	14/41, 151 yards, TD, 2 INT
Buffalo	Rushing	Ron Cook	17 carries, 97 yards
Buffalo	Receiving	Darrell Harding, Jr.	2 receptions, 44 yards
Toledo	Passing	Dequan Finn	12/19, 176 yards, TD, INT
Toledo	Rushing	Peny Boone	12 carries, 125 yards, TD
Toledo	Receiving	Anthony Torres	4 receptions, 84 yards, TD

=== Ohio ===
Ohio (6–3) vs. Buffalo (3–6) – Game summary

Quarter	1	2	3	4	Total
Bobcats	0	0	10	10	20
Bulls	0	3	7	0	10

at University at Buffalo Stadium • Amherst, New York

- Date: November 7, 2023
- Game time: 7:30 p.m.
- Game weather: 45 °F (7 °C); Clear; Wind at 15 MPH
- Game attendance: 11,444
- Referee: Jeremy Valentine
- TV announcers (ESPN2): Jay Alter (play-by-play) and Tom Luginbill (analyst)
- Boxscore

Game information

First quarter
Second quarter

- UB – (6:24) Alex McNulty 41-yard field goal (Drive: 10 plays, 71 yards, 5:51; Buffalo 3–0)

Third quarter

- OHIO – (8:48) Gianni Spetic 29-yard field goal (Drive: 13 plays, 63 yards, 6:07; Tied 3–3)
- OHIO – (2:46) Sieh Bangura 2-yard run, Gianni Spetic kick (Drive: 7 plays, 38 yards, 3:52; Ohio 10–3)

Fourth quarter

- UB – (13:30) CJ Ogbonna 2-yard run, Alex McNulty kick (Drive: 8 plays, 75 yards, 1:30; Tied 10–10)
- OHIO – (8:52) Gianni Spetic 25-yard field goal (Drive: 9 plays, 66 yards, 4:38; Ohio 13–10)
- OHIO – (1:55) Sieh Bangura 1-yard run, Gianni Spetic kick (Drive: 8 plays, 29 yards, 5:05; Ohio 20–10)

Statistics	OHIO	UB
First downs	15	14
Plays–yards	51–236	64–295
Rushes–yards	30–115	41–114
Passing yards	121	181
Passing: comp–att–int	14–21–0	16–23–0
Turnovers		
Time of possession	27:50	29:24

Team	Category	Player	Statistics
Ohio	Passing	Kurtis Rourke	14/21, 121 yards
Ohio	Rushing	Sieh Bangura	17 carries, 78 yards, 2 TD
Ohio	Receiving	Tyler Walton	6 receptions, 62 yards
Buffalo	Passing	Cole Snyder	14/21, 171 yards
Buffalo	Rushing	Ron Cook	16 carries, 48 yards
Buffalo	Receiving	Boobie Curry	4 receptions, 66 yards

=== at Miami ===
Buffalo (3–7) vs. Miami (8–2) – Game summary

Quarter	1	2	3	4	Total
Bulls	0	3	7	0	10
RedHawks	0	10	3	10	23

at Fred C. Yager Stadium • Oxford, Ohio

- Date: November 15, 2023
- Game time: 7:05 p.m.
- Game weather: 54 °F (12 °C); Clear; Wind at SW3 MPH
- Game attendance: 7,561
- Referee: Greg Sujack
- TV announcers (ESPN2): Mike Corey (play-by-play) and Rocky Boiman (analyst)
- Boxscore

Game information

First quarter
Second quarter

- MIAMI – (8:45) Graham Nicholson 25-yard field goal (Drive: 5 plays, 36 yards, 1:34; Miami 3–0)
- MIAMI – (2:50) Rashad Amos 30-yard run, Graham Nicholson kick (Drive: 6 plays, 88 yards, 3:36; Miami 10–0)
- UB – (0:00) Alex McNulty 48-yard field goal (Drive: 11 plays, 47 yards, 2:46; Miami 10–3)

Third quarter

- MIAMI – (9:47) Graham Nicholson 37-yard field goal (Drive: 9 plays, 60 yards, 5:05; Miami 13–3)
- UB – (2:14) CJ Ogbonna 2-yard run, Alex McNulty kick (Drive: 13 plays, 75 yards, 7:33; Miami 13–10)

Fourth quarter

- MIAMI – (10:45) Rashad Amos 2-yard run, Graham Nicholson kick (Drive: 3 plays, 62 yards, 1:31; Miami 20–10)
- MIAMI – (3:11) Graham Nicholson 23-yard field goal (Drive: 11 plays, 40 yards, 5:44; Miami 23–10)

Statistics	UB	MIAMI
First downs	12	13
Plays–yards	61–278	52–326
Rushes–yards	44–131	36–180
Passing yards	147	146
Passing: comp–att–int	7–17–0	9–16–0
Turnovers		
Time of possession	30:08	29:52

Team	Category	Player	Statistics
Buffalo	Passing	Cole Snyder	6/14, 120 yards
Buffalo	Rushing	CJ Ogbonna	16 carries, 50 yards, TD
Buffalo	Receiving	Marlyn Johnson	1 reception, 80 yards
Miami	Passing	Aveon Smith	9/16, 146 yards
Miami	Rushing	Rashad Amos	15 carries, 82 yards, 2 TD
Miami	Receiving	Javon Tracy	5 receptions, 123 yards

=== Eastern Michigan ===
Eastern Michigan (5–6) vs. Buffalo (3–8) – Game summary

Quarter	1	2	3	4	Total
Eagles	7	17	0	0	24
Bulls	0	0	8	3	11

at University at Buffalo Stadium • Amherst, New York

- Date: November 21, 2023
- Game time: 7:30 p.m.
- Game weather: 40 °F (4 °C); Rain
- Game attendance: 11,243
- Referee: Billy Williams
- TV announcers (ESPN2): Matt Schick (play-by-play) and Dustin Fox (analyst)
- Boxscore

Game information

First quarter

- EMU – (7:20) Austin Smith 5-yard run, Jesus Gomez kick (Drive: 8 plays, 62 yards, 4:09; Eastern Michigan 7–0)

Second quarter

- EMU – (8:41) Jaylon Jackson 19-yard pass from Austin Smith, Jesus Gomez kick (Drive: 11 plays, 80 yards, 4:49; Eastern Michigan 14–0)
- EMU – (4:21) Jesus Gomez 29-yard field goal (Drive: 8 plays, 22 yards, 4:13; Eastern Michigan 17–0)
- EMU – (0:07) Samson Evans 1-yard run, Jesus Gomez kick (Drive: 8 plays, 95 yards, 2:02; Eastern Michigan 24–0)

Third quarter

- UB – (4:45) Ron Cook 6-yard run, Cameron Ball pass (Drive: 10 plays, 56 yards, 4:30; Eastern Michigan 24–8)

Fourth quarter

- UB – (6:01) Alex McNulty 40-yard field goal (Drive: 7 plays, 50 yards, 2:20; Eastern Michigan 24–11)

Statistics	EMU	UB
First downs	21	18
Plays–yards	73–367	58–337
Rushes–yards	46–226	30–163
Passing yards	141	174
Passing: comp–att–int	19–27–0	12–28–0
Turnovers		
Time of possession	34:52	24:37

Team	Category	Player	Statistics
Eastern Michigan	Passing	Austin Smith	19/27, 141 yards, TD
Eastern Michigan	Rushing	Samson Evans	22 carries, 127 yards, TD
Eastern Michigan	Receiving	JB Mitchell	7 receptions, 75 yards
Buffalo	Passing	Cole Snyder	11/26, 135 yards
Buffalo	Rushing	Ron Cook; CJ Ogbonna	10 carries, 43 yards, TD; 6 carries, 43 yards
Buffalo	Receiving	Marlyn Johnson	4 receptions, 80 yards
