= 2023 MAC Football Championship Game =

- Conference championship
Miami RedHawks	Toledo Rockets
(10–2)	(11–1)
23	14
Head coach: Chuck Martin	Head coach: Jason Candle
	AP / Coaches / CFP; 23 / NR / NR
	1	2	3	4	Total
Miami	10	0	3	10	23
Toledo	0	8	6	0	14
- Date: December 2, 2023
- Season: 2023
- Stadium: Ford Field
- Location: Detroit, Michigan
- MVP: Offense: Aveon Smith (QB, Miami); Defense: Matt Salopek (LB, Miami); Special Teams: Graham Nicholson (K, Miami)
- Favorite: Toledo by 8
- Referee: David Siegle
- Attendance: 20,200

United States TV coverage
- Network: ESPN
- Announcers: Anish Shroff (play-by-play), Andre Ware (analyst), and Paul Carcaterra (sideline)

2023 Mid-American Conference football standings
	Conf.			Overall
Team	W		L	W		L
East Division
Miami (OH) xy$	7	–	1	11	–	3
Ohio	6	–	2	10	–	3
Bowling Green	5	–	3	7	–	6
Buffalo	3	–	5	3	–	9
Akron	1	–	7	2	–	10
Kent State	0	–	8	1	–	11
West Division
Toledo xy	8	–	0	11	–	3
Northern Illinois	5	–	3	7	–	6
Eastern Michigan	4	–	4	6	–	7
Central Michigan	3	–	5	5	–	7
Ball State	3	–	5	4	–	8
Western Michigan	3	–	5	4	–	8
Championship: Miami (OH) 23, Toledo 14
$ – Conference champion; x – Division champion/co-champions; y – Championship game participant

The 2023 MAC Football Championship Game was a college football conference championship game played on December 2, 2023, at Ford Field in Detroit, Michigan. It was the 27th edition of the MAC Football Championship Game and determined the champion of the Mid-American Conference (MAC) for the 2023 season. The game began at 12:00 p.m. EST and aired on ESPN. The game featured the Western Division champion Toledo Rockets against the Eastern Division champion Miami RedHawks. Miami won their first MAC Championship since 2019 with a 23–14 upset victory.

== Venue ==
The 2023 MAC title game was held at Ford Field for the 20th consecutive season. The venue, located in downtown Detroit at 2000 Brush St., is the home of the Detroit Lions of the National Football League (NFL) and has a seating capacity for football of 65,000.

== Teams ==
The game featured the Toledo Rockets, champions of the Western Division, against the Miami RedHawks, champions of the Eastern Division.

=== Toledo ===
Toledo clinched a berth in the championship game following their win over Eastern Michigan on November 8.

=== Miami (OH) ===
Miami clinched a berth in the championship game following their win over Buffalo on November 16.

== Game summary ==
2023 MAC Championship Game
Miami RedHawks (10–2, 7–1) vs. Toledo Rockets (11–1, 8–0)

Quarter	1	2	3	4	Total
Miami	10	0	3	10	23
Toledo	0	8	6	0	14

at Ford Field • Detroit, MI

- Date: Saturday, December 2, 2023
- Game time: 12:00 p.m. EST
- Game weather: N/A (game played indoors)
- Game attendance: 20,200
- Referee: David Siegle
- TV announcers (ESPN): Anish Shroff, Andre Ware and Paul Carcaterra
- MAC Notes

Game information

First Quarter

- (11:40) M-OH – Graham Nicholson 33 yard field goal (Drive: 6 plays, 48 yards, 3:20; Miami 3–0)
- (0:46) M-OH – Rashad Amos 1 yard rush, Graham Nicholson kick (Drive: 6 plays, 39 yards, 3:26; Miami 10–0)

Second Quarter

- (0:09) TOL – Anthony Torres 13 yard pass from Dequan Finn, Dequan Finn pass to Anthony Torres for 2-PT conversion (Drive: 9 plays, 74 yards, 3:17; Miami 10–8)

Third Quarter

- (10:55) M-OH – Graham Nicholson 40 yard field goal (Drive: 5 plays, 33 yards, 3:01; Miami 13–8)
- (9:00) TOL – Dequan Finn 4 yard rush, Luke Pawlak kick failed (Drive: 4 plays, 75 yards, 1:55; Toledo 14–13)

Fourth Quarter

- (13:27) M-OH – Graham Nicholson 40 yard field goal (Drive: 9 plays, 26 yards, 4:06; Miami 16–14)
- (2:41) M-OH – Rashad Amos 10 yard rush, Graham Nicholson kick (Drive: 6 plays, 72 yards, 3:23; Miami 23–14)

Statistics	Miami	Toledo
First downs	14	17
Plays–Yards	59–306	65–370
Rushes/yards	43–197	29–97
Passing yards	109	273
Passing: Comp–Att–Int	6–16–0	18–36–1
Time of possession	34:03	25:57

Team	Category	Player	Statistics
Miami	Passing	Aveon Smith	6/16, 109 yards
Miami	Rushing	Aveon Smith	21 carries, 99 yards
Miami	Receiving	Luke Bolden	1 reception, 40 yards
Toledo	Passing	Dequan Finn	18/36, 273 yards, TD, INT
Toledo	Rushing	Peny Boone	11 carries, 41 yards
Toledo	Receiving	Junior Vandeross III	6 receptions, 106 yards
