= DJ Mangas =

American football coach (born 1989)

Buffalo Bills
- Title: Assistant wide receivers coach

Personal information
- Born: February 22, 1989 (age 37); Arlington, Virginia, U.S.
- Listed height: 6 ft 1 in (1.85 m)
- Listed weight: 194 lb (88 kg)

Career information
- Position: Wide receiver
- High school: Chantilly (VA) Paul VI Catholic
- College: William & Mary

Career history
- Hampden–Sydney (2012) Quarterbacks coach; Georgetown (2013) Running backs coach; William & Mary (2014–2018); Running backs coach (2014–2016); Offensive coordinator & quarterbacks coach (2017–2018); LSU (2019) Offensive analyst; Carolina Panthers (2020) Coaching assistant; LSU (2021) Passing game coordinator; UCF (2022) Defensive analyst; Buffalo (2023) Offensive coordinator & tight ends coach; Buffalo Bills (2023–present); Offensive quality control coach (2023–2025); Assistant wide receivers coach (2026–present)

Awards and highlights
- CFP national champion (2019)

Daniel J. Mangas (born February 22, 1989) is an American football coach who is currently the assistant wide receivers coach for the Buffalo Bills of the National Football League (NFL).

== Playing career ==
Mangas played college football at William & Mary from 2007 to 2011, where he was a former walk-on who played wide receiver and also served as the team's emergency quarterback.

== Coaching career ==
=== Early coaching career ===
Mangas began his career as the quarterbacks coach at Hampden–Sydney College in 2012, and was later the running backs coach at Georgetown. He would return to his alma mater William & Mary in 2014 as their running backs coach on the recommendation of former college teammate and then-William & Mary linebackers coach Joe Brady. He was promoted to offensive coordinator in 2017, and was one of the youngest coordinators in Division I football at 28.

=== LSU ===
Mangas joined the coaching staff at LSU in 2019, serving as the right-hand man to Brady, who was the Tigers' passing game coordinator.

=== Carolina Panthers ===
Mangas followed Brady, who was hired as the offensive coordinator of the Carolina Panthers, and joined him as a coaching assistant.

=== LSU (second stint) ===
Mangas was rehired as the passing game coordinator at LSU in 2021, joining Panthers quarterbacks coach Jake Peetz, who was named the Tigers offensive coordinator.

=== UCF ===
In 2022, Mangas was hired as a defensive analyst at UCF.

=== Buffalo ===
On January 14, 2023, Mangas was hired as the offensive coordinator at Buffalo.

=== Buffalo Bills ===
Immediately following the conclusion of the 2023 Buffalo Bulls football team's season, Mangas left the Bulls and was hired as an offensive aide by the Buffalo Bills. Mangas joined the Bills in-season during the team's bye week, once again reuniting with Joe Brady, who had been named the team's interim offensive coordinator on November 14, 2023. Following the 2025 season, Mangas was retained on the Bills' coaching staff, after Brady was promoted to head coach. Mangas was promoted to become the team's assistant wide receivers coach for the 2026 season.
