= 2023 Toledo Rockets football team =

American college football season

2023 Toledo Rockets football

MAC West Division champion

MAC Championship, L 14–23 vs. Miami (OH)

Arizona Bowl, L 15–16 vs. Wyoming
- Conference: Mid-American Conference
- West Division
- Record: 11–3 (8–0 MAC)
- Head coach: Jason Candle (8th season)
- Co-offensive coordinators: Mike Hallett (4th season); Robert Weiner (4th season)
- Offensive scheme: Spread
- Defensive coordinator: Vince Kehres (4th season)
- Co-defensive coordinators: Ross Watson (4th season); Craig Kuligowski (4th season)
- Base defense: 4–2–5
- Home stadium: Glass Bowl

2023 Mid-American Conference football standings
	Conf.			Overall
Team	W		L	W		L
East Division
Miami (OH) xy$	7	–	1	11	–	3
Ohio	6	–	2	10	–	3
Bowling Green	5	–	3	7	–	6
Buffalo	3	–	5	3	–	9
Akron	1	–	7	2	–	10
Kent State	0	–	8	1	–	11
West Division
Toledo xy	8	–	0	11	–	3
Northern Illinois	5	–	3	7	–	6
Eastern Michigan	4	–	4	6	–	7
Central Michigan	3	–	5	5	–	7
Ball State	3	–	5	4	–	8
Western Michigan	3	–	5	4	–	8
Championship: Miami (OH) 23, Toledo 14
$ – Conference champion; x – Division champion/co-champions; y – Championship game participant

The 2023 Toledo Rockets football team represented the University of Toledo during the 2023 NCAA Division I FBS football season. The Rockets were led by eighth-year head coach Jason Candle and played their home games at the Glass Bowl in Toledo, Ohio. They competed as members of the West Division of the Mid-American Conference (MAC). The Rockets won the West with a perfect conference record. Their quarterback Dequan Finn won Player of the Year and coach Jason Candle won coach of the year. Miami defeated them in the MAC Championship Game with a 23–14 upset victory. They played Wyoming in the Arizona Bowl, where they lost 15–16. The Rockets drew an average home attendance of 19,675 in 2023.

== Preseason ==
=== Preseason coaches poll ===
On July 20, the MAC announced the preseason coaches poll. Toledo was picked to finish first in the West Division and received seven votes to win conference.

== Schedule ==
Date	Time	Opponent	Rank	Site	TV	Result	Attendance
September 2	7:30 p.m.	at Illinois*		Memorial Stadium; Champaign, IL	BTN	L 28–30	48,898
September 9	3:30 p.m.	Texas Southern*		Glass Bowl; Toledo, OH	ESPN+	W 71–3	22,743
September 16	7:00 p.m.	San Jose State*		Glass Bowl; Toledo, OH	ESPN+	W 21–17	20,039
September 23	1:30 p.m.	Western Michigan		Glass Bowl; Toledo, OH	ESPN+	W 49–31	19,068
September 30	3:30 p.m.	Northern Illinois^{†}		Glass Bowl; Toledo, OH	ESPNU	W 35–33	23,417
October 7	12:00 p.m.	at UMass*		Warren McGuirk Alumni Stadium; Hadley, MA	ESPNU	W 41–24	9,623
October 14	2:00 p.m.	at Ball State		Scheumann Stadium; Muncie, IN	ESPN+	W 13–6	7,680
October 21	4:00 p.m.	at Miami (OH)		Yager Stadium; Oxford, OH	ESPNU	W 21–17	17,321
October 31	7:30 p.m.	Buffalo		Glass Bowl; Toledo, OH	ESPN2	W 31–13	14,939
November 8	7:30 p.m.	Eastern Michigan		Glass Bowl; Toledo, OH	ESPN2	W 49–23	17,842
November 14	7:00 p.m.	at Bowling Green		Doyt L. Perry Stadium; Bowling Green, OH (Battle of I-75)	ESPN2	W 32–31	20,590
November 24	12:00 p.m.	at Central Michigan	No. 23	Kelly/Shorts Stadium; Mount Pleasant, MI	ESPNU	W 32–17	8,612
December 2	12:00 p.m.	vs. Miami (OH)	No. 23	Ford Field; Detroit, MI (MAC Championship Game)	ESPN	L 14–23	20,200
December 30	4:30 p.m.	vs. Wyoming		Arizona Stadium; Tucson, AZ (Arizona Bowl)	The CW/Barstool Sports	L 15–16	30,428
*Non-conference game; ^{†}Homecoming; Rankings from AP Poll released prior to the game; All times are in Eastern time

== Rankings ==
Ranking movements Legend: ██ Increase in ranking ██ Decrease in ranking — = Not ranked RV = Received votes
	Week															
Poll	Pre	1	2	3	4	5	6	7	8	9	10	11	12	13	14	Final
AP	RV	—	—	—	—	—	—	—	RV	RV	RV	RV	23	23	RV	RV
Coaches	RV	—	—	—	—	—	—	—	RV	RV	RV	RV	RV	RV	RV	—
CFP	Not released									—	—	—	—	—	—	Not released

Source: AP -

Coaches -

CFP -

== NFL draft ==
The NFL draft was held at Campus Martius Park in Detroit, Michigan, on April 25–27, 2024. Additionally Chris McDonald, Dallas Gant, Judge Culpepper, and David Nwaogwugwu were signed as undrafted free agents.

Rockets who were picked in the 2024 NFL Draft:

Round	Pick	Player	Position	NFL team
1	22	Quinyon Mitchell	CB	Philadelphia Eagles
