= Terion Stewart =

American football player (born 2001)

Profile
- Position: Running back

Personal information
- Born: November 29, 2001 (age 24); Memphis, Tennessee, U.S.
- Listed height: 5 ft 6 in (1.68 m)
- Listed weight: 219 lb (99 kg)

Career information
- High school: Sandusky (Sandusky, Ohio)
- College: Bowling Green (2020–2024); Virginia Tech (2025)
- NFL draft: 2026: undrafted

Career history
- Kansas City Chiefs (2026)*; Calgary Stampeders (2026)*
- * Offseason or practice squad member only

Awards and highlights
- First-team All-MAC (2024); Second-team All-MAC (2023)
- Stats at Pro Football Reference

Terion Stewart (born November 29, 2001) is an American professional football running back. He previously played for the Calgary Stampeders of the Canadian Football League (CFL). He played college football for the Virginia Tech Hokies and the Bowling Green Falcons.

== Early life ==
Stewart was born on November 29, 2001, in Memphis, Tennessee. He attended and played football at Sandusky High School in Ohio. As a senior, he ran for 2,150 yards and 29 touchdowns. He was named a two-time league MVP and Northwest District Offensive Player of the Year.

== College career ==
=== Bowling Green ===
On June 22, 2019, Stewart committed to Bowling Green. He made his Bowling Green debut against Toledo, but did not receive any touches. The following week against Kent State, Stewart had 14 carries for 162 yards and two touchdowns. He had a Falcon's season long 69-yard touchdown run in the fourth quarter. In his third game, Stewart carried the ball nine times for 42 yards and two touchdowns against Buffalo. He ended his freshman campaign appearing in four of the five games for the Falcons. He led the team with 295 rushing yards on 37 carries with four touchdowns and an impressive 8.0 yards per carry in a condensed COVID-19 season.

In 2021, Stewart earned his first collegiate start in week 1 against Tennessee. On November 30, 2021, Stewart had a career high 170 yards on 11 carries scoring two touchdowns. For the second consecutive season, Stewart led the Falcons with 412 rushing yards and five touchdowns.

Stewart missed the entire 2022 season due to academic and mental health issues. In 2023, Stewart rejoined the Falcons and played in nine of the 13 games. He had four 100-yard games, including a season high 138 yards against Georgia Tech in an upset victory. He was sidelined the final four games of the season after sustaining an injury against Ball State. He was named Second-team All-MAC.

In 2024, Stewart was named to the preseason watchlists for the Doak Walker Award, Maxwell Award and Walter Camp Award. In week 1 against Fordham, Stewart ran for 161 yards and three touchdowns, matching his career high. He finished the season with a career-high 898 rushing yards, bringing his career total to 2,367. He finished his Bowling Green career eighth in rushing yards and tied for seventh in rushing touchdowns.

=== Virginia Tech ===
On December 4, 2024, Stewart announced that he would be entering the transfer portal. He announced his commitment to Virginia Tech on December 20, 2024.

Stewart missed the season opener due to an offseason injury. He made his Hokies debut the following week against Vanderbilt. Stewart recorded three carries for 10 yards and one reception for six yards. The following week against Old Dominion, Stewart had 55 yards on eight carries and sustained an injury that kept him out the next game against Wofford. In week 5, Stewart had a career high 174 yards on 15 carries in a victory against NC State. Stewart's performance earned him his first Hokies start the following week against Wake Forest. Stewart had a game high 62 yards on nine carries before leaving the game in the second half with an injury.

=== Statistics ===
Year	Team	Games		Rushing				Receiving			
Year	Team	GP	GS	Att	Yds	Avg	TD	Rec	Yds	Avg	TD
2020	Bowling Green	4	0	37	295	8.0	4	2	10	5.0	0
2021	Bowling Green	9	5	70	412	5.9	5	1	0	0.0	0
2022	Bowling Green	DNP (Not with team)									
2023	Bowling Green	9	6	125	762	6.1	8	1	27	27.0	0
2024	Bowling Green	11	5	166	898	5.4	6	1	12	12.0	0
2025	Virginia Tech	10	2	82	469	5.7	0	4	19	4.8	0
Career		43	18	480	2,836	5.9	23	9	68	7.6	0

== Professional career ==
Pre-draft measurables
Height	Weight	Arm length	Hand span	Wingspan	40-yard dash	10-yard split	20-yard split	20-yard shuttle	Vertical jump	Broad jump	Bench press
5 ft 5 7/8 in (1.67 m)	219 lb (99 kg)	30 1/8 in (0.77 m)	9 7/8 in (0.25 m)	5 ft 5 5/8 in (1.67 m)	4.56 s	1.50 s	2.57 s	4.39 s	32.5 in (0.83 m)	9 ft 7 in (2.92 m)	18 reps
All values from Pro Day

On April 27, 2026, Stewart signed with the Kansas City Chiefs of the National Football League (NFL).

On May 22, 2026, Stewart signed with the Calgary Stampeders of the Canadian Football League (CFL).
