= Graham Nicholson =

American football player (born 2002)

No. 14
- Position: Placekicker

Personal information
- Born: December 7, 2002 (age 23)
- Listed height: 5 ft 11 in (1.80 m)
- Listed weight: 181 lb (82 kg)

Career information
- High school: Summit Country Day (Cincinnati, Ohio)
- College: Miami (OH) (2021–2023); Alabama (2024)

Awards and highlights
- Lou Groza Award (2023); Consensus All-American (2023); MAC Special Teams Player of the Year (2023); First team All-MAC (2023)
- Stats at ESPN

Graham Nicholson (born December 7, 2002) is an American college football kicker who played for the Miami RedHawks and Alabama Crimson Tide. Nicholson won the Lou Groza Award in 2023, which is awarded to the nation's best kicker.

== Early life ==
Nicholson played football and soccer for the Summit Country Day School in Cincinnati, Ohio, winning two state championships in the latter in 2017 and 2018.

== College career ==
=== Miami Ohio ===
In 2023, Nicholson made 27 of 28 field goals, including a season-long of 52 yards, and won the Lou Groza Award as he helped the RedHawks win the MAC Championship. After the season, he entered his name into the NCAA transfer portal.

=== Alabama ===
In April 2024, Nicholson transferred to play for the Alabama Crimson Tide.

=== Statistics ===
Year	Team	Games	Kicking												
Year	Team	GP	FGM	FGA	Pct	0–19	20–29	30–39	40–49	50+	Lng	XPM	XPA	Pct	Pts
2021	Miami	13	15	20	75.0	0–0	6–7	3–4	6–7	0–2	49	36	40	90.0	81
2022	Miami	13	18	23	78.3	0–0	5–5	6–8	7–10	0–0	49	26	27	96.3	80
2023	Miami	14	27	28	96.4	1–1	6–6	10–10	9–10	1–1	52	35	37	94.6	116
2024	Alabama	13	8	10	80.0	0–0	3–3	2–2	2–3	1–2	51	53	53	100.0	77
Career		53	68	81	84.0	1–1	20–21	22–25	23–29	2–5	52	152	159	95.5	356

== Professional career ==
Pre-draft measurables
Height	Weight	Arm length	Hand span
5 ft 11 1/8 in (1.81 m)	181 lb (82 kg)	30 in (0.76 m)	8 1/8 in (0.21 m)
All values from Pro Day
