= Peny Boone =

American football player (born 2002)

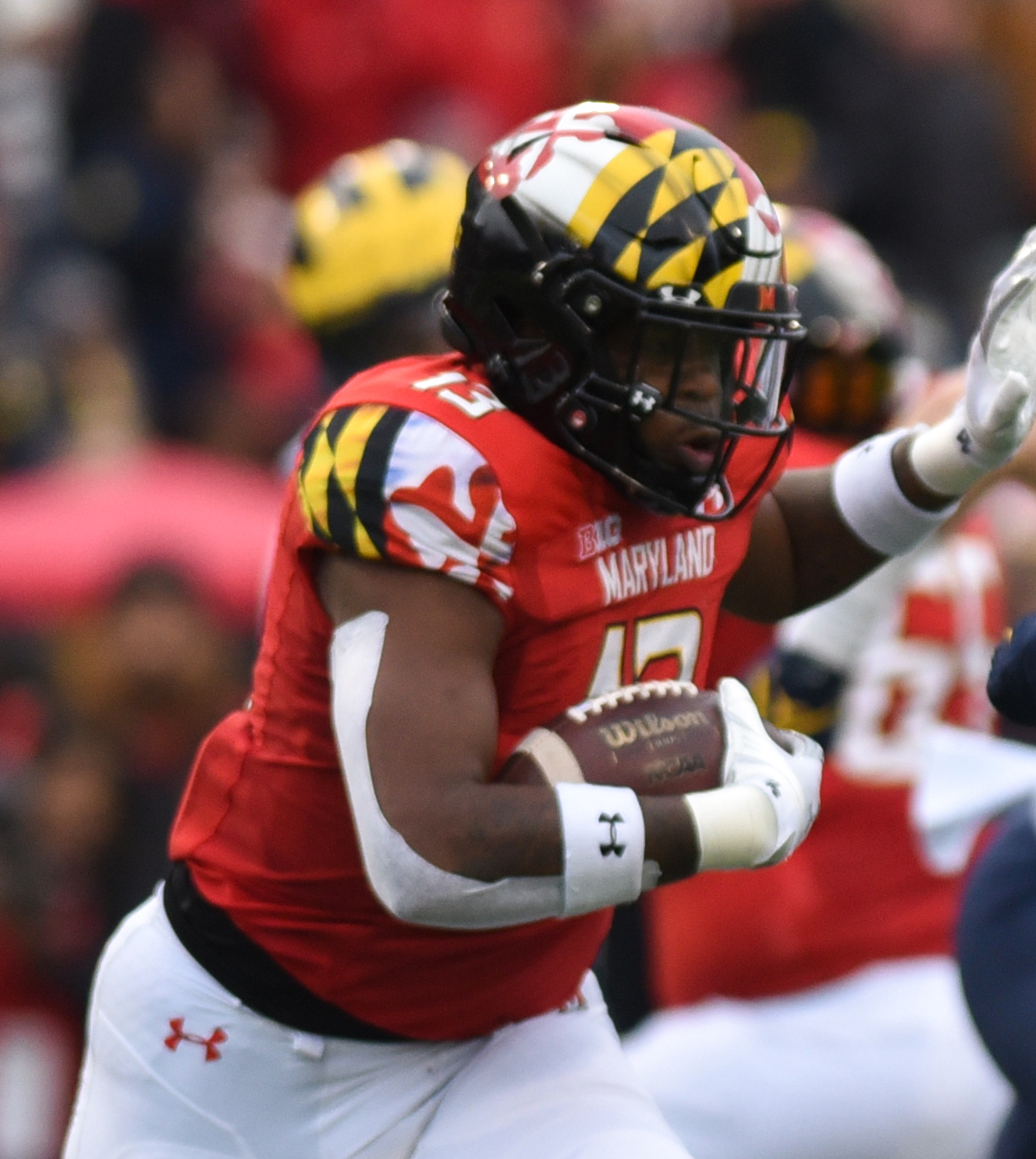
- Boone with Maryland in 2021

Profile
- Position: Running back

Personal information
- Born: May 8, 2002 (age 24); Detroit, Michigan, U.S.
- Listed height: 6 ft 1 in (1.85 m)
- Listed weight: 232 lb (105 kg)

Career information
- High school: Martin Luther King (Detroit)
- College: Maryland (2020–2021); Toledo (2022–2023); UCF (2024)
- NFL draft: 2025: undrafted

Career history
- Toronto Argonauts (2025)*; Saskatchewan Roughriders (2026)*
- * Offseason or practice squad member only

Awards and highlights
- MAC Offensive Player of the Year (2023); First team All-MAC (2023)
- Stats at CFL.ca

Peny Boone (born May 8, 2002) is an American professional football running back. He played college football for the Maryland Terrapins, Toledo Rockets and UCF Knights.

== Early life ==
Boone attended Martin Luther King High School in Detroit, Michigan. As a junior, Boone rushed for 773 yards and eight touchdowns. He finished his junior year rushing for 111 yards in the state title game, leading Martin Luther King to a state title. A four-star recruit, he committed to play college football at the University of Maryland, College Park over offers from Purdue, Indiana, and Tennessee.

== College career ==
After playing sparingly at Maryland for two seasons, only rushing the ball a total of 58 times, Boone entered the transfer portal.

After transferring to the University of Toledo, Boone rushed for 418 yards and three touchdowns in 2022. The following season, he rushed for 1,400 yards and 15 touchdowns, being named the MAC Offensive Player of the Year. Against Western Michigan, Boone rushed for a career-high 211 yards and two touchdowns in a 49–31 victory. On December 26, 2023, Boone announced his decision to enter the transfer portal for a second time.

On January 5, 2024, Boone announced that he would be transferring to the University of Louisville to play for the Louisville Cardinals. However, in April 2024, Boone re-entered the transfer portal without ever appearing with Louisville.

On May 1, 2024, Boone announced his commitment to the University of Central Florida to play for the UCF Knights.

=== Statistics ===
Year	Team	Games	Rushing				Receiving			
Year	Team	GP	Att	Yards	Avg	TD	Rec	Yards	Avg	TD
2020	Maryland	4	19	86	4.5	0	2	21	10.5	0
2021	Maryland	10	39	172	4.4	2	3	2	0.7	0
2022	Toledo	13	115	439	3.8	3	11	93	8.5	0
2023	Toledo	13	194	1,400	7.2	15	15	219	14.6	1
2024	UCF	6	34	208	6.1	2	1	9	9.0	0
Career		46	401	2,305	5.7	22	32	344	10.8	1

== Professional career ==
Pre-draft measurables
Height	Weight	Arm length	Hand span	40-yard dash	10-yard split	20-yard split	20-yard shuttle	Three-cone drill	Vertical jump	Broad jump
5 ft 11 5/8 in (1.82 m)	226 lb (103 kg)	31 in (0.79 m)	8 5/8 in (0.22 m)	4.69 s	1.62 s	2.70 s	4.36 s	6.93 s	30.0 in (0.76 m)	9 ft 2 in (2.79 m)
All values from Pro Day

After going undrafted in the 2025 NFL draft, Boone attended minicamp on a tryout basis for the Carolina Panthers, but did not sign a contract.

=== Toronto Argonauts ===
On August 5, 2025, it was announced that Boone had been signed to the practice roster of the Toronto Argonauts.

=== Saskatchewan Roughriders ===
On February 10, 2026, Boone signed with the Saskatchewan Roughriders of the Canadian Football League (CFL). He was released on May 10.

== Personal life ==
Boone is the younger brother of late NFL running back Zurlon Tipton.
