= Jahaad Proctor =

American basketball player

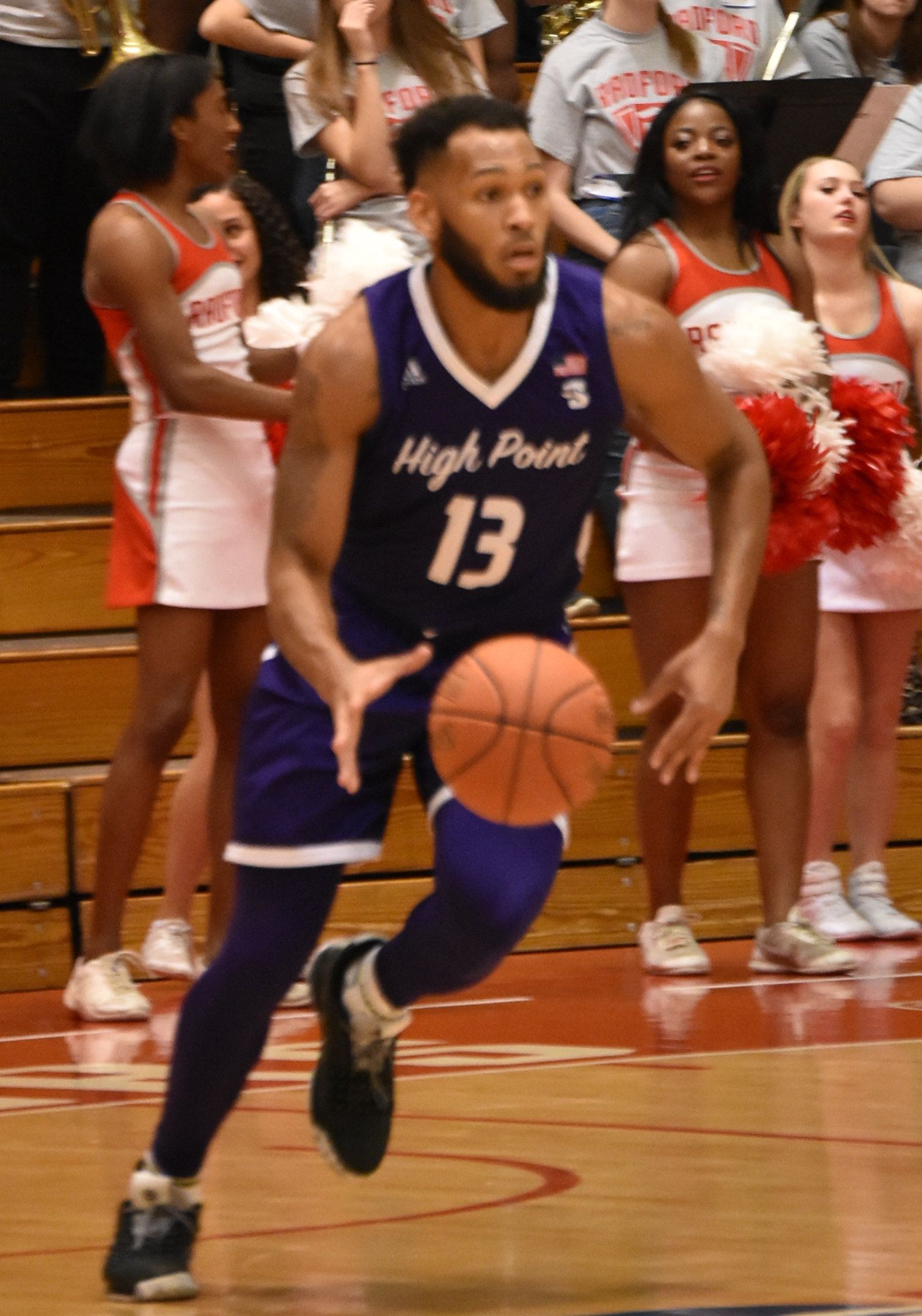

York Mighty Ants
- Position: Shooting guard
- League: Triple Threat Basketball League

Personal information
- Born: August 14, 1997 (age 29)
- Listed height: 6 ft 3 in (1.91 m)
- Listed weight: 205 lb (93 kg)

Career information
- High school: Susquehanna Township (Harrisburg, Pennsylvania); Harrisburg (Harrisburg, Pennsylvania)
- College: Iona (2015–2016); High Point (2017–2019); Purdue (2019–2020)
- NBA draft: 2020: undrafted
- Playing career: 2020–present

Career history
- 2020: Vilpas Vikings
- 2021–2022: Kirchheim Knights
- 2022–2023: Kingdom Abound
- 2023–present: York Mighty Ants

Career highlights
- 2x Second-team All-Big South (2018, 2019)

Jahaad Proctor (born August 14, 1997) is an American professional basketball player for the York Mighty Ants of the Triple Threat Basketball League. He attended Harrisburg High School in Pennsylvania and became the program's all-time leading scorer. Proctor began his college basketball career playing for the Iona Gaels but transferred after his freshman season to play for the High Point Panthers. Proctor developed into an All-Big South performer at High Point and averaged 19.5 points per game as a junior. Proctor transferred to play for the Purdue Boilermakers as a graduate transfer, averaging 9.0 points per game. He signed with the Vilpas Vikings in July 2020.

== Early life and high school career ==
Proctor grew up in Harrisburg, Pennsylvania, playing baseball, football, and basketball, but he decided to focus on basketball in seventh grade. At the time, he was not as fast or as athletic as some of his competitors in Amateur Athletic Union (AAU) play, but he could shoot and score because he practiced frequently. As a freshman at Susquehanna Township High School, Proctor stood 5 feet 10 inches (1.78 m). He scored 50 points in a game during his freshman season. Proctor transferred to Harrisburg High School as a sophomore, where his father was an assistant coach, and grew to 6 feet 3 inches (1.91 m). He posted 13.5 points per game as a sophomore. He averaged 21.5 points, 5.9 rebounds, 2.9 assists and 2.4 steals per game as a junior, leading the team to the Mid-Penn's Commonwealth Division championship and a spot in the District 3-AAAA playoffs.

As a senior, Proctor averaged 24.4 points, 8.5 rebounds, and 4.5 assists per game. He scored at least 40 points in three games and led the Cougars to the state quarterfinals and a 22–9 record. Proctor scored 1,739 points in three seasons at Harrisburg, becoming the program's all-time leading scorer. He became the first player in school history to earn three All-State selections, and the third to receive first team honors, which he did as a senior. Proctor initially signed with Holy Cross Crusaders men's basketball over offers from several other Patriot League and Ivy League programs in November 2014, but reopened his recruitment after Holy Cross coach Milan Brown was fired. He committed to play college basketball for Iona during his initial visit, choosing the Gaels over Manhattan and Robert Morris.

== College career ==
On December 1, 2015, Proctor scored a freshman season-high 20 points in a 101–77 win over Fairfield. As a freshman, he averaged 5.1 points, 2.0 rebounds and 1.1 assists per game. He made four starts, helping Iona win the Metro Atlantic Athletic Conference tournament and qualify for the NCAA Tournament. However, Proctor found it difficult to connect with the coaching staff and opted to transfer to High Point in large part because of another Harrisburg player on the roster.

Proctor scored a sophomore season-high 29 points in an 80–59 win against Charleston Southern on January 6, 2018. Proctor averaged 16.4 points, 3.6 rebounds, and 3.0 assists per game as a redshirt sophomore. He was named to the Second Team All-Big South. On December 17, 2018, Proctor scored a career-high 35 points with nine assists and five steals as High Point beat NCAA Division III team NC Wesleyan 90–85 in overtime. As a junior at High Point, Proctor averaged 19.5 points, 3.8 rebounds and 3.3 assists per game. Proctor shot 31.8 percent from three-point range, owing largely to his playing through a shoulder injury, but he improved his shooting at the end of the season because he discovered a rehabilitation technique. Proctor earned Second Team All-Big South honors and was named Big South Scholar-Athlete of the Year. After the season he decided to transfer to Purdue as a graduate transfer, choosing the Boilermakers due to strong impressions from strength and conditioning personnel, business professors and other athletes in his field of study.

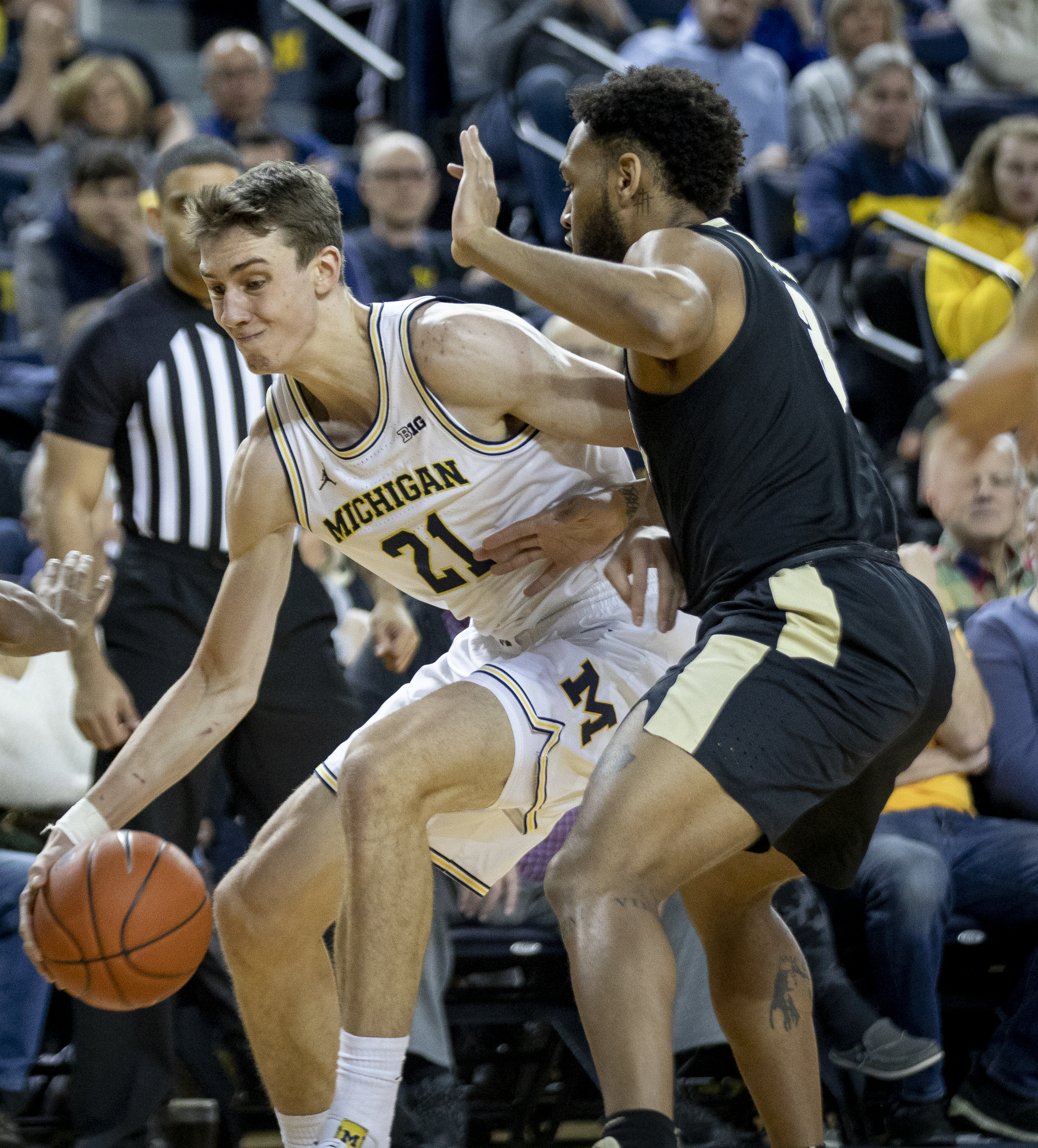
Proctor defending Franz Wagner of Michigan

Proctor helped to replace the departing Purdue backcourt members Carsen Edwards and Ryan Cline. In his first game for Purdue, Proctor scored a season-high 26 points and collected five rebounds in a 79–57 win against Green Bay. Proctor posted 16 points, four rebounds, four steals, and an assist on December 4, 2019, in a 69–40 upset of fifth-ranked Virginia. He averaged 9.0 points, 2.3 rebounds and 1.7 assists per game as a redshirt senior. The season was cancelled prior to the Big Ten Tournament due to the COVID-19 pandemic, and Purdue finished 16–15 overall and 9–11 in the Big Ten Conference.

== Professional career ==
On July 16, 2020, Proctor signed with Vilpas Vikings of the Finnish Korisliiga. In his debut for Vilpas on October 14, he had 18 points and four rebounds in a 78–76 loss to Lahti Basketball. In 2021, Proctor signed with the Kirchheim Knights of the German ProA. He joined the York Mighty Ants of the Triple Threat Basketball League in 2023.

== Career statistics ==
Legend
GP	Games played	GS	Games started	MPG	Minutes per game
FG%	Field goal percentage	3P%	3-point field goal percentage	FT%	Free throw percentage
RPG	Rebounds per game	APG	Assists per game	SPG	Steals per game
BPG	Blocks per game	PPG	Points per game	**Bold**	Career high

=== College ===
Year	Team	GP	GS	MPG	FG%	3P%	FT%	RPG	APG	SPG	BPG	PPG
2015–16	Iona	**32**	5	15.2	.459	.283	.706	2.0	1.1	.4	.1	5.1
2016–17	High Point	Redshirt										
2017–18	High Point	25	23	31.9	.432	**.382**	.784	3.6	3.0	1.0	.3	16.4
2018–19	High Point	31	**31**	**34.6**	**.464**	.331	.771	**3.8**	**3.3**	**1.3**	**.4**	**19.5**
2019–20	Purdue	31	18	25.6	.402	.318	**.812**	2.3	1.7	1.0	.1	9.0
Career		119	77	26.5	.441	.338	.776	2.9	2.2	.9	.2	12.2

== Personal life ==
Proctor is the son of Joseph and Tracy Proctor. His father is a math teacher at William Penn Senior High School in York, Pennsylvania and a baggage handler for Delta Air Lines at Harrisburg International Airport. Proctor's name is derived from "jahad", the Arabic word for warrior. His sister Sabre played basketball at North Carolina A&T and Stony Brook. Proctor has a daughter, Jolene, born in November 2014. He has her footprints tattooed on his calf, a tattoo of a lion on his right arm and the words "Dream" and "Believe" tattooed on the top and bottom of his wrist.
