= Shawn Lee Jr. =

American football player

No. 28 – Pittsburgh Panthers
- Position: Cornerback
- Class: Sophomore

Personal information
- Listed height: 5 ft 10 in (1.78 m)
- Listed weight: 180 lb (82 kg)

Career information
- High school: Harrisburg (Harrisburg, Pennsylvania); Milford Academy (New Berlin, New York)
- College: Pittsburgh (2025–present)
- Stats at ESPN

Shawn Lee Jr. is an American college football cornerback for the Pittsburgh Panthers.

== Early life ==
Lee is from Harrisburg, Pennsylvania, and his father, Shawn Lee Sr., played college football for the Penn State Nittany Lions. He attended Harrisburg High School where he played football as a quarterback and cornerback, winning three straight District 3 championships while leading the team to the 6A state championship in 2022. In 2023, he was named Class 6A All-State after throwing for 26 touchdowns while running for 1,451 yards and nine touchdowns, in addition to posting four interceptions.

Lee was ruled ineligible for the 2024 season by the Pennsylvania Interscholastic Athletic Association (PIAA) as he had taken classes at Harrisburg since 2020, even though he did not play football that year. After his eligibility ruling, he transferred to Milford Academy in New Berlin, New York, for the 2024 season. A three-star recruit, he committed to play college football for the Pittsburgh Panthers.

== College career ==
Lee entered Pittsburgh as an early enrollee in 2025. He started his true freshman season as one of their top backups at cornerback. Within a few games, he was named full-time starter. On November 1, against the Stanford Cardinal, he returned an interception 30 yards for his first career touchdown.
