= 2025 Kentucky Wildcats football team =

American college football season

2025 Kentucky Wildcats football
- Conference: Southeastern Conference
- Record: 5–7 (2–6 SEC)
- Head coach: Mark Stoops (13th season)
- Offensive coordinator: Bush Hamdan (2nd season)
- Offensive scheme: Multiple pro-style
- Defensive coordinator: Brad White (7th season)
- Base defense: Multiple
- Home stadium: Kroger Field

2025 Southeastern Conference football standings
| | Conf. | | | Overall |
| Team | W | | L | W | | L |
|---|---|---|---|---|---|---|
| No. 9 Alabama y^ | 7 | – | 1 | 11 | – | 4 |
| No. 6 Georgia y$^ | 7 | – | 1 | 12 | – | 2 |
| No. 3 Ole Miss ^ | 7 | – | 1 | 13 | – | 2 |
| No. 8 Texas A&M ^ | 7 | – | 1 | 11 | – | 2 |
| No. 13 Oklahoma ^ | 6 | – | 2 | 10 | – | 3 |
| No. 12 Texas | 6 | – | 2 | 10 | – | 3 |
| No. 15 Vanderbilt | 6 | – | 2 | 10 | – | 3 |
| Missouri | 4 | – | 4 | 8 | – | 5 |
| Tennessee | 4 | – | 4 | 8 | – | 5 |
| LSU | 3 | – | 5 | 7 | – | 6 |
| Kentucky | 2 | – | 6 | 5 | – | 7 |
| Florida | 2 | – | 6 | 4 | – | 8 |
| Auburn | 1 | – | 7 | 5 | – | 7 |
| Mississippi State | 1 | – | 7 | 5 | – | 8 |
| South Carolina | 1 | – | 7 | 4 | – | 8 |
| Arkansas | 0 | – | 8 | 2 | – | 10 |
Championship: Georgia 28, Alabama 7
^ – College Football Playoff participant; $ – Conference champion; y – Championship game participant; Rankings from AP Poll

The 2025 Kentucky Wildcats football team represented the University of Kentucky in the Southeastern Conference (SEC) during the 2025 NCAA Division I FBS football season. The Wildcats were led by Mark Stoops in his 13th and final year as their head coach. The Kentucky football team played its home games at Kroger Field located in Lexington, Kentucky.

After the season ended, Mark Stoops was fired after finishing bowl ineligible for the second consecutive year. He left Kentucky with an overall record of 82–80, the winningest head coach in Kentucky's football history.

The Kentucky Wildcats drew an average home attendance of 57,779, the highest of all American football teams from Kentucky.

== Schedule ==
| Date | Time | Opponent | Site | TV | Result | Attendance |
|---|---|---|---|---|---|---|
| August 30 | 12:45 p.m. | Toledo* | Kroger Field; Lexington, KY | SECN | W 24–16 | 56,457 |
| September 6 | 3:30 p.m. | No. 20 Ole Miss | Kroger Field; Lexington, KY | ABC | L 23–30 | 58,346 |
| September 13 | 7:30 p.m. | Eastern Michigan* | Kroger Field; Lexington, KY | ESPNU | W 48–23 | 58,489 |
| September 27 | 7:45 p.m. | at South Carolina | Williams–Brice Stadium; Columbia, SC | SECN | L 13–35 | 79,266 |
| October 4 | 12:00 p.m. | at No. 12 Georgia | Sanford Stadium; Athens, GA | ABC/SECN | L 14–35 | 93,033 |
| October 18 | 7:00 p.m. | No. 21 Texas^{†} | Kroger Field; Lexington, KY | ESPN | L 13–16 ^{OT} | 60,937 |
| October 25 | 7:45 p.m. | No. 17 Tennessee | Kroger Field; Lexington, KY (rivalry) | SECN | L 34–56 | 60,153 |
| November 1 | 7:30 p.m. | at Auburn | Jordan-Hare Stadium; Auburn, AL | SECN | W 10–3 | 88,043 |
| November 8 | 7:30 p.m. | Florida | Kroger Field; Lexington, KY (rivalry) | SECN | W 38–7 | 56,388 |
| November 15 | 1:30 p.m. | No. 5 (FCS) Tennessee Tech* | Kroger Field; Lexington, KY | SECN+/ESPN+ | W 42–10 | 53,686 |
| November 22 | 3:30 p.m. | at No. 14 Vanderbilt | FirstBank Stadium; Nashville, TN (rivalry) | ESPN | L 17–45 | 35,000 |
| November 29 | 12:00 p.m. | at Louisville* | L&N Federal Credit Union Stadium; Louisville, KY (Governor's Cup) | ACCN | L 0–41 | 50,634 |
*Non-conference game; ^{†}Homecoming; Rankings from AP Poll (and CFP Rankings, after November 4) - Released prior to game; All times are in Eastern time

== Game summaries ==
=== vs Toledo ===
Toledo Rockets (0–0) at Kentucky Wildcats (0–0) – Game summary

| Quarter | 1 | 2 | 3 | 4 | Total |
|---|---|---|---|---|---|
| Rockets | 0 | 2 | 0 | 14 | 16 |
| Wildcats | 7 | 3 | 0 | 14 | 24 |

at Kroger Field • Lexington, Kentucky

- Date: August 30
- Game time: 12:45 PM EDT
- Game attendance: 56,457
- Referee: Kyle Olson
- TV announcers (SECN): Taylor Zarzour (play-by-play), Matt Stinchcomb (analyst), and Alyssa Lang (sideline)

Game information

First quarter

- UK – Zach Calzada 1-yard run (Jacob Kauwe kick), 6:27. Wildcats 7–0. Drive: 7 plays, 29 yards, 3:38.

Second quarter

- TOL – Langston Long Safety, 13:08. Wildcats 7–2.
- UK – Jacob Kauwe 45-yard field goal, 2:04. Wildcats 10–2. Drive: 10 plays, 23 yards, 5:24.

Third quarter

No scoring plays.

Fourth quarter

- UK – Seth McGowan 6-yard run (Jacob Kauwe kick), 12:30. Wildcats 17–2. Drive: 12 plays, 76 yards, 6:27.
- TOL – Tucker Gleason 9-yard run (Dylan Cunanan kick), 9:38. Wildcats 17–9. Drive: 7 plays, 69 yards, 2:45.
- UK – Dante Dowdell 79-yard run (Jacob Kauwe kick), 9:22. Wildcats 24–9. Drive: 1 play, 79 yards, 0:12.
- TOL – Junior Vandeross III 20-yard pass from Tucker Gleason (Dylan Cunanan kick), 1:55. Wildcats 24–16. Drive: 7 plays, 95 yards, 2:28.

| Statistics | TOL | UK |
|---|---|---|
| First downs | 17 | 17 |
| Plays–yards | 69–329 | 66–305 |
| Rushes–yards | 29–59 | 43–220 |
| Passing yards | 270 | 85 |
| Passing: comp–att–int | 23–40–1 | 10–23–1 |
| Turnovers | 1 | 2 |
| Time of possession | 28:19 | 31:41 |

| Team | Category | Player | Statistics |
|---|---|---|---|
| Toledo | Passing | Tucker Gleason | 23/40, 270 yards, TD, INT |
| Toledo | Rushing | Chip Trayanum | 14 carries, 41 yards |
| Toledo | Receiving | Junior Vandeross III | 7 receptions, 88 yards, TD |
| Kentucky | Passing | Zach Calzada | 10/23, 85 yards, INT |
| Kentucky | Rushing | Dante Dowdell | 14 carries, 129 yards, TD |
| Kentucky | Receiving | Josh Kattus | 3 receptions, 43 yards |

=== vs No. 20 Ole Miss ===
No. 20 Ole Miss Rebels (1–0) at Kentucky Wildcats (1–0) – Game summary

| Quarter | 1 | 2 | 3 | 4 | Total |
|---|---|---|---|---|---|
| No. 20 Rebels | 0 | 17 | 10 | 3 | 30 |
| Wildcats | 7 | 6 | 7 | 3 | 23 |

at Kroger Field • Lexington, Kentucky

- Date: September 6
- Game time: 3:30 p.m.
- Game weather: Cloudy
- Game attendance: 58,346
- Referee: David Smith
- TV announcers (ABC): Sean McDonough (play-by-play), Greg McElroy (analyst), and Molly McGrath (sideline)

Game information

First quarter

- UK – Seth McGowan 9-yard run (Jacob Kauwe kick), 1:55. Wildcats 7–0. Drive: 8 plays, 31 yards, 4:19.

Second quarter

- UK – Jacob Kauwe 33-yard field goal, 14:17. Wildcats 10–0. Drive: 5 plays, 17 yards, 1:33.
- MISS – Kewan Lacy 1-yard run (Lucas Carneiro kick), 12:25. Wildcats 10–7. Drive: 6 plays, 75 yards, 1:52.
- MISS – Damien Taylor 1-yard run (Lucas Carneiro kick), 8:24. Rebels 14–10. Drive: 8 plays, 70 yards, 2:49.
- UK – Jacob Kauwe 31-yard field goal, 4:31. Rebels 14–13. Drive: 10 plays, 62 yards, 3:53.
- MISS – Lucas Carneiro 43-yard field goal, 1:05. Rebels 17–13. Drive: 8 plays, 50 yards, 3:26.

Third quarter

- MISS – Lucas Carneiro 28-yard field goal, 8:48. Rebels 20–13. Drive: 9 plays, 61 yards, 3:39.
- UK – Seth McGowan 8-yard run (Jacob Kauwe kick), 5:38. Tied 20–20. Drive: 6 plays, 75 yards, 3:10.
- MISS – Austin Simmons 7-yard run (Lucas Carniero kick), 2:20. Rebels 27–20. Drive: 8 plays, 75 yards, 3:18.

Fourth quarter

- MISS – Lucas Carniero 36-yard field goal, 1:10. Rebels 30–20. Drive: 9 plays, 50 yards, 3:01.
- UK – Jacob Kauwe 39-yard field goal, 0:08. Rebels 30–23. Drive: 5 plays, 54 yards, 1:02.

| Statistics | MISS | UK |
|---|---|---|
| First downs | 20 | 18 |
| Plays–yards | 72–455 | 70–359 |
| Rushes–yards | 48–220 | 37–172 |
| Passing yards | 235 | 187 |
| Passing: comp–att–int | 13–24–2 | 16–33–0 |
| Turnovers | 2 | 0 |
| Time of possession | 27:47 | 32:13 |

| Team | Category | Player | Statistics |
|---|---|---|---|
| Ole Miss | Passing | Austin Simmons | 13/24, 235 yards, 2 INT |
| Ole Miss | Rushing | Kewan Lacy | 28 carries, 138 yards, TD |
| Ole Miss | Receiving | Harrison Wallace III | 4 receptions, 117 yards |
| Kentucky | Passing | Zach Calzada | 15/30, 149 yards |
| Kentucky | Rushing | Seth McGowan | 15 carries, 93 yards, 2 TD |
| Kentucky | Receiving | Ja'Mori Maclin | 2 receptions, 59 yards |

=== vs Eastern Michigan ===
Eastern Michigan Eagles (0–2) at Kentucky Wildcats (1–1) – Game summary

| Quarter | 1 | 2 | 3 | 4 | Total |
|---|---|---|---|---|---|
| Eagles | 3 | 13 | 0 | 7 | 23 |
| Wildcats | 14 | 14 | 10 | 10 | 48 |

at Kroger Field • Lexington, Kentucky

- Date: September 13
- Game time: 7:30 p.m.
- Game weather: Clear, 79 F
- Game attendance: 58,489
- Referee: Ken Williamson
- TV announcers (ESPNU): Clay Matvick (play-by-play) and Chase Daniel (analyst)

Game information

First quarter

- UK – Seth McGowan 4 yard-run (Jacob Kauwe kick), 14:11. Wildcats 7–0. Drive: 2 plays, 10 yards, 0:39.
- UK – Seth McGowan 12-yard run (Jacob Kauwe kick), 5:32. Wildcats 14–0. Drive: 11 plays, 79 yards, 5:09.
- EMU – Rudy Kessinger 38-yard field goal, 02:20. Wildcats 14–3. Drive: 8 plays, 55 yards, 3:12.

Second quarter

- UK – Willie Rodriguez 3-yard pass from Cutter Boley (Jacob Kauwe kick), 10:18. Wildcats 21–3. Drive: 5 plays, 54 yards, 1:52.
- EMU – Rudy Kessinger 37-yard field goal, 5:19. Wildcats 21–6. Drive: 10 plays, 56 yards, 4:59.
- UK – Josh Kattus 4-yard pass from Cutter Boley (Jacob Kauwe kick), 1:55. Wildcats 28–6. Drive: 7 plays, 75 yards, 3:23.
- EMU – Terry Lockett Jr. 64-yard pass from Noah Kim (Rudy Kessinger kick), 1:36. Wildcats 28–13. Drive: 3 plays, 75 yards, 0:19.
- EMU – Rudy Kessinger 50-yard field goal, 0:03. Wildcats 28–16. Drive: 5 plays, 34 yards, 0:47.

Third quarter

- UK – Jacob Kauwe 51-yard field goal, 8:13. Wildcats 31–16. Drive: 7 plays, 30 yards, 2:38.
- UK – Seth McGowan 8-yard run (J.Kauwe kick), 5:15. Wildcats 38–16. Drive: 4 plays, 27 yards, 1:21.

Fourth quarter

- UK – Jacob Kauwe 24-yard field goal, 13:16, Wildcats 41–16. Drive: 7 plays, 51 yards, 3:38.
- UK – Jason Patterson 6-yard run (Jacob Kauwe kick), 4:46. Wildcats 48–16. Drive: 10 plays, 63 yards, 5:20.
- EMU – Noah Kim 5-yard run (Rudy Kessinger kick), 0:58. Wildcats 48–23. Drive: 12 plays, 75 yards, 3:48.

| Statistics | EMU | UK |
|---|---|---|
| First downs | 21 | 24 |
| Plays–yards | 77-461 | 69-492 |
| Rushes–yards | 30-131 | 46-252 |
| Passing yards | 330 | 240 |
| Passing: comp–att–int | 25-43-1 | 12-21-0 |
| Turnovers | 1 | 0 |
| Time of possession | 30:04 | 29:55 |

| Team | Category | Player | Statistics |
|---|---|---|---|
| Eastern Michigan | Passing | Noah Kim | 25/42, 330 yards, TD, INT |
| Eastern Michigan | Rushing | Dontae McMillan | 13 carries, 83 yards |
| Eastern Michigan | Receiving | Terry Lockett Jr. | 3 receptions, 90 yards, TD |
| Kentucky | Passing | Cutter Boley | 12/21, 240 yards, 2 TD |
| Kentucky | Rushing | Seth McGowan | 18 carries, 104 yards, 3 TD |
| Kentucky | Receiving | Josh Kattus | 3 receptions, 61 yards, TD |

=== at South Carolina ===
Kentucky Wildcats (2–1) at South Carolina Gamecocks (2–2) – Game summary

| Quarter | 1 | 2 | 3 | 4 | Total |
|---|---|---|---|---|---|
| Wildcats | 10 | 0 | 3 | 0 | 13 |
| Gamecocks | 7 | 21 | 0 | 7 | 35 |

at Williams–Brice Stadium • Columbia, South Carolina

- Date: September 27
- Game time: 7:45 p.m.
- Game weather: Cloudy • Temperature: 75 °F (24 °C) • Wind: W at 1 mile per hour (1.6 km/h)
- Game attendance: 79,266
- Referee: Matt Loeffler
- TV announcers (SECN): Tom Hart (play-by-play), Jordan Rodgers (analyst) and Cole Cubelic (sideline)

Game information

First quarter

- (11:27) UK – Seth McGowan 20-yard run, Jacob Kauwe kick (Drive: 8 plays, 65 yards, 3:33; Kentucky 7–0)
- (5:48) SC – Rahsul Faison 12-yard run, William Joyce kick (Drive: 12 plays, 75 yards, 5:39; Tied 7–7)
- (0:58) UK – Jacob Kauwe 27-yard field goal (Drive: 9 plays, 76 yards, 4:48; Kentucky 10–7)

Second quarter

- (11:28) SC – Jatius Geer 41-yard fumble return, William Joyce kick (Drive: 0 plays, 0 yards, 2:37; South Carolina 14–10)
- (10:43) SC – Gerald Kilgore 45-yard interception return, William Joyce kick (Drive: 0 plays, 0 yards, 0:45; South Carolina 21–10)
- (1:07) SC – Rahsul Faison 6-yard run, William Joyce kick (Drive: 5 plays, 43 yards, 0:58; South Carolina 28–10)

Third quarter

- (0:34) UK – Jacob Kauwe 42-yard field goal (Drive: 7 plays, 15 yards, 3:30; South Carolina 28–13)

Fourth quarter

- (12:14) SC – Matt Fuller 1-yard run, William Joyce kick (Drive: 8 plays, 84 yards, 3:14; South Carolina 35–13)

| Statistics | UK | SC |
|---|---|---|
| First downs | 14 | 19 |
| Plays–yards | 60–232 | 63–341 |
| Rushes–yards | 41–108 | 48–178 |
| Passing yards | 124 | 163 |
| Passing: comp–att–int | 10–19–2 | 12–15–0 |
| Turnovers | 4 | 0 |
| Time of possession | 28:57 | 31:03 |

| Team | Category | Player | Statistics |
|---|---|---|---|
| Kentucky | Passing | Cutter Boley | 10/19, 124 yards, 2 INT |
| Kentucky | Rushing | Seth McGowan | 17 carries, 112 yards, TD |
| Kentucky | Receiving | Willie Rodriguez | 2 receptions, 66 yards |
| South Carolina | Passing | LaNorris Sellers | 11/14, 153 yards |
| South Carolina | Rushing | LaNorris Sellers | 14 carries, 81 yards |
| South Carolina | Receiving | Vandrevius Jacobs | 5 receptions, 108 yards |

=== at No. 12 Georgia ===
Kentucky Wildcats (2–2) at No. 12 Georgia Bulldogs (3–1) – Game summary

| Quarter | 1 | 2 | 3 | 4 | Total |
|---|---|---|---|---|---|
| Wildcats | 0 | 7 | 0 | 7 | 14 |
| No. 12 Bulldogs | 14 | 7 | 14 | 0 | 35 |

at Sanford Stadium • Athens, Georgia

- Date: October 4
- Game time: 12:00 p.m.
- Game weather: 73 °F (23 °C)
- Game attendance:
- Referee: Jeff Heaser
- TV announcers (ABC): Joe Tessitore (play-by-play), Jesse Palmer (analyst), and Katie George (sideline)

Game information

First quarter

- (8:51) UGA – Gunner Stockton-7 yard run, Peyton Woodring kick (Drive: 12 plays, 75 yards, 6:09; Georgia 7–0)
- (0:55) UGA – Gunner Stockton 6-yard run, Peyton Woodring kick (Drive: 13 plays, 96 yards, 5:15; Georgia 14–0)

Second quarter

- (14:21) UK – Josh Kattus 29-yard pass from Cutter Boley, Jacob Kauwe kick (Drive: 4 plays, 75 yards, 1:34; Georgia 14–7)
- (2:45) UGA – Dillon Bell 3-yard run, Peyton Woodring kick (Drive: 6 plays, 40 yards, 2:49; Georgia 21–7)

Third quarter

- (2:45) UGA – Dillon Bell 3-yard run, Peyton Woodring kick (Drive: 5 plays, 38 yards, 2:21; Georgia 28–7)
- (4:23) UGA – Cash Jones 16-yard pass from Gunner Stockton, Peyton Woodring kick (Drive: 9 plays, 71 yards, 4:38; Georgia 35–7)

Fourth quarter

- (1:51) UK – Kendrick Law 5-yard pass from Cutter Boley, Jacob Kauwe kick (Drive: 3 plays, 23 yards, 0:31; Georgia 35–14)

| Statistics | UK | UGA |
|---|---|---|
| First downs | 19 | 26 |
| Plays–yards | 64–270 | 71–425 |
| Rushes–yards | 22–45 | 44–180 |
| Passing yards | 225 | 245 |
| Passing: comp–att–int | 25–42–1 | 18–27–2 |
| Turnovers | 2 | 2 |
| Time of possession | 26:20 | 33:40 |

| Team | Category | Player | Statistics |
|---|---|---|---|
| Kentucky | Passing | Cutter Boley | 25/41, 225 yards, 2 TD, INT |
| Kentucky | Rushing | Seth McGowan | 11 carries, 44 yards |
| Kentucky | Receiving | Kendrick Law | 6 receptions, 64 yards, TD |
| Georgia | Passing | Gunner Stockton | 15/23, 196 yards, TD, INT |
| Georgia | Rushing | Chauncey Bowens | 15 carries, 70 yards |
| Georgia | Receiving | Dillon Bell | 4 receptions, 68 yards |

=== vs No. 21 Texas ===
No. 21 Texas Longhorns (4–2) at Kentucky Wildcats (2–3) – Game summary

| Quarter | 1 | 2 | 3 | 4 | OT | Total |
|---|---|---|---|---|---|---|
| No. 21 Longhorns | 0 | 7 | 3 | 3 | 3 | 16 |
| Wildcats | 0 | 0 | 3 | 10 | 0 | 13 |

at Kroger Field • Lexington, Kentucky

- Date: October 18
- Game time: 7:00 p.m.
- Game weather:
- Game attendance: 60,937
- Referee: Steve Marlowe
- TV announcers (ESPN): Dave Flemming (play-by-play), Brock Osweiler (analyst), and Stormy Buonantony (sideline)

Game information

First quarter

- No scoring

Second quarter

- (6:22) TEX – Quintrevion Wisner 1-yard run (Mason Shipley kick), (Drive: 3 plays, 5 yards, 0:46; Texas 7–0)

Third quarter

- (4:09) UK – Jacob Kauwe 46-yard field goal (Drive: 15 plays, 53 yards, 8:44; Texas 7–3)
- (2:05) TEX – Mason Shipley 53-yard field goal (Drive: 6 plays, 40 yards, 2:04; Texas 10–3)

Fourth quarter

- (12:04) UK – Cutter Boley 16-yard run (Jacob Kauwe kick), (Drive: 5 plays, 56 yards, 2:44; Tied 10–10)
- (0:57) TEX – Mason Shipley 39-yard field goal (Drive: 7 plays, 21 yards, 1:39; Texas 13–10)
- (0:09) UK – Jacob Kauwe 45-yard field goal (Drive: 7 plays, 46 yards, 0:42; Tied 13–13)

Overtime

- TEX – Mason Shipley 45-yard field goal (Drive: 4 plays, -2 yards; Texas 16–13)

| Statistics | TEX | UK |
|---|---|---|
| First downs | 8 | 26 |
| Plays–yards | 55–179 | 86–395 |
| Rushes–yards | 28–47 | 46–137 |
| Passing yards | 132 | 258 |
| Passing: comp–att–int | 12–27–0 | 31–40–1 |
| Turnovers | 0 | 1 |
| Time of possession | 20:37 | 39:23 |

| Team | Category | Player | Statistics |
|---|---|---|---|
| Texas | Passing | Arch Manning | 12/27, 132 yards |
| Texas | Rushing | Quintrevion Wisner | 12 carries, 37 yards, TD |
| Texas | Receiving | DeAndre Moore Jr. | 3 receptions, 37 yards |
| Kentucky | Passing | Cutter Boley | 31/39, 258 yards, INT |
| Kentucky | Rushing | Cutter Boley | 14 carries, 45 yards, TD |
| Kentucky | Receiving | Seth McGowan | 7 receptions, 68 yards |

=== vs No. 17 Tennessee (rivalry) ===
No. 17 Tennessee Volunteers (5–2) at Kentucky Wildcats (2–4) – Game summary

| Quarter | 1 | 2 | 3 | 4 | Total |
|---|---|---|---|---|---|
| No. 17 Volunteers | 21 | 14 | 14 | 7 | 56 |
| Wildcats | 7 | 14 | 6 | 7 | 34 |

at Kroger Field • Lexington, Kentucky

- Date: October 25
- Game time: 7:45 p.m.
- Game weather: Cloudy • Temperature: 53 °F (12 °C)
- Game attendance: 60,153
- Referee: Kyle Olson
- TV announcers (SECN): Tom Hart (play-by-play), Jordan Rodgers (analyst), and Cole Cubelic (sideline)

Game information

First quarter

- TENN - Chris Brazzell II 35-yard pass from Joey Aguilar (Max Gilbert kick), 13:41. Volunteers 7-0. Drive: 4 plays, 75 yards, 1:19.
- TENN - Edrees Farooq 45-yard interception return (Max Gilbert kick), 6:56. Volunteers 14-0.
- UK - Kendrick Law 71-yard pass from Cutter Boley (Jacob Kauwe kick), 6:19. Volunteers 14-7. Drive: 2 plays, 75 yards, 0:37.
- TENN - Star Thomas 1-yard run (Max Gilbert kick), 1:49. Volunteers 21-7. Drive: 5 plays, 72 yards, 2:11.

Second quarter

- TENN - DeSean Bishop 1-yard run (Max Gilbert kick), 13:52. Volunteers 28-7. Drive: 4 plays, 6 yards, 1:15.
- UK - DJ Miller 56-yard pass from Cutter Boley (Jacob Kauwe kick), 12:39. Volunteers 28-14. Drive: 3 plays, 75 yards, 1:13.
- UK - J.J. Hester 3-yard pass from Cutter Boley (Jacob Kauwe kick), 1:37. Volunteers 28-21. Drive: 16 plays, 96 yards, 8:35.
- TENN - Ethan Davis 13-yard pass from Joey Aguilar (Max Gilbert kick), 0:05. Volunteers 35-21. Drive: 10 plays, 75 yards, 1:32.

Third quarter

- TENN - Mike Matthews 62-yard pass from Joey Aguilar (Max Gilbert kick), 10:40. Volunteers 42-21. Drive: 2 plays, 70 yards, 0:25.
- TENN - Peyton Lewis 2-yard run (Max Gilbert kick), 5:46. Volunteers 49-21. Drive: 5 plays, 63 yards, 1:29.
- UK - DJ Miller 28-yard pass from Cutter Boley (Two-Point pass Conversion failed), 0:54. Volunteers 49-27. Drive: 10 plays, 75 yards, 4:52.

Fourth quarter

- TENN - DeSean Bishop 5-yard run (Max Gilbert kick), 13:35. Volunteers 56-27. Drive: 6 plays, 75 yards, 2:19.
- UK - J.J. Hester 7-yard pass from Cutter Boley (Jacob Kauwe kick), 8:12. Volunteers 56-34. Drive: 11 plays, 75 yards, 5:23.

| Statistics | TENN | UK |
|---|---|---|
| First downs | 24 | 25 |
| Plays–yards | 59–504 | 73–476 |
| Rushes–yards | 33–108 | 38–146 |
| Passing yards | 396 | 330 |
| Passing: comp–att–int | 20–26–0 | 26–36–1 |
| Turnovers | 0 | 2 |
| Time of possession | 23:56 | 36:03 |

| Team | Category | Player | Statistics |
|---|---|---|---|
| Tennessee | Passing | Joey Aguilar | 20/26, 396 yards, 3 TD |
| Tennessee | Rushing | Star Thomas | 10 carries, 64 yards, TD |
| Tennessee | Receiving | Chris Brazzell II | 4 receptions, 138 yards, TD |
| Kentucky | Passing | Cutter Boley | 26/35, 330 yards, 5 TD, INT |
| Kentucky | Rushing | Dante Dowdell | 12 carries, 52 yards |
| Kentucky | Receiving | DJ Miller | 5 receptions, 120 yards, 2 TD |

=== at Auburn ===
Kentucky Wildcats (2–5) at Auburn Tigers (4–4) – Game summary

| Quarter | 1 | 2 | 3 | 4 | Total |
|---|---|---|---|---|---|
| Wildcats | 0 | 3 | 7 | 0 | 10 |
| Tigers | 0 | 3 | 0 | 0 | 3 |

at Jordan-Hare Stadium • Auburn, Alabama

- Date: November 1
- Game time: 7:30 p.m. EDT
- Game weather:
- Game attendance:
- Referee: David Smith
- TV announcers (SECN): Tom Hart (play-by-play), Cole Cubelic (analyst) and Alyssa Lang (reporter)

Game information

First quarter

- No scoring plays.

Second quarter

- UK – Jacob Kauwe 48-yard field goal, 11:40. Kentucky 3–0. Drive: 9 plays, 44 yards, 4:10.
- AUB – Alex McPherson 27-yard field goal, 0:02. Tied 3–3. Drive: 7 plays, 26 yards, 0:58.

Third quarter

- UK – Kendrick Law 13-yard pass from Cutter Boley (Jacob Kauwe kick), 9:27. Kentucky 10–3. Drive: 10 plays, 75 yards, 5:33.

Fourth quarter

- No scoring plays.

| Statistics | UK | AUB |
|---|---|---|
| First downs | 16 | 17 |
| Plays–yards | 61–240 | 71–241 |
| Rushes–yards | 32–79 | 40–118 |
| Passing yards | 161 | 123 |
| Passing: comp–att–int | 18–29–2 | 15–31–1 |
| Turnovers | 2 | 2 |
| Time of possession | 31:46 | 28:14 |

| Team | Category | Player | Statistics |
|---|---|---|---|
| Kentucky | Passing | Cutter Boley | 18/29, 161 yards, TD, 2 INT |
| Kentucky | Rushing | Seth McGowan | 21 carries, 53 yards |
| Kentucky | Receiving | Kendrick Law | 6 receptions, 49 yards, TD |
| Auburn | Passing | Ashton Daniels | 13/28, 108 yards, INT |
| Auburn | Rushing | Jeremiah Cobb | 20 carries, 72 yards |
| Auburn | Receiving | Cam Coleman | 5 receptions, 34 yards |

=== vs Florida (rivalry) ===
Florida Gators (3–5) at Kentucky Wildcats (3–5) – Game summary

| Quarter | 1 | 2 | 3 | 4 | Total |
|---|---|---|---|---|---|
| Gators | 7 | 0 | 0 | 0 | 7 |
| Wildcats | 3 | 21 | 7 | 7 | 38 |

at Kroger Field • Lexington, Kentucky

- Date: November 8
- Game time: 7:30 p.m. EST
- Game weather: Clear • Temperature: 54 °F (12 °C) • Wind: S 6 mph
- Game attendance: 56,388
- Referee: Steve Marlowe
- TV announcers (SECN): Tom Hart (play-by-play), Jordan Rodgers (analyst) and Cole Cubelic (sideline)

Game information

First quarter

- (6:42) UK – Jacob Kauwe 39-yard field goal (Drive: 10 plays, 30 yards, 3:52; Kentucky 3–0)
- (1:12) FLA – Jadan Baugh 10-yard pass from DJ Lagway, Trey Smack kick (Drive: 3 plays, 13 yards, 1:10; Florida 7–3)

Second quarter

- (12:39) UK – J.J. Hester 29-yard pass from Cutter Boley, Jacob Kauwe kick (Drive: 9 plays, 75 yards, 3:33; Kentucky 10–7)
- (3:32) UK – Jason Patterson 15-yard pass from Cutter Boley, Jacob Kauwe kick (Drive: 12 plays, 59 yards, 6:11; Kentucky 17–7)
- (1:26) UK – Seth McGowan 2-yard run, Jacob Kauwe kick (Drive: 5 plays, 54 yards, 1:12; Kentucky 24–7)

Third quarter

- (7:34) UK – Seth McGowan 5-yard run, Jacob Kauwe kick (Drive: 13 plays, 75 yards, 7:26; Kentucky 31–7)

Fourth quarter

- (12:16) UK – Dante Dowdell 65-yard run, Jacob Kauwe kick (Drive: 6 plays, 89 yards, 3:15; Kentucky 38–7)

| Statistics | FLA | UK |
|---|---|---|
| First downs | 13 | 22 |
| Plays–yards | 52–189 | 57–379 |
| Rushes–yards | 32–104 | 44–233 |
| Passing yards | 143 | 168 |
| Passing: comp–att–int | 20–37–3 | 18–23–1 |
| Turnovers | 4 | 4 |
| Time of possession | 28:27 | 31:33 |

| Team | Category | Player | Statistics |
|---|---|---|---|
| Florida | Passing | DJ Lagway | 11/19, 83 yards, TD, 3 INT |
| Florida | Rushing | Jadan Baugh | 17 carries, 64 yards |
| Florida | Receiving | J. Michael Sturdivant | 3 receptions, 29 yards |
| Kentucky | Passing | Cutter Boley | 18/23, 168 yards, 2 TD, INT |
| Kentucky | Rushing | Dante Dowdell | 7 carries, 104 yards, TD |
| Kentucky | Receiving | Kendrick Law | 6 receptions, 44 yards |

=== vs No. 5 (FCS) Tennessee Tech ===
No. 5 (FCS) Tennessee Tech Golden Eagles (10–0) at Kentucky Wildcats (4–5) – Game summary

| Quarter | 1 | 2 | 3 | 4 | Total |
|---|---|---|---|---|---|
| No. 5 (FCS) Golden Eagles | 0 | 7 | 3 | 0 | 10 |
| Wildcats | 14 | 14 | 7 | 7 | 42 |

at Kroger Field • Lexington, Kentucky

- Date: November 15
- Game time: 1:30 p.m.
- Game weather:
- Game attendance: 53,686
- Referee: James Carter
- TV announcers (SECN+/ESPN+): Jay Alter (play-by-play) and Rocky Boiman (analyst)

Game information

First quarter

- UK – Seth McGowan 1-yard run (Jacob Kauwe kick), 6:55. Wildcats 7–0. Drive: 11 plays, 88 yards, 6:37.
- UK – Cutter Boley 30-yard run (Jacob Kauwe kick), 2:23. Wildcats 14–0. Drive: 6 plays, 59 yards, 2:10.

Second quarter

- UK – Seth McGowan 4-yard run (Jacob Kauwe kick), 3:46. Wildcats 21–0. Drive: 9 plays, 51 yards, 4:15.
- TNTC – Brian Courtney 8-yard pass from Kekoa Visperas (Dom LeBlanc kick), 1:18. Wildcats 21–7. Drive: 9 plays, 65 yards, 2:28.
- UK – Seth McGowan 1-yard run (Jacob Kauwe kick), 0:19. Wildcats 28–7. Drive: 4 plays, 45 yards, 0:51.

Third quarter

- TNTC – Dom LeBlanc 38-yard field goal, 9:15. Wildcats 28–10. Drive: 8 plays, 40 yards, 4:01.
- UK – Hardley Gilmore IV 45-yard pass from Cutter Boley (Jacob Kauwe kick), 2:24. Wildcats 35–10. Drive: 12 plays, 75 yards, 6:51.

Fourth quarter

- UK – Dante Dowdell 19-yard run (Zach Schreiner kick), 10:37. Wildcats 42–10. Drive: 5 plays, 74 yards, 2:30.

| Statistics | TNTC | UK |
|---|---|---|
| First downs | 15 | 25 |
| Plays–yards | 56–264 | 66–468 |
| Rushes–yards | 33–143 | 39–207 |
| Passing yards | 121 | 261 |
| Passing: comp–att–int | 14–23–1 | 21–27–0 |
| Turnovers | 1 | 0 |
| Time of possession | 27:34 | 32:26 |

| Team | Category | Player | Statistics |
|---|---|---|---|
| Tennessee Tech | Passing | Kekoa Visperas | 13/21, 112 yards, TD, INT |
| Tennessee Tech | Rushing | Kekoa Visperas | 6 carries, 44 yards |
| Tennessee Tech | Receiving | Maury Sullivan | 6 receptions, 63 yards |
| Kentucky | Passing | Cutter Boley | 18/21, 236 yards, TD |
| Kentucky | Rushing | Dante Dowdell | 13 carries, 87 yards, TD |
| Kentucky | Receiving | Kendrick Law | 11 receptions, 124 yards |

=== at No. 14 Vanderbilt (rivalry) ===
Kentucky Wildcats (5–5) at No. 14 Vanderbilt Commodores (8–2) – Game summary

| Quarter | 1 | 2 | 3 | 4 | Total |
|---|---|---|---|---|---|
| Wildcats | 0 | 3 | 0 | 14 | 17 |
| No. 14 Commodores | 3 | 21 | 21 | 0 | 45 |

at FirstBank Stadium • Nashville, Tennessee

- Date: November 22
- Game time: 3:30 p.m. EST
- Game attendance: 35,000
- Referee: Jason McArthur
- TV announcers (ESPN): Mark Jones (play-by-play), Roddy Jones (analyst), and Quint Kessenich (sideline)

Game information

First quarter

- VAN – Brock Taylor 39-yard field goal, 1:05. Commodores 3–0. Drive: 15 plays, 53 yards, 9:48.

Second quarter

- VAN – Tre Richardson 71-yard pass from Diego Pavia (Brock Taylor kick), 13:03. Commodores 10–0. Drive: 4 plays, 86 yards, 1:01.
- VAN – Tre Richardson 15-yard pass from Diego Pavia (Brock Taylor kick), 4:35. Commodores 17–0. Drive: 7 plays, 60 yards, 2:46.
- UK – Jacob Kauwe 47-yard field goal, 0:59. Commodores 17–3. Drive: 4 plays, 4 yards, 0:54.
- VAN – Tre Richardson 56-yard pass from Diego Pavia (Brock Taylor kick), 0:38. Commodores 24–3. Drive: 3 plays, 75 yards, 0:21.

Third quarter

- VAN – Junior Sherrill 7-yard pass from Diego Pavia (Brock Taylor kick), 8:55. Commodores 31–3. Drive: 10 plays, 75 yards, 6:05.
- VAN – Diego Pavia 6-yard run (Brock Taylor kick), 3:14. Commodores 38–3. Drive: 10 plays, 75 yards, 4:17.
- VAN – Richie Hoskins 32-yard pass from Diego Pavia (Brock Taylor kick), 1:17. Commodores 45–3. Drive: 2 plays, 69 yards, 0:31.

Fourth quarter

- UK – J.J. Hester 41-yard pass from Cutter Boley (Jacob Kauwe kick), 13:41. Commodores 45–10. Drive: 8 plays, 75 yards, 2:36.
- UK – Fred Farrier II 9-yard pass from Cutter Boley (Jacob Kauwe kick), 0:02. Commodores 45–17. Drive: 12 plays, 91 yards, 1:58.

| Statistics | UK | VAN |
|---|---|---|
| First downs | 18 | 29 |
| Plays–yards | 80–315 | 69–604 |
| Rushes–yards | 19–31 | 25–65 |
| Passing yards | 284 | 539 |
| Passing: comp–att–int | 29–49–3 | 37–44–1 |
| Turnovers | 3 | 1 |
| Time of possession | 23:47 | 36:13 |

| Team | Category | Player | Statistics |
|---|---|---|---|
| Kentucky | Passing | Cutter Boley | 26–44, 280 yards, 2 TD, 2 INT |
| Kentucky | Rushing | Seth McGowan | 10 carries, 27 yards |
| Kentucky | Receiving | Willie Rodriguez | 6 receptions, 78 yards |
| Vanderbilt | Passing | Diego Pavia | 33–39, 484 yards, 5 TD, INT |
| Vanderbilt | Rushing | Diego Pavia | 15 carries, 48 yards, TD |
| Vanderbilt | Receiving | Tre Richardson | 6 receptions, 159 yards, 3 TD |

=== at Louisville (Governor's Cup) ===
Kentucky Wildcats (5–6) at Louisville Cardinals (7–4) – Game summary

| Quarter | 1 | 2 | 3 | 4 | Total |
|---|---|---|---|---|---|
| Wildcats | 0 | 0 | 0 | 0 | 0 |
| Cardinals | 7 | 13 | 7 | 14 | 41 |

at L&N Federal Credit Union Stadium • Louisville, Kentucky

- Date: November 29
- Game time: 12:00 p.m. EST
- Game weather: Cloudy • Temperature: 36 °F (2 °C) • Wind: SE at 7 miles per hour (11 km/h)
- Game attendance: 50,634
- Referee: Jason Autrey
- TV announcers (ACCN): Jorge Sedano (play-by-play), Rodney McLeod (analyst) and Victoria Arlen (sideline)

Game information

First quarter

- (4:44) LOU – Miller Moss 1-yard run (Cooper Ranvier kick) (Drive: 4 plays, 10 yards, 1:55; Louisville 7–0)

Second quarter

- (14:56) LOU – Cooper Ranvier 34-yard field goal (Drive: 6 plays, 50 yards, 2:11; Louisville 10–0)
- (8:18) LOU – Jacob Stewart 43-yard pass from Miller Moss (Cooper Ranvier kick) (Drive: 8 plays, 80 yards, 2:42; Louisville 17–0)
- (1:45) LOU – Cooper Ranvier 24-yard field goal (Drive: 6 plays, 50 yards, 4:15; Louisville 20–0)

Third quarter

- (8:23) LOU – Shaun Boykins Jr. 5-yard run (Cooper Ranvier kick) (Drive: 2 plays, 15 yards, 0:41; Louisville 27–0)

Fourth quarter

- (10:22) LOU – Dacari Collins 11-yard pass from Miller Moss (Cooper Ranvier kick) (Drive: 17 plays, 99 yards, 10:27; Louisville 34–0)
- (5:23) LOU – Jaleel Skinner 4-yard pass from Miller Moss (Cooper Ranvier kick) (Drive: 6 plays, 30 yards, 4:04; Louisville 41–0)

| Statistics | UK | LOU |
|---|---|---|
| First downs | 10 | 26 |
| Plays–yards | 52–140 | 71–440 |
| Rushes–yards | 26–40 | 50–258 |
| Passing yards | 100 | 182 |
| Passing: comp–att–int | 13–26–2 | 12–21–0 |
| Turnovers | 2 | 0 |
| Time of possession | 23:32 | 36:28 |

| Team | Category | Player | Statistics |
|---|---|---|---|
| Kentucky | Passing | Cutter Boley | 13/26, 100 yards, 2 INT |
| Kentucky | Rushing | Dante Dowdell | 6 carries, 27 yards |
| Kentucky | Receiving | Hardley Gilmore IV | 1 reception, 26 yards |
| Louisville | Passing | Miller Moss | 12/20, 182 yards, 3 TD |
| Louisville | Rushing | Braxton Jennings | 20 carries, 113 yards |
| Louisville | Receiving | Jacob Stewart | 1 reception, 43 yards, TD |
