= Kendrick Law =

American football player (born 2003)

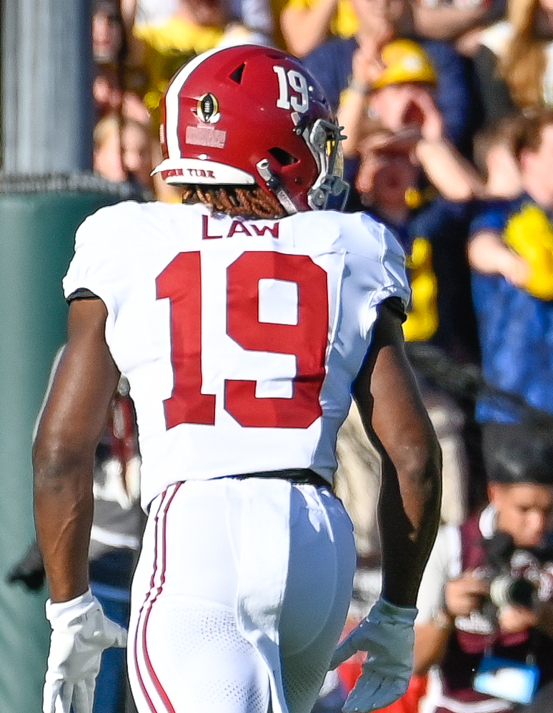
- Law with Alabama at the 2024 Rose Bowl

No. 88 – Detroit Lions
- Position: Wide receiver
- Roster status: Injured reserve

Personal information
- Born: June 13, 2003 (age 23); Warren, Arkansas, U.S.
- Listed height: 5 ft 11 in (1.80 m)
- Listed weight: 203 lb (92 kg)

Career information
- High school: Captain Shreve (Shreveport, Louisiana)
- College: Alabama (2022–2024); Kentucky (2025)
- NFL draft: 2026: 5th round, 168th overall pick

Career history
- Detroit Lions (2026–present)
- Stats at Pro Football Reference

Kendrick Law (born June 13, 2003) is an American professional football wide receiver for the Detroit Lions of the National Football League (NFL). He played college football for the Alabama Crimson Tide and Kentucky Wildcats. Law was selected by the Lions in the fifth round of the 2026 NFL draft.

== Early life ==
Law was born in Warren, Arkansas on June 13, 2003 and was raised in Shreveport, Louisiana. He attended Captain Shreve High School in Shreveport, where he recorded 25 receptions for 423 yards and five touchdowns and rushed for 384 yards and four touchdowns as a senior. He committed to play college football for the Alabama Crimson Tide.

== College career ==
As a freshman in 2022, Law recorded eight receptions for 103 yards and made five tackles on special teams. In week 8 of the 2023 season, he recorded two receptions for 38 yards versus Tennessee. The following week against LSU, Law recorded two receptions for 25 yards in a win.

In 2023 Law recorded fifteen receptions for 135 yards and logged two tackles on special teams. That year, he also began to return kicks as a specialist. He kept this role in 2024 while also recording 105 yards on ten receptions.

On December 8, 2024, Law announced that he would enter the transfer portal to the Kentucky Wildcats. Upon transferring to Kentucky, he once again played as a returner on special teams, as well as finding an increase in usage on the field. Law returned 32 kickoffs for 720 yards for 24 yards per return, fourth in the Southeastern Conference (SEC). Of his 540 receiving yards, 505 came after the catch.

=== College statistics ===
College statistics
Year	Team	Receiving						Rushing			
Year	Team	GP	GS	Rec	Yds	Avg	TD	Att	Yds	Avg	TD
2022	Alabama	11	0	8	103	12.9	0	0	0	0.0	0
2023	Alabama	13	3	15	135	9.0	0	0	0	0.0	0
2024	Alabama	10	5	10	105	10.5	1	8	30	3.0	0
2025	Kentucky	12	12	53	540	10.2	3	8	53	6.6	0
Career		46	20	86	883	10.3	4	16	83	5.1	0

== Professional career ==
Pre-draft measurables
Height	Weight	Arm length	Hand span	Wingspan	40-yard dash	10-yard split	20-yard split	Vertical jump	Broad jump	Bench press
5 ft 11 3/8 in (1.81 m)	203 lb (92 kg)	31 1/8 in (0.79 m)	9 5/8 in (0.24 m)	6 ft 4 in (1.93 m)	4.45 s	1.56 s	2.59 s	42.0 in (1.07 m)	10 ft 8 in (3.25 m)	21 reps
All values from NFL Combine

Law was selected by the Detroit Lions with the 168th overall pick in the fifth round of the 2026 NFL draft. On June 2, he suffered a torn ACL and was ruled out for his entire rookie season. On June 17, Law was officially placed on season-ending injured reserve.
