= Rickey Isom =

American football player (born 1963)

No. 20
- Position: Running back

Personal information
- Born: November 30, 1963 (age 62); Harrisburg, Pennsylvania, U.S.
- Listed height: 6 ft 0 in (1.83 m)
- Listed weight: 224 lb (102 kg)

Career information
- High school: Harrisburg
- College: NC State
- NFL draft: 1986: 12th round, 329th overall pick

Career history
- Miami Dolphins (1987)
- Stats at Pro Football Reference

Rickey Isom (born November 30, 1963) is an American former professional football player who was a running back for the Miami Dolphins of the National Football League (NFL) in 1987. He played college football for the NC State Wolfpack. He was a replacement player in the NFL during the 1987 players strike.
