= Addison West =

American football player (born 2000)

Profile
- Position: Center

Personal information
- Born: December 5, 2000 (age 25); Cary, Illinois, U.S.
- Listed height: 6 ft 3 in (1.91 m)
- Listed weight: 300 lb (136 kg)

Career information
- High school: Cary-Grove (IL)
- College: Western Michigan (2019–2024)
- NFL draft: 2025: undrafted

Career history
- Miami Dolphins (2025)*
- * Offseason or practice squad member only

Awards and highlights
- Consensus All-American (2024); First-team All-MAC (2024); Third-team All-MAC (2023)

Addison West (born December 5, 2000) is an American professional football center. He played college football for the Western Michigan Broncos.

== Early life ==
West was born on December 5, 2000, and grew up in Cary, Illinois. He attended Cary-Grove High School where he played football and basketball. An offensive lineman and defensive lineman in football, he became a starter as a sophomore and helped the team reach the playoffs in his last two years. He helped them win the 2018 6A state championship and was a two-time all-state, all-area and all-conference performer. West set a school record in 2018 for most pancake blocks, with 48. He committed to play college football for the Western Michigan Broncos.

== College career ==
West redshirted and appeared in one game for Western Michigan in 2019. He then saw no action in 2020, and appeared in seven games, mainly on special teams, in 2021. He became a full-time starter in 2022. He started all 12 games in 2022, all 12 games in 2023, and all 13 games in 2024. As a senior in 2024, he allowed no sacks and was ranked the best offensive guard in the nation by Pro Football Focus (PFF). He was named first-team Mid-American Conference (MAC) following the 2024 season. He was also named a first-team All-American, becoming the fourth All-American in school history and the first first-team selection, and later became a Consensus All-American.

== Professional career ==
Pre-draft measurables
Height	Weight	Arm length	Hand span	40-yard dash	10-yard split	20-yard split	20-yard shuttle	Three-cone drill	Vertical jump	Broad jump	Bench press
6 ft 2 5/8 in (1.90 m)	300 lb (136 kg)	31 1/2 in (0.80 m)	9 1/2 in (0.24 m)	5.17 s	1.78 s	2.96 s	4.74 s	7.58 s	33.0 in (0.84 m)	9 ft 7 in (2.92 m)	23 reps
All values from Pro Day

On May 9, 2025, West signed with the Miami Dolphins as an undrafted free agent after going unselected in the 2025 NFL draft. He was waived on August 26 as part of final roster cuts.

=== St. Louis Battlehawks ===
On January 14, 2026, West was selected by the St. Louis Battlehawks of the United Football League (UFL).
