= Darius Alexander =

American football player (born 2000)

No. 91 – New York Giants
- Position: Defensive tackle
- Roster status: Active

Personal information
- Born: August 26, 2000 (age 26)
- Listed height: 6 ft 4 in (1.93 m)
- Listed weight: 310 lb (141 kg)

Career information
- High school: Wayne (Fort Wayne, Indiana)
- College: Toledo (2019–2024)
- NFL draft: 2025: 3rd round, 65th overall pick

Career history
- New York Giants (2025–present)

Awards and highlights
- Second-team All-MAC (2024); Third-team All-MAC (2023)

Career NFL statistics as of 2025
- Total tackles: 29
- Sacks: 5
- Pass deflections: 2
- Stats at Pro Football Reference

Darius Jeavion Alexander (born August 26, 2000) is an American professional football defensive tackle for the New York Giants of the National Football League (NFL). He played college football for the Toledo Rockets and was selected by the Giants in the third round of the 2025 NFL draft.

== Early life ==
Alexander is from Fort Wayne, Indiana. He attended Wayne High School, where he played as a defensive lineman, totaling 87 tackles, 21 tackles-for-loss (TFLs) and 10 sacks as a senior and being the Summit Athletic Conference Player of the Year. He won three varsity letters and was a two-time all-state selection. Although ranked one of the top 30 recruits in the state, Alexander received little attention as a recruit, only receiving offers from two programs and committing to the Toledo Rockets.

== College career ==
Alexander redshirted as a freshman at Toledo in 2019. He played in six games, totaling nine tackles, in 2020, before playing in all 13 games in 2021 and posting 21 tackles. He appeared in 13 games in 2022 and tallied 21 tackles with 7.0 TFLs. He became a full-time starter in 2023 and recorded 36 tackles and four sacks, helping the Rockets compile a record of 11–3 with a division championship.

Alexander was named third-team All-Mid-American Conference (MAC) for the 2023 season and entering the 2024 season, was named to The Athletic's "Freaks" list, highlighting the most athletic college football players. As a senior in 2024, Alexander posted 40 tackles, 7.5 TFLs and 3.5 sacks, being named second-team All-MAC. He played a total of 58 games in his collegiate career and in his last game, against Pittsburgh, he returned an interception for a touchdown.

He was invited to the 2025 Senior Bowl.

== Professional career ==
Pre-draft measurables
Height	Weight	Arm length	Hand span	Wingspan	40-yard dash	10-yard split	20-yard split	20-yard shuttle	Three-cone drill	Vertical jump	Broad jump	Bench press
6 ft 3 7/8 in (1.93 m)	305 lb (138 kg)	34 in (0.86 m)	10 in (0.25 m)	6 ft 10 7/8 in (2.11 m)	4.95 s	1.72 s	2.91 s	4.79 s	7.60 s	31.5 in (0.80 m)	9 ft 3 in (2.82 m)	28 reps
All values from NFL Combine

Alexander was selected by the New York Giants with the 65th pick in the third round of the 2025 NFL draft.

== Career statistics ==
Legend
**Bold**	Career high

=== NFL ===
Year	Team	Games		Tackles						Fumbles	
Year	Team	GP	GS	Cmb	Solo	Ast	Sck	TfL	PD	FF	FR
2025	NYG	16	2	**20**	**9**	**11**	**3.5**	**4**	**1**	0	0
2026	NYG	8	1	10	4	6	1.5	1	**1**	0	0
Career		24	3	30	13	17	5	5	2	0	0
