= Brayden Swartout =

American gridiron football player (born 2003)

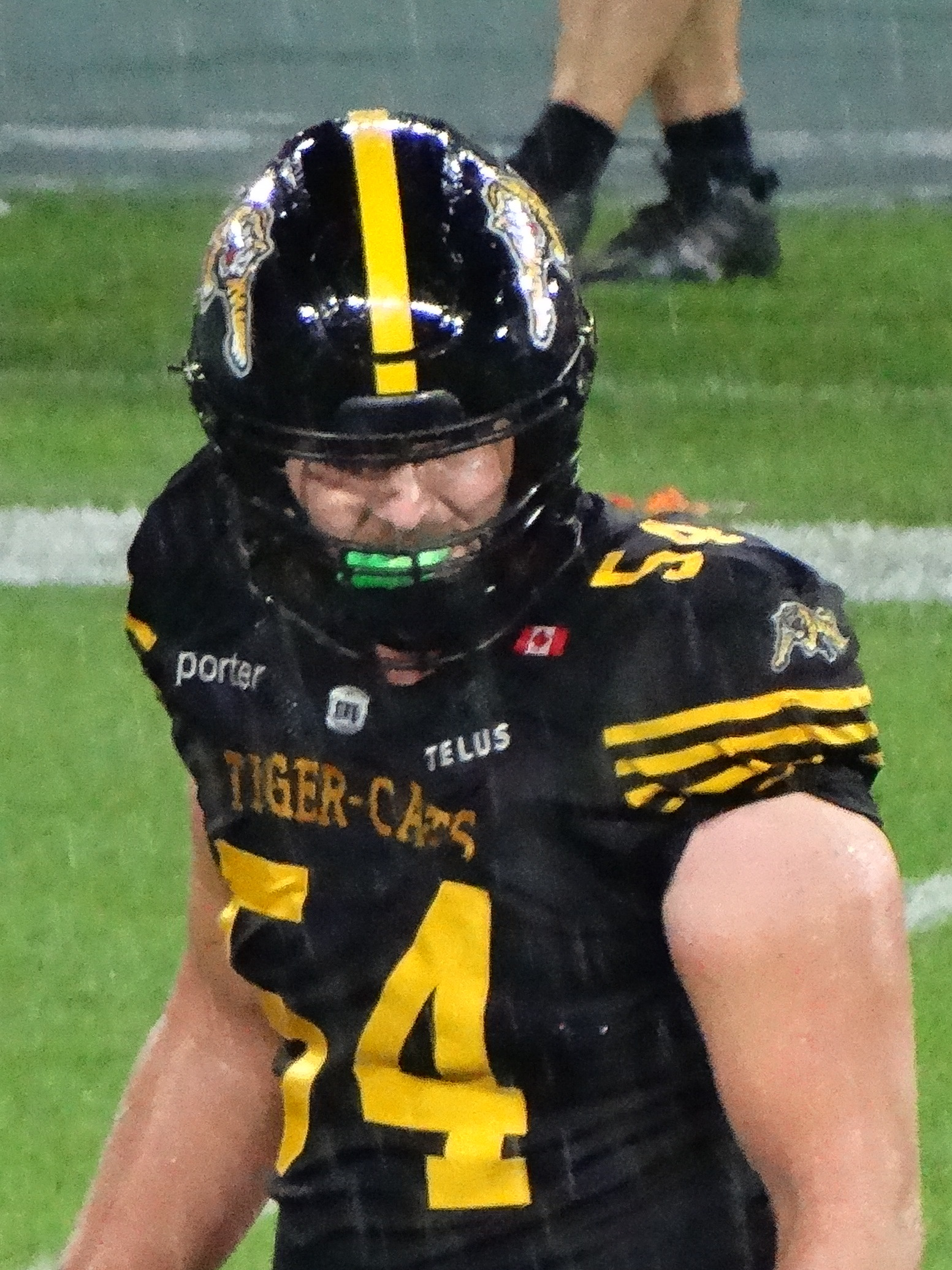
- Swartout with the Hamilton Tiger-Cats in 2026

No. 54 – Hamilton Tiger-Cats
- Position: Offensive lineman
- Roster status: Active
- CFL status: American

Personal information
- Born: August 14, 2003 (age 23)
- Listed height: 6 ft 7 in (2.01 m)
- Listed weight: 305 lb (138 kg)

Career information
- High school: Garber (Essexville, Michigan)
- College: Central Michigan (2021–2024)
- NFL draft: 2025: undrafted

Career history
- Hamilton Tiger-Cats (2025–present)

Awards and highlights
- 2× Second-team All-MAC (2023–2024)
- Stats at CFL.ca

Brayden Swartout (born August 14, 2003) is an American professional football offensive lineman for the Hamilton Tiger-Cats of the Canadian Football League (CFL). He played college football for the Central Michigan Chippewas.

== Early life ==
Swartout was born on August 14, 2003. He attended Garber High School in Essexville, Michigan.

== College career ==
Swartout played college football for the Central Michigan Chippewas from 2021 to 2024. He played in 41 games and started in 36. Swartout was a two-time, second-team All-MAC selection in 2023 and 2024. He was invited to the 2025 Hula Bowl.

== Professional career ==
Pre-draft measurables
Height	Weight	Arm length	Hand span	Wingspan	40-yard dash	10-yard split	20-yard split	20-yard shuttle	Three-cone drill	Vertical jump	Broad jump
6 ft 7 in (2.01 m)	303 lb (137 kg)	9 3/8 in (0.24 m)	32 5/8 in (0.83 m)	6 ft 7 3/4 in (2.03 m)	5.32 s	1.85 s	3.01 s	4.78 s	7.65 s	32 in (0.81 m)	8 ft 11 in (2.72 m)
All values from Pro day

On May 13, 2025, Swartout signed with the Hamilton Tiger-Cats of the Canadian Football League (CFL). On June 1, he was signed to the practice roster where he stayed for the rest of the 2025 season. On June 3, 2026, Swartout was moved to the reserve roster. On July 17, he was elevated to the practice squad. On July 22, Swartout was signed to the active roster. On July 25, he was announced as the starter at right tackle in place of the injured, Quinton Barrow.
