= Donte Kent =

American football player (born 2001)

No. 34 – Pittsburgh Steelers
- Position: Cornerback
- Roster status: Physically unable to perform

Personal information
- Born: September 28, 2001 (age 25); Harrisburg, Pennsylvania, U.S.
- Listed height: 5 ft 10 in (1.78 m)
- Listed weight: 189 lb (86 kg)

Career information
- High school: Harrisburg
- College: Central Michigan (2020–2024)
- NFL draft: 2025: 7th round, 229th overall pick

Career history
- Pittsburgh Steelers (2025–present)

Awards and highlights
- First-team All-MAC (2022); 2× Second-team All-MAC (2023, 2024)
- Stats at Pro Football Reference

Donte Kent (born September 28, 2001) is an American professional football cornerback for the Pittsburgh Steelers of the National Football League (NFL). He played college football for the Central Michigan Chippewas and was selected by the Steelers in the seventh round of the 2025 NFL draft.

== Early life ==
Kent attended Harrisburg High School in Harrisburg, Pennsylvania, and committed to play college football for the Central Michigan Chippewas.

== College career ==
During his collegiate career at Central Michigan from 2020 through 2024, Kent appeared in 53 games, where he recorded 234 tackles with six being for a loss, a sack and a half, 46 pass deflections, two interceptions, two forced fumbles, and a fumble recovery.

== Professional career ==
Pre-draft measurables
Height	Weight	Arm length	Hand span	Wingspan	40-yard dash	10-yard split	20-yard split	20-yard shuttle	Three-cone drill	Vertical jump	Broad jump	Bench press
5 ft 10 1/4 in (1.78 m)	187 lb (85 kg)	31 in (0.79 m)	8 1/2 in (0.22 m)	6 ft 1 1/2 in (1.87 m)	4.38 s	1.53 s	2.56 s	4.38 s	7.15 s	38.5 in (0.98 m)	10 ft 3 in (3.12 m)	14 reps
All values from Pro Day

Kent was selected by the Pittsburgh Steelers with the 229th overall pick of the seventh round in the 2025 NFL draft. He was placed on injured reserve on August 28, 2025, due to a right foot injury. After returning to practice in anticipation of his NFL debut, Kent suffered an ankle injury; he was subsequently ruled out for the remainder of the season on December 5.

Kent began the 2026 season on the PUP list while recovering from an ACL injury.

== Personal life ==
His brother, Ronald Kent Jr. played college football with Western Carolina and Central Michigan.
