= 2024 Mid-American Conference football season =

- League: NCAA Division I Football Bowl Subdivision
- Sport: Football
- Duration: August 29 - December 7
- Teams: 12

2025 NFL draft
- Top draft pick: Darius Alexander, DT, Toledo
- Picked by: New York Giants, 65th overall

Regular season
- Season champions: Ohio, Miami (OH)
- Season MVP: Harold Fannin Jr.

MAC Championship Game
- Champions: Ohio
- Runners-up: Miami (OH)

Seasons
- 2023 2025

2024 Mid-American Conference football standings
	Conf.			Overall
Team	W		L	W		L
Ohio y$	7	–	1	11	–	3
Miami (OH) y	7	–	1	9	–	5
Buffalo	6	–	2	9	–	4
Bowling Green	6	–	2	7	–	6
Western Michigan	5	–	3	6	–	7
Toledo	4	–	4	8	–	5
Northern Illinois	4	–	4	8	–	5
Akron	3	–	5	4	–	8
Eastern Michigan	2	–	6	5	–	7
Central Michigan	2	–	6	4	–	8
Ball State	2	–	6	3	–	9
Kent State	0	–	8	0	–	12
Championship: Ohio 38, Miami (OH) 3
$ – Conference champion; y – Championship game participant

The 2024 Mid-American Conference football season was the 79th season for the Mid-American Conference (MAC), as part of the 2024 NCAA Division I FBS football season. Non-conference play began on August 29. Conference play began on September 21 and concluded with the MAC championship game on December 7 at Ford Field in Detroit, Michigan. For the first time since 1996, the MAC did not have divisions. The Championship game featured the two teams with the best conference records. This was the conference's last season with 12 members as in 2025. it will see its first change in membership since 2015 with the addition of UMass.

Miami and Ohio finished the season with 7-1 conference records and the Battle of the Bricks rivalry happened twice in the same season for the first time with a rematch in the Championship Game. Bowling Green's tight-end Harold Fannin Jr. was the Offensive Player of the Year and won the Vern Smith Leadership Award. Linebacker Shaun Dolac of Buffalo was Defensive Player of the Year. Tim Albin of Ohio won Coach of the Year.

Ohio avenged the regular season loss to Miami, winning 38–3, and won the MAC Championship for the first time since 1968. Parker Navarro won Offensive Player of the Game with 235 passing yards with 2 touchdowns and 73 rushing yards and 2 touchdowns. Bradley Weaver was Defensive Player of the Game. Gianni Spetic hit a 51-yard field goal and won Special Teams Player of the Game.

Seven MAC teams qualified for bowls with a record of five wins and two losses.

== Preseason ==
The MAC Football Kickoff was held on Friday, July 19, 2024 at the Pro Football Hall of Fame in Canton, Ohio from 9:00 am EDT to 1:30 pm EDT. Commissioner Jon Steinbrecher spoke. Each team had their head coach and a student athlete from both the offense and the defense available to speak to the media.

- Akron – Head Coach Joe Moorhead, Bryan McCoy, Jr., LB, Bennett Adler, Sr., DL
- Ball State – Head Coach Mike Neu, Tanner Koziol, Jr., TE, Keionte Newson, Sr., LB
- Bowling Green – Head Coach Scot Loeffler, Connor Bazelak, Sr., QB, Jordan Oladokun, Sr., CB
- Buffalo – Head Coach Pete Lembo, Shaun Dolac, Grad., LB, Red Murdock, R-So., LB
- Central Michigan – Head Coach Jim McElwain, Donte Kent, Sr., DB, Brayden Swartout, Sr., OL
- Eastern Michigan – Head Coach Chris Creighton, Justin Jefferson, Sr., DL, Jere Getzinger, Sr., TE
- Kent State – Head Coach Kenni Burns, Chrishon McCray, R-So., WR, Oliver Billotte, Jr., DE
- Miami – Head Coach Chuck Martin, Brett Gabbert, 6th-Sr., QB, Matt Salopek, 6th-Sr., LB
- Northern Illinois – Head Coach Thomas Hammock, J.J. Lippe, R-Sr., OL, Jashon Prophete, Sr., S
- Ohio – Head Coach Tim Albin, Parker Navarro, Grad., QB, Jeremiah Wood, Grad., S
- Toledo – Head Coach Jason Candle, Jerjuan Newton, Sr., WR, Maxen Hook, Sr., S
- Western Michigan – Head Coach Lance Taylor, Hayden Wolff, R-Sr., QB, Damari Roberson, R-Sr., LB

=== Preseason polls ===
==== Coaches Poll ====
On July 19, the MAC announced the preseason coaches poll. Defending MAC champion Miami was named the preseason favorite to win the conference while defending West division champion Toledo was picked to finish second.

MAC Coaches poll
Predicted finish	Team	Votes (1st place)
1	Miami	119 (9)
2	Toledo	109 (3)
T3	Bowling Green	92
T3	Northern Illinois	92
5	Ohio	81
6	Eastern Michigan	64
7	Western Michigan	60
8	Central Michigan	59
9	Ball State	42
10	Buffalo	37
11	Akron	24
12	Kent State	13

Coaches poll (MAC Championship)
Rank	Team	Votes
1	Miami	10
2	Toledo	2

=== Individual Award Preseason Watchlists ===
Award	Head Coach/Player	School	Position	Year	Ref
Lott Trophy	none				
Dodd Trophy	none		HC	—	
Maxwell Award	Terion Stewart	Bowling Green	RB	Jr.	
Maxwell Award	Antario Brown	Northern Illinois	RB	Sr.	
Patrick Mannelly Award	none		LS		
Outland Trophy	Jacob Gideon	Western Michigan	OL	Sr.	
Outland Trophy	Reid Holskey	Miami	OL	R-Sr.	
Outland Trophy	Alex Wollschlaeger	Bowling Green	OL	Sr.	
Bronko Nagurski Trophy	Maxen Hook	Toledo	S	Sr.	
Bronko Nagurski Trophy	CJ Nunnally IV	Akron	DL	Sr.	
Bronko Nagurski Trophy	Matt Salopek	Miami	LB	6th	
Jim Thorpe Award	Maxen Hook	Toledo	DB	Sr.	
Jim Thorpe Award	Donte Kent	Central Michigan	DB	Sr.	
Jim Thorpe Award	Jordan Oladokun	Bowling Green	DB	Sr.	
Paul Hornung Award	Marion Lukes	Central Michigan	RB	Sr.	
Paul Hornung Award	Trayvon Rudolph	Northern Illinois	WR	R-Sr.	
Paul Hornung Award	Jacquez Stuart	Toledo	RB	Sr.	
Wuerffel Trophy	Jordan Oladokun	Bowling Green	CB	Sr.	
Wuerffel Trophy	Taji Johnson	Buffalo	WR	GS	
Wuerffel Trophy	Dominic Serapiglia	Central Michigan	OL	R-Sr.	
Wuerffel Trophy	David Carter Jr.	Eastern Michigan	DB	Sr.	
Wuerffel Trophy	Cameron Golden	Kent State	OL	GS	
Wuerffel Trophy	Cade Haberman	Northern Illinois	DT	Sr.	
Wuerffel Trophy	Michael Denning	Toledo	PK	Sr.	
Wuerffel Trophy	Boone Bonnema	Western Michigan	LB	R-Sr.	
Lou Groza Award	none		PK		
Ray Guy Award	Alec Bevelhimer	Miami	P	Sr.	
Ray Guy Award	Mitchell Tomasek	Eastern Michigan	P	Sr.	
Walter Camp Award	Terion Stewart	Bowling Green	RB	Jr.	
Walter Camp Award	Marion Lukes	Central Michigan	RB	Sr.	
Walter Camp Award	Antario Brown	Northern Illinois	RB	Sr.	
Walter Camp Award	Jalen Buckley	Western Michigan	RB	R-So.	

Award	Head Coach/Player	School	Position	Year	Ref
Doak Walker Award	Terion Stewart	Bowling Green	RB	Jr.	
Doak Walker Award	Marion Lukes	Central Michigan	RB	Sr.	
Doak Walker Award	Antario Brown	Northern Illinois	RB	Sr.	
Doak Walker Award	Jalen Buckley	Western Michigan	RB	R-So.	
Comeback Player of the Year	Demetrius Hardamon	Bowling Green	LB	Sr.	
Comeback Player of the Year	Jake Orlando	Buffalo	TE	GS	
Comeback Player of the Year	Brett Gabbert	Miami	QB	6th	
Comeback Player of the Year	Jack Coldiron	Miami	TE	R-Sr.	
Biletnikoff Award	none		WR		
Davey O'Brien Award	Brett Gabbert	Miami	QB	6th	
John Mackey Award	Harold Fannin Jr.	Bowling Green	TE	Jr.	
John Mackey Award	Anthony Torres	Toledo	TE	Sr.	
Rimington Trophy	Jacob Gideon	Western Michigan	OL	Sr.	
Bednarik Award	CJ Nunnally IV	Akron	DE	Sr.	
Bednarik Award	Jordan Oladokun	Bowling Green	CB	Sr.	
Bednarik Award	Matt Salopek	Miami	LB	6th	
Bednarik Award	Maxen Hook	Toledo	S	Sr.	
Butkus Award	Matt Salopek	Miami	LB	6th	
Johnny Unitas Golden Arm Award	Brett Gabbert	Miami	QB	6th	
Johnny Unitas Golden Arm Award	Hayden Wolff	Western Michigan	QB	R-Sr.	
Manning Award	none		QB		
Polynesian College Football Player Of The Year Award	none				
Rotary Lombardi Award	CJ Nunnally IV	Akron	DL	Sr.	
Rotary Lombardi Award	Alex Wollschlaeger	Bowling Green	OT	Sr.	
Rotary Lombardi Award	Reid Holskey	Miami	OT	R-Sr.	
Rotary Lombardi Award	Matt Salopek	Miami	LB	6th	
Rotary Lombardi Award	Jacob Gideon	Western Michigan	C	Sr.	
Earl Campbell Tyler Rose Award	Bert Emanual Jr.	Central Michigan	QB	So.	

== Coaches ==
=== Coaching changes ===
The MAC enters the 2024 season with one coaching change from 2023.

- Buffalo head coach Maurice Linguist resigned on January 16, 2024, after his team finished the 2023 season with a 3–9 record, to join Kalen DeBoer’s staff at Alabama. On January 21, 2024 Pete Lembo, who was the associate head coach and special teams coordinator at South Carolina and was previously a MAC head coach at Ball State, was hired as the new head coach.

=== Head coaching records ===
Team	Head coach	Previous Job	Years at school	Record at school	MAC record	MAC titles
Akron	Joe Moorhead	Oregon (offensive coordinator)	3	4–20 (.167)	2–14 (.125)	0
Ball State	Mike Neu	New Orleans Saints (QB Coach)	9	37–56 (.398)	23–39 (.371)	1
Bowling Green	Scot Loeffler	Boston College (offensive coordinator/QB coach)	6	20–35 (.364)	14–23 (.378)	0
Buffalo	Pete Lembo	South Carolina (associate head coach/special teams coordinator)	1	0–0 (–)	0–0 (–)	0
Central Michigan	Jim McElwain	Florida	6	29–28 (.509)	21–17 (.553)	0
Eastern Michigan	Chris Creighton	Drake	11	52–68 (.433)	31–47 (.397)	0
Kent State	Kenni Burns	Minnesota (associate head coach/running backs)	2	1–11 (.083)	0–8 (.000)	0
Miami	Chuck Martin	Notre Dame (offensive coordinator/QB coach)	10	56–62 (.475)	44–31 (.587)	2
Northern Illinois	Thomas Hammock	Baltimore Ravens (running backs coach)	6	24–33 (.421)	17–21 (.447)	1
Ohio	Tim Albin	Ohio (associate head coach/offensive coordinator)	4	23–16 (.590)	16–8 (.667)	0
Toledo	Jason Candle	Toledo (offensive coordinator)	9	65–35 (.650)	43–19 (.694)	2
Western Michigan	Lance Taylor	Louisville (offensive coordinator)	2	4–8 (.333)	3–5 (.375)	0

Source -

=== Mid-season changes ===
- On November 16, Ball State announced that they had fired head coach Mike Neu. Neu had gone 40–63 with the school during his tenure. Offensive line coach Colin Johnson was named the interim head coach. On December 4, Ball State announced that Mike Uremovich would become the new head coach. Uremovich had previously been head coach at Butler.
- On December 7, Ohio head coach Tim Albin was announced as the new head coach of Charlotte in the American Athletic Conference. Offensive coordinator Brian Smith was named the interim head coach for Ohio's bowl game.

=== Post-season changes ===
- On November 20, 2024, Central Michigan head coach Jim McElwain announced that he would retire at the end of the season. On December 9, Central Michigan announced Matt Drinkall as the new head coach for the 2025 season. Drinkall had previously been the offensive line coach at Army.

== Rankings ==
		Pre	Wk 1	Wk 2	Wk 3	Wk 4	Wk 5	Wk 6	Wk 7	Wk 8	Wk 9	Wk 10	Wk 11	Wk 12	Wk 13	Wk 14	Wk 15	Final
Akron	AP																	
Akron	C																	
Akron	CFP	Not released																
Ball State	AP																	
Ball State	C																	
Ball State	CFP	Not released																
Bowling Green	AP																	
Bowling Green	C																	
Bowling Green	CFP	Not released																
Buffalo	AP																	
Buffalo	C																	
Buffalo	CFP	Not released																
Central Michigan	AP																	
Central Michigan	C																	
Central Michigan	CFP	Not released																
Eastern Michigan	AP																	
Eastern Michigan	C																	
Eastern Michigan	CFP	Not released																
Kent State	AP																	
Kent State	C																	
Kent State	CFP	Not released																
Miami	AP																	
Miami	C	RV													RV	RV		
Miami	CFP	Not released																
Northern Illinois	AP			25	23													
Northern Illinois	C			RV	RV													
Northern Illinois	CFP	Not released																
Ohio	AP																RV	RV
Ohio	C																RV	RV
Ohio	CFP	Not released																
Toledo	AP				RV													
Toledo	C				RV													
Toledo	CFP	Not released																
Western Michigan	AP																	
Western Michigan	C																	
Western Michigan	CFP	Not released																

Legend
	Improvement in ranking
	Drop in ranking
	Not ranked previous week
	No change in ranking from previous week
RV	Received votes but were not ranked in Top 25 of poll
т	Tied with team above or below also with this symbol

AP -

Coaches -

CFP -

== Schedule ==
Index to colors and formatting
MAC member won
MAC member lost
MAC teams in **bold**

All times Eastern time.

=== Week 1 ===
Date	Time	Visiting team	Home team	Site	TV	Result	Attendance	Ref.
August 29	7:00 p.m.	Fordham	**Bowling Green**	Doyt Perry Stadium • Bowling Green, OH	ESPN+	**W** 41–17	12,786	
August 29	7:00 p.m.	No. 17 (FCS) Lafayette	**Buffalo**	UB Stadium • Buffalo, NY	ESPN+	**W** 30–13	16,400	
August 29	7:00 p.m.	Central Connecticut	**Central Michigan**	Kelly/Shorts Stadium • Mount Pleasant, MI	ESPN+	**W** 66–10	18,055	
August 29	7:30 p.m.	Duquesne	**Toledo**	Glass Bowl • Toledo, OH	ESPN+	**W** 49–10	23,515	
August 30	9:00 p.m.	**Western Michigan**	Wisconsin	Camp Randall Stadium • Madison, WI	FS1	**L** 14–28	75,158	
August 31	12:00 p.m.	**Kent State**	Pittsburgh	Acrisure Stadium • Pittsburgh, PA	ESPNU	**L** 24–55	44,616	
August 31	3:30 p.m.	**Eastern Michigan**	UMass	McGuirk Alumni Stadium • Hadley, MA	ESPN+	**W** 28–14	12,810	
August 31	3:30 p.m.	Western Illinois	**Northern Illinois**	Huskie Stadium • DeKalb, IL	ESPN+	**W** 54–15	10,828	
August 31	3:30 p.m.	**Ohio**	Syracuse	JMA Wireless Dome • Syracuse, NY	ACCN	**L** 22–38	37,225	
August 31	3:30 p.m.	**Akron**	No. 2 Ohio State	Ohio Stadium • Columbus, OH	CBS	**L** 6–52	102,011	
August 31	3:30 p.m.	**Miami (OH)**	Northwestern	Martin Stadium • Evanston, IL	BTN	**L** 6–13	12,023	
^{#}Rankings from AP Poll released prior to game. All times are in Eastern Time.

=== Week 2 ===
Date	Time	Visiting team	Home team	Site	TV	Result	Attendance	Ref.
September 7	12:00 p.m.	**Akron**	Rutgers	SHI Stadium • Piscataway, NJ	BTN	**L** 17–49	41,021	
September 7	12:00 p.m.	**Bowling Green**	No. 8 Penn State	Beaver Stadium • University Park, PA	BTN	**L** 27–34	103,861	
September 7	2:00 p.m.	Missouri State	**Ball State**	Scheumann Stadium • Muncie, IN	ESPN+	**W** 42–34	10,018	
September 7	2:30 p.m.	Saint Francis (PA)	**Kent State**	Dix Stadium • Kent, OH	ESPN+	**L** 17–23	11,585	
September 7	3:30 p.m.	UMass	**Toledo**	Glass Bowl • Toledo, OH	ESPN+	**W** 38–23	21,668	
September 7	3:30 p.m.	**Eastern Michigan**	Washington	Husky Stadium • Seattle, WA	BTN	**L** 9–30	64,222	
September 7	3:30 p.m.	**Northern Illinois**	No. 5 Notre Dame	Notre Dame Stadium • South Bend, IN	NBC	**W** 16–14	77,622	
September 7	6:00 p.m.	**Central Michigan**	FIU	Riccardo Silva Stadium • Miami, FL	ESPN+	**L** 16–52	17,852	
September 7	6:00 p.m.	South Alabama	**Ohio**	Peden Stadium • Athens, OH	ESPN+	**W** 27–20	22,158	
September 7	7:00 p.m.	**Buffalo**	No. 9 Missouri	Faurot Field • Columbia, MO	ESPN+/SECN+	**L** 0–38	62,621	
September 7	7:30 p.m.	**Western Michigan**	No. 2 Ohio State	Ohio Stadium • Columbus, OH	BTN	**L** 0–56	102,665	
^{#}Rankings from AP Poll released prior to game. All times are in Eastern Time.

=== Week 3 ===
Date	Time	Visiting team	Home team	Site	TV	Result	Attendance	Ref.
September 14	12:00 p.m.	Cincinnati	**Miami (OH)**	Yager Stadium • Oxford, OH (Victory Bell)	ESPNU	**L** 16–27	24,717	
September 14	12:00 p.m.	**Central Michigan**	Illinois	Memorial Stadium • Champaign, IL	Peacock	**L** 9–30	51,498	
September 14	1:00 p.m.	UMass	**Buffalo**	UB Stadium • Buffalo, NY	CBSSN	**W** 34–3	15,204	
September 14	3:30 p.m.	Morgan State	**Ohio**	Peden Stadium • Athens, OH	ESPN+	**W** 21–6	20,438	
September 14	5:55 p.m. (Note: Delayed from 3:30 p.m. due to weather)	**Ball State**	No. 10 Miami (FL)	Hard Rock Stadium • Miami Gardens, FL	ACCN	**L** 0–62	51,564	
September 14	6:00 p.m.	Colgate	**Akron**	InfoCision Stadium • Akron, OH	ESPN+	**W** 31–20	8,932	
September 14	6:30 p.m.	Bethune-Cookman	**Western Michigan**	Waldo Stadium • Kalamazoo, MI	ESPN+	**W** 59–31	23,476	
September 14	7:00 p.m.	Jacksonville State	**Eastern Michigan**	Rynearson Stadium • Ypsilanti, MI	ESPN+	**W** 37–34 ^{2OT}	17,501	
September 14	7:30 p.m.	**Toledo**	Mississippi State	Davis Wade Stadium • Starkville, MS	ESPNU	**W** 41–17	47,412	
September 14	7:45 p.m.	**Kent State**	No. 7 Tennessee	Neyland Stadium • Knoxville, TN	SECN	**L** 0–71	101,915	
^{#}Rankings from AP Poll released prior to game. All times are in Eastern Time.

=== Week 4 ===
Date	Time	Visiting team	Home team	Site	TV	Result	Attendance	Ref.
September 21	12:45 p.m.	**Ohio**	Kentucky	Kroger Field • Lexington, KY	SECN	**L** 6–41	61,783	
September 21	1:00 p.m.	**Ball State**	**Central Michigan**	Kelly/Shorts Stadium • Mount Pleasant, MI	ESPN+	**CMU** 37–34	18,011	
September 21	2:00 p.m.	Saint Francis (PA)	**Eastern Michigan**	Rynearson Stadium • Ypsilanti, MI	ESPN+	**W** 36–0	15,509	
September 21	3:30 p.m.	**Buffalo**	No. 23 **Northern Illinois**	Huskie Stadium • DeKalb, IL	ESPN+	**UB** 23–20 ^{OT}	18,688	
September 21	3:30 p.m.	**Kent State**	No. 10 Penn State	Beaver Stadium • University Park, Pennsylvania	BTN	**L** 0–56	109,526	
September 21	3:30 p.m.	**Miami (OH)**	No. 17 Notre Dame	Notre Dame Stadium • South Bend, IN	NBC	**L** 3–28	77,622	
September 21	7:00 p.m.	**Toledo**	Western Kentucky	Houchens Industries–L. T. Smith Stadium • Bowling Green, KY	ESPN+	**L** 21–26	19,127	
September 21	7:30 p.m.	**Akron**	South Carolina	Williams–Brice Stadium • Columbia, SC	ESPNU	**L** 7–50	78,704	
September 21	7:30 p.m	**Bowling Green**	No. 25 Texas A&M	Kyle Field • College Station, TX	ESPN+	**L** 20–26	99,523	
^{#}Rankings from AP Poll released prior to game. All times are in Eastern Time.

=== Week 5 ===
Date	Time	Visiting team	Home team	Site	TV	Result	Attendance	Ref.
September 28	12:00 p.m.	**Northern Illinois**	NC State	Carter–Finley Stadium • Raleigh, NC	The CW	**L** 17–24	56,919	
September 28	12:00 p.m.	**Buffalo**	UConn	Rentschler Field • East Hartford, CT	CBSSN	**L** 3–47	20,347	
September 28	2:30 p.m.	**Ball State**	James Madison	Bridgeforth Stadium • Harrisonburg, VA	ESPN+	**L** 7–63	25,786	
September 28	3:30 p.m.	San Diego State	**Central Michigan**	Kelly/Shorts Stadium • Mount Pleasant, MI	CBSSN	**W** 22–21	27,072	
September 28	3:30 p.m.	UMass	**Miami (OH)**	Yager Stadium • Oxford, OH	ESPN+	**W** 23–20 ^{OT}	9,542	
September 28	3:30 p.m.	**Eastern Michigan**	**Kent State**	Dix Stadium • Kent, OH	ESPN+	**EMU** 52–33	10,899	
September 28	3:30 p.m.	**Akron**	**Ohio**	Peden Stadium • Athens, OH	ESPN+	**OHIO** 30–10	21,265	
September 28	3:30 p.m.	**Western Michigan**	Marshall	Joan C. Edwards Stadium • Huntington, WV	ESPN+	**L** 20–27	18,723	
September 28	5:00 p.m.	Old Dominion	**Bowling Green**	Doyt Perry Stadium • Bowling Green, OH	ESPN+	**L** 27–30	19,140	
^{#}Rankings from AP Poll released prior to game. All times are in Eastern Time.

=== Week 6 ===
Date	Time	Visiting team	Home team	Site	TV	Result	Attendance	Ref.
October 5	12:00 p.m.	UMass	**Northern Illinois**	Huskie Stadium • DeKalb, IL	CBSSN	**W** 34–20	12,466	
October 5	2:00 p.m.	**Western Michigan**	**Ball State**	Scheumann Stadium • Muncie, IN	ESPN+	**WMU** 45–42	10,342	
October 5	3:30 p.m.	**Bowling Green**	**Akron**	InfoCision Stadium • Akron, OH	ESPN+	**BGSU** 27–20	9,337	
October 5	3:30 p.m.	**Miami (OH)**	**Toledo**	Glass Bowl • Toledo, OH	ESPN+	**TOL** 30–20	25,027	
^{#}Rankings from AP Poll released prior to game. All times are in Eastern Time.

=== Week 7 ===
Date	Time	Visiting team	Home team	Site	TV	Result	Attendance	Ref.
October 12	12:00 p.m.	Toledo	Buffalo	UB Stadium • Buffalo, NY	ESPNU	**UB** 30–15	13,996	
October 12	12:00 p.m.	Ball State	Kent State	Dix Stadium • Kent, OH	ESPN+	**BSU** 37–35	7,322	
October 12	2:00 p.m.	Miami (OH)	Eastern Michigan	Rynearson Stadium • Ypsilanti, MI	ESPN+	**M-OH** 38–14	16,903	
October 12	3:30 p.m.	Akron	Western Michigan	Waldo Stadium • Kalamazoo, MI	ESPN+	**WMU** 34–24	19,507	
October 12	3:30 p.m.	Northern Illinois	Bowling Green	Doyt Perry Stadium • Bowling Green, OH	ESPN+	**NIU** 17–7	9,559	
October 12	4:00 p.m.	Ohio	Central Michigan	Kelly/Shorts Stadium • Mount Pleasant, MI	ESPNU	**OHIO** 27–25	22,437	
^{#}Rankings from AP Poll released prior to game. All times are in Eastern Time.

=== Week 8 ===
Date	Time	Visiting team	Home team	Site	TV	Result	Attendance	Ref.
October 19	2:00 p.m.	Central Michigan	**Eastern Michigan**	Rynearson Stadium • Ypsilanti, MI (Michigan MAC Trophy)	ESPN+	**EMU** 38–34	17,974	
October 19	3:30 p.m.	Ohio	**Miami (OH)**	Yager Stadium • Oxford, OH (Battle of the Bricks)	ESPN+	**M-OH** 30–20	17,021	
October 19	3:30 p.m.	Kent State	**Bowling Green**	Doyt Perry Stadium • Bowling Green, OH (Anniversary Award)	ESPN+	**BGSU** 27–6	20,858	
October 19	3:30 p.m.	Western Michigan	**Buffalo**	UB Stadium • Buffalo, NY	ESPN+	**WMU** 48–41	18,487	
October 19	3:30 p.m.	Toledo	**Northern Illinois**	Huskie Stadium • DeKalb, IL	ESPN+	**TOL** 13–6	18,350	
October 19	7:00 p.m.	Ball State	Vanderbilt	FirstBank Stadium • Nashville, TN	ESPN+/SECN+	**L** 14–24	27,884	
^{#}Rankings from AP Poll released prior to game. All times are in Eastern Time.

=== Week 9 ===
Date	Time	Visiting team	Home team	Site	TV	Result	Attendance	Ref.
October 26	12:00 p.m.	Buffalo	Ohio	Peden Stadium • Athens, OH	CBSSN	**OHIO** 47–16	16,048	
October 26	2:00 p.m.	Central Michigan	Miami (OH)	Yager Stadium • Oxford, OH	ESPN+	**M-OH** 46–7	10,661	
October 26	3:30 p.m.	Eastern Michigan	Akron	InfoCision Stadium • Akron, OH	ESPN+	**AKR** 25–21	4,277	
October 26	3:30 p.m.	Northern Illinois	Ball State	Scheumann Stadium • Muncie, IN (Bronze Stalk Trophy)	ESPN+	**BSU** 25–23	15,318	
October 26	3:30 p.m.	Bowling Green	Toledo	Glass Bowl • Toledo, OH (Battle of I-75)	ESPN+	**BGSU** 41–26	29,697	
October 26	3:30 p.m.	Kent State	Western Michigan	Waldo Stadium • Kalamazoo, MI	ESPN+	**WMU** 52–21	23,537	
^{#}Rankings from AP Poll released prior to game. All times are in Eastern Time.

=== Week 10 ===
Date	Time	Visiting team	Home team	Site	TV	Result	Attendance	Ref.
November 2	12:00 p.m.	**Buffalo**	**Akron**	InfoCision Stadium • Akron, OH	CBSSN	**UB** 41–30	4,610	
November 2	12:00 p.m.	**Toledo**	**Eastern Michigan**	Rynearson Stadium • Ypsilanti, MI	ESPNU	**TOL** 29–28	13,044	
^{#}Rankings from AP Poll released prior to game. All times are in Eastern Time.

=== Week 11 ===
Date	Time	Visiting team	Home team	Site	TV	Result	Attendance	Ref.
November 5	7:30 p.m.	**Bowling Green**	**Central Michigan**	Kelly/Shorts Stadium • Mount Pleasant, MI	ESPN2	**BGSU** 23–13	7,832	
November 5	8:00 p.m.	**Miami (OH)**	**Ball State**	Scheumann Stadium • Muncie, IN	ESPN	**M-OH** 27–21	6,412	
November 6	7:00 p.m.	**Northern Illinois**	**Western Michigan**	Waldo Stadium • Kalamazoo, MI	ESPN2	**NIU** 42–28	10,346	
November 6	7:00 p.m.	**Ohio**	**Kent State**	Dix Stadium • Kent, OH	ESPNU	**OHIO** 41–0	5,662	
^{#}Rankings from AP Poll released prior to game. All times are in Eastern Time.

=== Week 12 ===
Date	Time	Visiting team	Home team	Site	TV	Result	Attendance	Ref.
November 12	7:00 p.m.	Ball State	Buffalo	UB Stadium • Buffalo, NY	CBSSN	**UB** 51–48 ^{OT}	12,708	
November 12	7:00 p.m.	Central Michigan	Toledo	Glass Bowl • Toledo, OH	ESPNU	**TOL** 37–10	14,661	
November 12	7:00 p.m.	Western Michigan	Bowling Green	Doyt Perry Stadium • Bowling Green, OH	ESPN2	**BGSU** 31–13	1,156	
November 13	7:00 p.m.	Akron	Northern Illinois	Huskie Stadium • DeKalb, IL	CBSSN	**NIU** 29–16	6,795	
November 13	7:00 p.m.	Eastern Michigan	Ohio	Peden Stadium • Athens, OH	ESPN2	**OHIO** 35–10	14,133	
November 13	7:00 p.m.	Kent State	Miami (OH)	Yager Stadium • Oxford, OH	ESPNU	**M-OH** 34–7	5,328	
^{#}Rankings from AP Poll released prior to game. All times are in Eastern Time.

=== Week 13 ===
Date	Time	Visiting team	Home team	Site	TV	Result	Attendance	Ref.
November 19	7:00 p.m.	Akron	Kent State	Dix Stadium • Kent, OH (Wagon Wheel)	CBSSN	**AKR** 38–17	6,768	
November 19	7:30 p.m.	Western Michigan	Central Michigan	Kelly/Shorts Stadium • Mount Pleasant, MI (Michigan MAC Trophy)	ESPN2	**CMU** 16–14	13,102	
November 19	8:00 p.m.	Northern Illinois	Miami (OH)	Yager Stadium • Oxford, OH	ESPN	**M-OH** 20–9	5,891	
November 20	7:00 p.m.	Buffalo	Eastern Michigan	Rynearson Stadium • Ypsilanti, MI	ESPNU	**UB** 37–20	12,004	
November 20	7:00 p.m.	Ohio	Toledo	Glass Bowl • Toledo, OH	ESPN2	**OHIO** 24–7	14,543	
November 23	2:00 p.m.	Bowling Green	Ball State	Scheumann Stadium • Muncie, IN	ESPN+	**BGSU** 38–13	7,116	
^{#}Rankings from AP Poll released prior to game. All times are in Eastern Time.

=== Week 14 ===
Date	Time	Visiting team	Home team	Site	TV	Result	Attendance	Ref.
November 26	7:00 p.m.	Kent State	Buffalo	UB Stadium • Buffalo, NY	ESPN+	**UB** 43–7	11,916	
November 26	7:00 p.m.	Toledo	Akron	InfoCision Stadium • Akron, OH	ESPN2	**AKR** 21–14 ^{OT}	4,716	
November 29	12:00 p.m.	Ball State	Ohio	Peden Stadium • Athens, OH	CBSSN	**OHIO** 42–21	11,804	
November 29	12:00 p.m.	Miami (OH)	Bowling Green	Doyt Perry Stadium • Bowling Green, OH	ESPNU	**M-OH** 28–12	9,345	
November 30	1:30 p.m.	Eastern Michigan	Western Michigan	Waldo Stadium • Kalamazoo, MI (Michigan MAC Trophy)	ESPN+	**WMU** 26–18		
November 30	3:30 p.m.	Central Michigan	Northern Illinois	Huskie Stadium • DeKalb, IL	CBSSN	**NIU** 24–16	5,843	
^{#}Rankings from AP Poll released prior to game. All times are in Eastern Time.

=== MAC Conference Championship Game ===
Date	Time	Visiting team	Home team	Site	TV	Result	Attendance	Ref.
December 7	12:00 p.m.	**Ohio**	**Miami (OH)**	Ford Field • Detroit, MI (Battle of the Bricks)	ESPN	**OHIO** 38–3	15,478	
^{#}Rankings from College Football Playoff. All times are in Eastern Time.

== Postseason ==
=== Bowl Games ===
Legend
MAC win
MAC loss

Bowl game	Date	Site	Television	Time (EST)	MAC team	Opponent	Score	Attendance
Salute to Veterans Bowl	December 14	Cramton Bowl • Montgomery, AL	ESPN	9:00 p.m.	Western Michigan	South Alabama	L 23–30	12,021
Cure Bowl	December 20	Camping World Stadium • Orlando, FL	ESPN	12:00 p.m.	Ohio	Jacksonville State	W 30–27	10,518
Famous Idaho Potato Bowl	December 23	Albertsons Stadium • Boise, ID	ESPN	2:30 p.m.	Northern Illinois	Fresno State	W 28–20^{2OT}	10,359
GameAbove Sports Bowl	December 26	Ford Field • Detroit, MI	ESPN	2:00 p.m.	Toledo	Pittsburgh	W 48–46^{6OT}	26,919
68 Ventures Bowl	December 26	Hancock Whitney Stadium • Mobile, AL	ESPN	9:00 p.m.	Bowling Green	Arkansas State	L 31–38	19,582
Arizona Bowl	December 28	Arizona Stadium • Tucson, AZ	The CW	4:30 p.m.	Miami (OH)	Colorado State	W 43–17	40,076
Bahamas Bowl	January 4, 2025	Thomas Robinson Stadium • Nassau, The Bahamas	ESPN2	11:00 a.m.	Buffalo	Liberty	W 26–7	4,610

== MAC records vs. other conferences ==
2024–2025 records against non-conference foes:

Regular season

Power Five Conferences	Record
ACC	0–4
Big 12	0–1
Big Ten	0–9
Notre Dame	1–1
Pac-12	0–0
SEC	1–6
Power 5 Total	2–21
Other FBS Conferences	Record
American	0–0
C-USA	1–2
Independents (Excluding Notre Dame)	5–1
Mountain West	1–0
Sun Belt	1–3
Other FBS Total	8–6
FCS Opponents	Record
Football Championship Subdivision	10–1
Total Non-Conference Record	18–23

Postseason

Power Five Conferences	Record
ACC	1–0
Big 12	0–0
Big Ten	0–0
Notre Dame	0–0
Pac-12	0–0
SEC	0–0
Power 5 Total	1–0
Other FBS Conferences	Record
American	0–0
C-USA	2–0
Independents (Excluding Notre Dame)	0–0
Mountain West	2–0
Sun Belt	0–2
Other FBS Total	4–2
Total Bowl Record	5–2

=== Mid-American vs Power 5 matchups ===
This is a list of games the MAC has scheduled versus power conference teams (ACC, Big Ten, Big 12, Pac-12, Notre Dame and SEC). All rankings are from the current AP Poll at the time of the game.

Date	Conference	Visitor	Home	Site	Score
August 30	Big Ten	Western Michigan	Wisconsin	Camp Randall Stadium • Madison, WI	L 14–28
August 31	Big Ten	Miami (OH)	Northwestern	Martin Stadium • Evanston, IL	L 6–13
August 31	ACC	Ohio	Syracuse	JMA Wireless Dome • Syracuse, NY	L 22–38
August 31	ACC	Kent State	Pittsburgh	Acrisure Stadium • Pittsburgh, PA	L 24–55
August 31	Big Ten	Akron	Ohio State	Ohio Stadium • Columbus, OH]	L 6–52
September 7	Big Ten	Bowling Green	Penn State	Beaver Stadium • University Park, PA	L 27-34
September 7	SEC	Buffalo	Missouri	Faurot Field • Columbia, MO	L 0-38
September 7	Independent	Northern Illinois	Notre Dame	Notre Dame Stadium • South Bend, IN	W 16-14
September 7	Big Ten	Eastern Michigan	Washington	Husky Stadium • Seattle, WA	L 9-30
September 7	Big Ten	Akron	Rutgers	SHI Stadium • Piscataway, NJ	L 17-49
September 7	Big Ten	Western Michigan	Ohio State	Ohio Stadium • Columbus, OH	L 0-56
September 14	Big Ten	Central Michigan	Illinois	Memorial Stadium • Champaign, IL	L 9-30
September 14	Big 12	Cincinnati	Miami (OH)	Yager Stadium • Oxford, OH	L 16-27
September 14	ACC	Ball State	Miami (FL)	Hard Rock Stadium • Miami Gardens, FL	L 0-62
September 14	SEC	Kent State	Tennessee	Neyland Stadium • Knoxville, TN	L 0-71
September 14	SEC	Toledo	Mississippi State	Davis Wade Stadium • Starkville, MS	W 41-17
September 21	SEC	Akron	South Carolina	Williams–Brice Stadium • Columbia, SC	L 7-50
September 21	SEC	Ohio	Kentucky	Kroger Field • Lexington, KY	L 6-41
September 21	SEC	Bowling Green	Texas A&M	Kyle Field • College Station, TX	L 20-26
September 21	Big Ten	Kent State	Penn State	Beaver Stadium • University Park, Pennsylvania	L 0-56
September 21	Independent	Miami (OH)	Notre Dame	Notre Dame Stadium • South Bend, IN	L 3-28
September 28	ACC	Northern Illinois	NC State	Carter–Finley Stadium • Raleigh, NC	L 17-24
October 19	SEC	Ball State	Vanderbilt	FirstBank Stadium • Nashville, TN	L 14-24

=== Mid-American vs Group of Five matchups ===
The following games include MAC teams competing against teams from the American, C-USA, Mountain West or Sun Belt.

Date	Conference	Visitor	Home	Site	Score
September 7	Sun Belt	South Alabama	Ohio	Peden Stadium • Athens, OH	W 27-20
September 7	CUSA	Central Michigan	FIU	Riccardo Silva Stadium • Miami, FL	L 16-52
September 14	CUSA	Jacksonville State	Eastern Michigan	Rynearson Stadium • Ypsilanti, MI	W 37-34
September 21	CUSA	Toledo	Western Kentucky	Houchens Industries–L. T. Smith Stadium • Bowling Green, KY	L 21-26
September 28	MWC	San Diego State	Central Michigan	Kelly/Shorts Stadium • Mount Pleasant, MI	W 22-21
September 28	Sun Belt	Old Dominion	Bowling Green	Doyt Perry Stadium • Bowling Green, OH	L 27-30
September 28	Sun Belt	Ball State	James Madison	Bridgeforth Stadium • Harrisonburg, VA	L 7-63
September 28	Sun Belt	Western Michigan	Marshall	Joan C. Edwards Stadium • Huntington, WV	L 20-27

=== Mid-American vs FBS independents matchups ===
The following games include MAC teams competing against FBS Independents, which includes UConn or UMass.

Date	Visitor	Home	Site	Score
August 31	Eastern Michigan	UMass	McGuirk Alumni Stadium • Hadley, MA	W 28–14
September 7	UMass	Toledo	Glass Bowl • Toledo, OH	W 38-23
September 14	UMass	Buffalo	UB Stadium • Buffalo, NY	W 34-3
September 28	UMass	Miami (OH)	Yager Stadium • Oxford, OH	W 23-20
September 28	Buffalo	UConn	Rentschler Field • East Hartford, CT	L 3-47
October 5	UMass	Northern Illinois	Huskie Stadium • DeKalb, IL	W 34-20

=== Mid-American vs. FCS matchups ===
The following games include MAC teams competing against FCS schools.

Date	Visitor	Home	Site	Score
August 29	Fordham	Bowling Green	Doyt Perry Stadium • Bowling Green, OH	W 41–17
August 29	Lafayette	Buffalo	UB Stadium • Buffalo, NY	W 30–13
August 31	Central Connecticut	Central Michigan	Kelly/Shorts Stadium • Mount Pleasant, MI	W 66–10
August 29	Duquesne	Toledo	Glass Bowl • Toledo, OH	W 49–10
August 31	Western Illinois	Northern Illinois	Huskie Stadium • DeKalb, IL	W 54–15
September 7	Missouri State	Ball State	Scheumann Stadium • Muncie, IN	W 42-34
September 7	Saint Francis (PA)	Kent State	Dix Stadium • Kent, OH	L 17-23
September 14	Morgan State	Ohio	Peden Stadium • Athens, OH	W 21-6
September 14	Colgate	Akron	InfoCision Stadium • Akron, OH	W 31-20
September 14	Bethune-Cookman	Western Michigan	Waldo Stadium • Kalamazoo, MI	W 59-31
September 21	Saint Francis (PA)	Eastern Michigan	Rynearson Stadium • Ypsilanti, MI	W 36-0

== Head to head matchups ==
2024 MAC Head to head
Team	Akron	Ball State	Bowling Green	Buffalo	Central Michigan	Eastern Michigan	Kent State	Miami	Northern Illinois	Ohio	Toledo	Western Michigan
Akron	—	—	20–27	30–41	—	25–21	38–17	—	16–29	10–30	21–14	24–34
Ball State	—	—	13–38	48–51	34–37	—	37–35	21–27	25–23	21–42	—	42–45
Bowling Green	27–20	38–13	—	—	23–13	—	27–6	12–28	7–17	—	41–26	31–13
Buffalo	41–30	51–48	—	—	—	37–20	43–7	—	23–20	16–47	30–15	41–48
Central Michigan	—	37–34	13–23	—	—	34–38	—	7–46	16–24	25–27	10–37	16–15
Eastern Michigan	21–25	—	—	20–37	38–34	—	52–33	14–38	—	10–35	28–29	18–26
Kent State	17–38	35–37	6–27	7–43	—	33–52	—	7–34	—	0–41	—	21–52
Miami	—	27–21	28–12	—	46–7	38–14	34–7	—	20–9	30–20	20–30	—
Northern Illinois	29–16	23–25	17–7	20–23	24–16	—	—	9–20	—	—	6–13	42–28
Ohio	30–10	42–21	—	47–16	27–25	35–10	41–0	20–30	—	—	24–7	—
Toledo	14–21	—	26–41	15–30	37–10	29–28	—	30–20	13–6	7–24	—	—
Western Michigan	34–24	45–42	13–31	48–41	14–16	26–18	52–21	—	28–42	—	—	—

Updated through end of regular season.

== Awards and honors ==
=== Player of the week honors ===
Week	Offensive			Defensive			Special Teams		
Week	Player	Team	Position	Player	Team	Position	Player	Team	Position
Week 1	Ethan Hampton	Northern Illinois	QB	Shaun Dolac; James Djonkam	Buffalo; Eastern Michigan	LB	Justin Pegues	Bowling Green	RB/KR
Week 2	Antario Brown	Northern Illinois	RB	Devonte O'Malley	Northern Illinois	DT	Cade Haberman; Jesús Gómez	Northern Illinois; Eastern Michigan	DT; PK
Week 3	Tucker Gleason	Toledo	QB	Red Murdock	Buffalo	LB	Jesús Gómez (2); Dylan Cunanan	Eastern Michigan; Toledo	K PK
Week 4	Harold Fannin Jr. B.J. Harris	Bowling Green; Central Michigan	TE; RB	Shaun Dolac (2)	Buffalo	LB	Jesús Gómez (3)	Eastern Michigan	K
Week 5	Harold Fannin Jr. (2); Parker Navarro	Bowling Green; Ohio	TE; QB	Luke Murphy	Eastern Michigan	LB	Tristan Mattson; Dom Dzioban	Central Michigan; Miami (OH)	K
Week 6	Hayden Wolff; Harold Fannin Jr. (3)	Western Michigan; Bowling Green	QB; TE	Darius Alexander	Toledo	DT	Dylan Cunanan (2)	Toledo	K
Week 7	Chrishon McCray	Kent State	WR	Shaun Dolac (3); Skyler Gill-Howard	Buffalo; Northern Illinois	LB; DT	Ethan Duane	Buffalo	P
Week 8	Cole Snyder; Blake Bosma	Eastern Michigan; Western Michigan	QB; TE	Matt Salopek; Maxen Hook	Miami (OH); Toledo	LB; S	Tristan Mattson (2); Jesús Gómez (4)	Central Michigan; Eastern Michigan	K
Week 9	Coleman Owen	Ohio	WR	Shay Taylor	Ohio	LB	Dom Dzioban (2)	Miami (OH)	K
Week 10/11	Telly Johnson Jr. Tucker Gleason (2)	Northern Illinois; Toledo	RB; QB	Matt Salopek (2)	Miami	LB	Eamonn Dennis; Cam Thompson	Ohio; Northern Illinois	WR/KR
Week 12	Parker Navarro (2)	Ohio	QB	Shaun Dolac (4)	Buffalo	LB	Emilio Duran	Toledo	P
Week 13	Parker Navarro (3); Rahkeem Smith	Ohio; Bowling Green	QB; WR	Shaun Dolac (5); James Djonkam (2)	Buffalo; Eastern Michigan	LB	Tristan Mattson (3)	Central Michigan	K
Week 14	Brett Gabbert; Parker Navarro (4)	Miami (OH); Ohio	QB	James Djonkam (3)	Eastern Michigan	LB	JaVaughn Byrd	Northern Illinois	CB

=== MAC Individual Awards ===
The following individuals received postseason honors as voted by the Mid-American Conference football coaches at the end of the season.

Award	Player	School
Offensive Player of the Year	Harold Fannin Jr.	Bowling Green
Defensive Player of the Year	Shaun Dolac	Buffalo
Special Teams Player of the Year	Malcolm Gillie	Ball State
Freshman Player of the Year	Kadin Semonza	Ball State
Vern Smith Leadership Award	Harold Fannin Jr.	Bowling Green
Coach of the Year	Tim Albin	Ohio

=== All-Conference Teams ===
The following players were listed as part of the All-Conference teams.

Position	Player	Team
First Team Offense
QB	Brett Gabbert	Miami
OL	Alex Wollschlaeger	Bowling Green
OL	Reid Holskey	Miami
OL	J.J. Lippe	Northern Illinois
OL	Addison West	Western Michigan
OL	Jacob Gideon	Western Michigan
TE	Harold Fannin Jr.	Bowling Green
WR	Javon Tracy	Miami
WR	Coleman Owen	Ohio
WR	Jerjuan Newton	Toledo
WR	Junior Vandeross III	Toledo
RB	Terion Stewart	Bowling Green
RB	Jaden Nixon	Western Michigan
PK	Dom Dzioban	Miami
First Team Defense
DL	CJ Nunnally	Akron
DL	Brian Ugwu	Miami
DL	Devonte O’Malley	Northern Illinois
DL	Bradley Weaver	Ohio
LB	Joseph Sipp Jr.	Bowling Green
LB	Shaun Dolac	Buffalo
LB	Red Murdock	Buffalo
LB	Matt Salopek	Miami
DB	Jordan Oladokun	Bowling Green
DB	Raion Strader	Miami
DB	Nate Valcarcel	Northern Illinois
DB	Maxen Hook	Toledo
P	Avery Book	Akron
First Team Specialists
KRS	Malcolm Gillie	Ball State
KRS	Jacquez Stuart	Toledo

Position	Player	Team
Second Team Offense
QB	Parker Navarro	Ohio
OL	Jon Mucciolo	Ball State
OL	Brayden Swartout	Central Michigan
OL	John Champe	Northern Illinois
OL	Logan Zschernitz	Northern Illinois
OL	Parker Titsworth	Ohio
OL	Carson Heidecker	Ohio
TE	Tanner Koziol	Ball State
WR	Adrian Norton	Akron
WR	Oran Singleton	Eastern Michigan
WR	Chrishon McCray	Kent State
WR	Reggie Virgil	Miami
RB	Keyon Mozee	Miami
RB	Anthony Tyus III	Ohio
PK	Jesús Gómez	Eastern Michigan
Second Team Defense
DL	Kobe Stewart	Buffalo
DL	Corey Suttle	Miami
DL	Roy Williams	Northern Illinois
DL	Darius Alexander	Toledo
LB	Bryan McCoy	Akron
LB	Jordan Kwiatkowski	Central Michigan
LB	James Djonkam	Eastern Michigan
LB	Ty Wise	Miami
DB	Donte Kent	Central Michigan
DB	DJ Walker	Ohio
DB	Avery Smith	Toledo
DB	Tate Hallock	Western Michigan
P	John Henderson	Bowling Green
Second Team Specialists
KRS	Donte Kent	Central Michigan
KRS	Bryson Hammer	Toledo

Position	Player	Team
Third Team Offense
QB	Connor Bazelak	Bowling Green
OL	Ethan Crowe	Ball State
OL	Taran Tyo	Ball State
OL	Trevor Brock	Buffalo
OL	Tyler Doty	Buffalo
OL	Ethan Spoth	Toledo
TE	Blake Bosma	Western Michigan
WR	Cam Pickett	Ball State
WR	Victor Snow	Buffalo
WR	Terry Lockett	Eastern Michigan
WR	Luke Floriea	Kent State
RB	Al-Jay Henderson	Buffalo
RB	Marion Lukes	Central Michigan
PK	Upton Bellenfant	Buffalo
Third Team Defense
DL	Brandon Berger	Ball State
DL	Anthony Hawkins	Bowling Green
DL	Dion Crawford	Buffalo
DL	Skyler Gill-Howard	Northern Illinois
LB	Shay Taylor	Ohio
LB	Blake Leake	Ohio
LB	Daniel Bolden	Toledo
LB	Donald Willis	Western Michigan
DB	Paul Lewis III	Akron
DB	Jacorey Benjamin	Bowling Green
DB	Eli Blakey	Miami
DB	JaVaughn Byrd	Northern Illinois
P	Ethan Duane	Buffalo
Third Team Specialists
KRS	DaShawn Martin	Kent State
KRS	Coleman Owen	Ohio

=== All-Americans ===
Position	Player	School	Selector	Consensus
First Team All-Americans
WR	Harold Fannin Jr.	Bowling Green	(FWAA)	
TE	Harold Fannin Jr.	Bowling Green	(AFCA, AP, WCFF, PFF, SI, USAT)	✓
OL	Addison West	Western Michigan	(AP, FWAA, WCFF, PFF)	✓
LB	Shaun Dolac	Buffalo	(AP, FWAA, TSN, WCFF, Athletic, CBS, ESPN, PFF)	✓

Position	Player	School	Selector
Second Team All-Americans
TE	Harold Fannin Jr.	Bowling Green	(TSN, Athletic, CBS, ESPN)
OL	Jacob Gideon	Western Michigan	(TSN)
OL	Addison West	Western Michigan	(CBS)
LB	Shaun Dolac	Buffalo	(AFCA, SI, USAT)

== NFL draft ==
The NFL draft will be held at Lambeau Field in Green Bay, Wisconsin. The following list includes all MAC players in the draft.

=== List of selections ===
Player	Position	School	Draft round	Round pick	Overall pick	Team
Darius Alexander	DT	Toledo	3	1	65	New York Giants
Harold Fannin Jr.	TE	Bowling Green	3	3	67	Cleveland Browns
Bilhal Kone	CB	Western Michigan	6	2	178	Baltimore Ravens
Donte Kent	CB	Central Michigan	7	13	229	Pittsburgh Steelers
