= Ronald Kent Jr. =

American football player (born 1999)

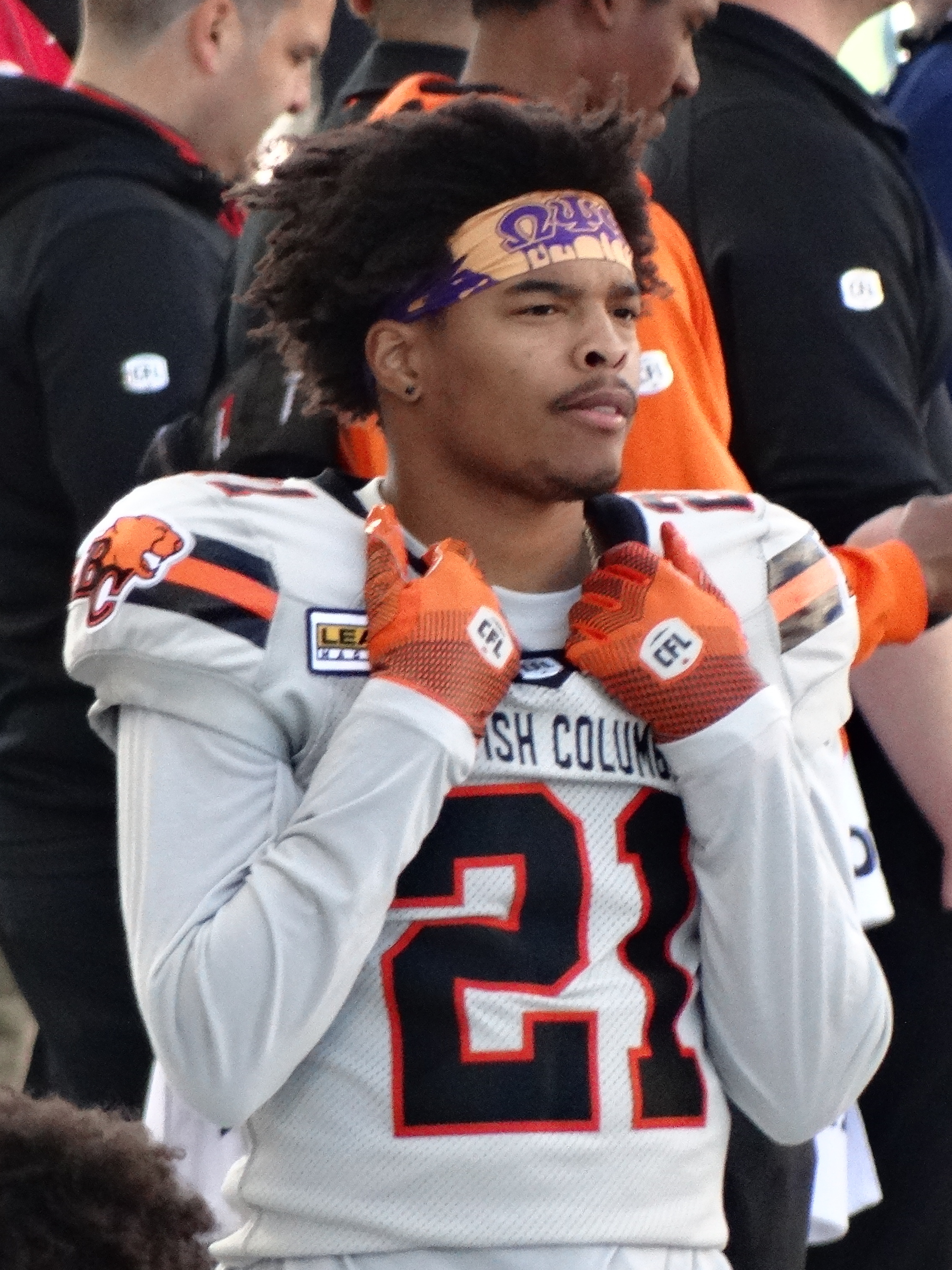
- Kent Jr. with the BC Lions in 2024

No. 21 – BC Lions
- Position: Defensive back
- Roster status: Active
- CFL status: American

Personal information
- Born: November 7, 1999 (age 27); Harrisburg, Pennsylvania, U.S.
- Listed height: 5 ft 9 in (1.75 m)
- Listed weight: 180 lb (82 kg)

Career information
- High school: Harrisburg (PA)
- College: Western Carolina (2018–2021); Central Michigan (2022)

Career history
- 2024–present: BC Lions

Awards and highlights
- 2× Second-team All-SoCon (2020–2021)
- Stats at CFL.ca

Ronald Lewis Kent Jr. (born November 7, 1999) is an American professional football defensive back for the BC Lions of the Canadian Football League (CFL). He played college football at Western Carolina and Central Michigan.

== Early life ==
Kent Jr. played high school football at Harrisburg High School in Harrisburg, Pennsylvania. He recorded 22 receptions for 287 yards and three touchdowns his junior year and 21 receptions for 385 yards and one touchdown his senior year. He totaled 27 tackles and five interceptions on defense his senior year, earning first-team PennLive defensive all-star honors. Kent Jr. also wrestled in high school.

== College career ==
Kent Jr. played college football for the Western Carolina Catamounts from 2018 to 2021. He played in all 11 games, starting seven, in 2018, accumulating 45 tackles, 12 pass breakups, and one forced fumble. His pass breakup total lead the team that year. Kent Jr. also garnered Southern Conference (SoCon) All-Freshman recognition, and was named a Freshman All-American by both Phil Steele and HERO Sports. He started 11 games in 2019, and missed the final game of the season. He recorded 32 tackles, seven pass breakups, and one fumble recovery. Kent Jr. started all nine games during the COVID-19 shortened 2020 season, totaling 47 tackles, one interception, two pass breakups, and one forced fumble, earning second-team All-SoCon honors from the coaches. He started all 11 games in 2021, totaling 38 tackles, one interception, six pass breakups, one forced fumble, and one fumble recovery. He was named second-team All-SoCon by the SoCon Sports Media Association and third-team All-SoCon by Phil Steele.

Kent Jr. transferred to play for the Central Michigan Chippewas in 2022. He appeared in all 12 games, starting 10, accumulating 56 tackles, one sack, and 10 pass breakups.

== Professional career ==
Pre-draft measurables
Height	Weight	Arm length	Hand span	Wingspan	40-yard dash	10-yard split	20-yard split	20-yard shuttle	Three-cone drill	Vertical jump	Broad jump	Bench press
5 ft 9 in (1.75 m)	177 lb (80 kg)	30 1/8 in (0.77 m)	8 3/8 in (0.21 m)	6 ft 0 1/4 in (1.84 m)	4.61 s	1.63 s	2.69 s	4.44 s	7.31 s	32.5 in (0.83 m)	9 ft 8 in (2.95 m)	13 reps
All values from Pro Day

Kent Jr. went undrafted in the 2023 NFL draft.

Kent Jr. signed with the BC Lions of the Canadian Football League (CFL) on January 24, 2024.

On August 29, 2026, Kent Jr. was placed on the Lions' reserve roster after suffering a hip injury earlier that week. He rejoined the active roster on September 3, 2026. On September 17, 2026, Kent Jr. was suspended by the CFL for one game, after he incited an on-field incident during the Lions' game against the Allouettes on September 12, 2026. He rejoined the active roster on October 2, 2026, after his suspension was lifted.

== Personal life ==
His brother, Donte Kent Jr. played college football with Central Michigan, and was drafted by the Pittsburgh Steelers in the 2025 NFL draft.
