= Junior Vandeross III =

American football player (born 2003)

Profile
- Position: Wide receiver

Personal information
- Born: September 12, 2003 (age 23); Tampa, Florida, U.S.
- Listed height: 5 ft 8 in (1.73 m)
- Listed weight: 182 lb (83 kg)

Career information
- High school: Jesuit (Tampa)
- College: Toledo (2022–2025)
- NFL draft: 2026: undrafted

Awards and highlights
- 2× First-team All-MAC (2024, 2025); 2024 GameAbove Sports Bowl MVP
- Stats at ESPN

Jessie Lee Vandeross III (born September 12, 2003) is an American professional football wide receiver. He played college football for the Toledo Rockets and went undrafted in the 2026 NFL draft.

== Early life ==
Vandeross was born on September 12, 2003, in Tampa, Florida. He attended Jesuit High School in Tampa and helped them to an undefeated record and state title in his senior year. Along with primarily playing wide receiver, he also played cornerback and returned punts. A three-star recruit according to 247Sports, he committed to Toledo prior to his senior season over nine other offers from schools including Iowa, Iowa State, Kentucky, Louisville, and UCF.

== College career ==
Vandeross contributed mainly on special teams in his first year. He began contributing as a wide receiver during his second year and after. After his junior season in 2024, he was named First-team All-MAC.

Prior to the start of the 2025 season, Vandeross was named to the Biletnikoff Award watchlist. He was also one of five Rockets named to the preseason East-West Shrine Bowl watchlist. He was again named First-team All-MAC and opted to play in The American Bowl after the season.

== Professional career ==
Pre-draft measurables
Height	Weight	Arm length	Hand span	Wingspan	40-yard dash	10-yard split	20-yard split	20-yard shuttle	Three-cone drill	Vertical jump	Broad jump
5 ft 7 7/8 in (1.72 m)	180 lb (82 kg)	31 5/8 in (0.80 m)	9 1/8 in (0.23 m)	6 ft 0 in (1.83 m)	4.66 s	1.55 s	2.51 s	4.50 s	7.13 s	31 1/2 in (0.80 m)	9 ft 5 in (2.87 m)
All values from Pro Day

Vandeross went undrafted in the 2026 NFL draft. He was not signed by any team after the draft. On May 8, 2026, he accepted an invite to the Tampa Bay Buccaneers minicamp on a tryout basis.

== Personal life ==
Vandeross was born to Denis Lopez and Nina Vandeross. He has one brother and one sister. His father died when he was only three years old of a heart attack and he credits his mother with instating a hardworking spirit in him.

== Legal Issues ==
On July 4, 2025, Vandeross was arrested for assault and domestic violence (both misdemeanors) after reportedly strangling and shoving the mother of his newborn child into a wall. There was subsequent pending hearings to seal the case records, but he failed to appear in court on February 2, 2026, and a bench warrant was issued. A spokesperson from the University of Toledo declined to comment on the situation. His pretrial date is set for July 7, 2026.
