= Harrisburg High School (Pennsylvania) =

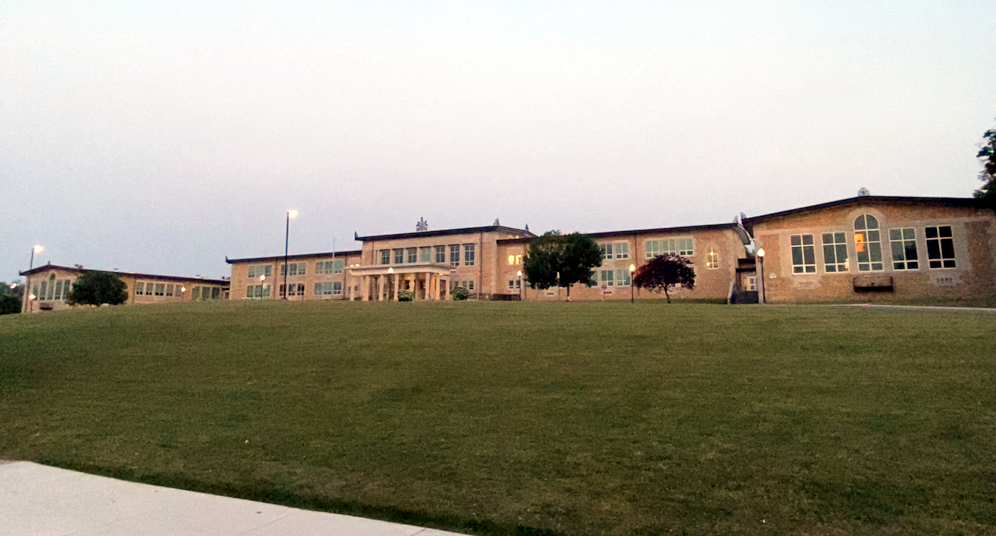
- Harrisburg High School as seen from Market Street

Location
- 1601 State Street; Harrisburg, Dauphin County, Pennsylvania 17103-1466; United States; 40.2709°N 76.8471°W

Information
- Type: Public
- Opened: 1971; 55 years ago (merger of two schools)
- School district: Harrisburg School District
- Principal: Michelle Felton
- Faculty
- Grades: 9–12
- Enrollment: 1,343 (2024-2025)
- Language: English
- Colors: Black and gray
- Nickname: Cougars
- Feeder schools: Harrisburg High School, SciTech Campus
- Website: Harrisburg High School Website
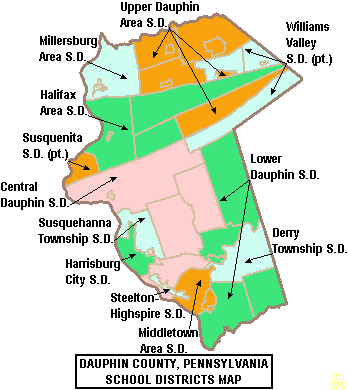

Harrisburg High School is a public high school located in Harrisburg, Pennsylvania. This large urban high school is one of two public high schools operated by the Harrisburg City School District. In 2021–22, Harrisburg High School enrollment was reported as 1,187 pupils in 9th through 12th grades, with 664 males and 523 females. The graduation rate was 67.5%. According to the PA Department of Education 2% of the teachers were rated "Non‐Highly Qualified" under the federal No Child Left Behind Act. The school is a federally designated Title I school.

== History ==
The school first opened in 1971 as a merger of John Harris High School, which opened 1926, and William Penn High School. John Harris High School now refers to a campus of Harrisburg High.

== Extracurriculars ==
Harrisburg High School offers a wide variety of clubs, activities and an extensive, publicly funded sports program.

Harrisburg High School offers Marching Cougars Band, Concert Band, and a Jazz Ensemble. The school also offers a US Navy Junior ROTC program.

=== Sports ===
The district provides these high school sports:

Boys

- Baseball – AAAAAA
- Basketball- AAAAAA
- Football – AAAAAA
- Soccer – AAAA
- Track and Field – AAA
- Wrestling – AAA

Girls

- Basketball – AAAAAA
- Softball – AAAAAA
- Girls' Tennis – AAA
- Track and Field – AAA
- Volleyball – AAAA

According to PIAA directory May 2019

== Notable alumni ==
- Cameron Artis-Payne – former NFL running back for the Carolina Panthers
- Miriam Barnes – professional hurdler and sprinter
- Phil Davis – current mixed martial arts fighter for Bellator MMA
- Charles Dudley – NBA Champion with the Golden State Warriors
- Dennis Green – former NFL Head Coach (Vikings, Cardinals)
- Dan Hartman – musician, singer, songwriter, and record producer
- Ray Isom – former NFL defensive back for the Tampa Bay Buccaneers
- Rickey Isom – former NFL running back for the Miami Dolphins
- Jimmy Jones – former quarterback for USC and CFL champion quarterback
- Donte Kent – NFL cornerback
- Ronald Kent Jr. – CFL defensive back
- Danny Lansanah – former NFL linebacker
- Ashley Langford – head women's basketball coach, Tulane University
- Micah Parsons – No. 4 ranked high school football player in the class of 2018, current defensive end and linebacker for the Green Bay Packers
- Hank Poteat – former NFL cornerback
- Adrian Robinson – former NFL linebacker (Steelers, Broncos, Chargers, Redskins)
- Ed Temple – women's track and field coach at Tennessee State University and coach of many Olympians
- Kenny Watson – former NFL running back
- Jan White – former NFL tight end for the Buffalo Bills
- Tom Buskey – former MLB pitcher
