= 2024 Pittsburgh Panthers football team =

American college football season

2024 Pittsburgh Panthers football

GameAbove Sports Bowl, L 46–48 ^{6OT} vs. Toledo
- Conference: Atlantic Coast Conference
- Record: 7–6 (3–5 ACC)
- Head coach: Pat Narduzzi (10th season)
- Offensive coordinator: Kade Bell (1st season)
- Offensive scheme: Hurry-up, no-huddle spread
- Defensive coordinator: Randy Bates (7th season)
- Base defense: 4–3
- Home stadium: Acrisure Stadium

Uniform
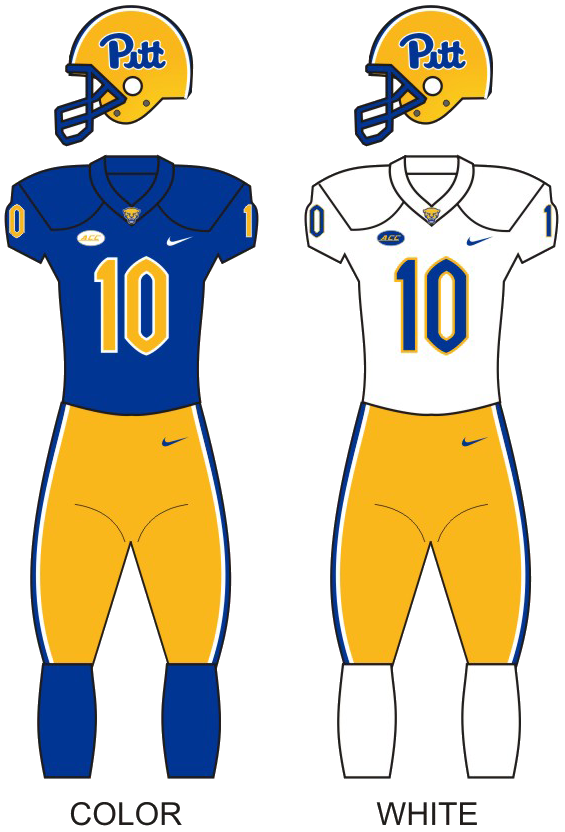

2024 Atlantic Coast Conference football standings
| | Conf. | | | Overall |
| Team | W | | L | W | | L |
|---|---|---|---|---|---|---|
| No. 12 SMU y^ | 8 | – | 0 | 11 | – | 3 |
| No. 14 Clemson y$^ | 7 | – | 1 | 10 | – | 4 |
| No. 18 Miami (FL) | 6 | – | 2 | 10 | – | 3 |
| No. 20 Syracuse | 5 | – | 3 | 10 | – | 3 |
| Duke | 5 | – | 3 | 9 | – | 4 |
| Louisville | 5 | – | 3 | 9 | – | 4 |
| Georgia Tech | 5 | – | 3 | 7 | – | 6 |
| Boston College | 4 | – | 4 | 7 | – | 6 |
| Virginia Tech | 4 | – | 4 | 6 | – | 7 |
| Pittsburgh | 3 | – | 5 | 7 | – | 6 |
| NC State | 3 | – | 5 | 6 | – | 7 |
| North Carolina | 3 | – | 5 | 6 | – | 7 |
| Virginia | 3 | – | 5 | 5 | – | 7 |
| California | 2 | – | 6 | 6 | – | 7 |
| Wake Forest | 2 | – | 6 | 4 | – | 8 |
| Stanford | 2 | – | 6 | 3 | – | 9 |
| Florida State | 1 | – | 7 | 2 | – | 10 |
Championship: Clemson 34, SMU 31
^ – College Football Playoff participant; $ – Conference champion; y – Championship game participant; Rankings from AP Poll

The 2024 Pittsburgh Panthers football team represented the University of Pittsburgh as a member of the Atlantic Coast Conference (ACC) during the 2024 NCAA Division I FBS football season. The Panthers were led by tenth-year head coach Pat Narduzzi and played their home games at Acrisure Stadium located in Pittsburgh.

Following their win over Syracuse, Pitt began their season 7–0 for the first time since 1982. Despite this, they closed out the season losing the last six games in a row, finishing at 7–6.

The Panthers were the second team in college football history to start a season 7–0 and lose their final six games to finish 7–6, after South Florida in 2018.

== Transfers ==
=== Outgoing ===
| Name | Pos. | New school |
|---|---|---|
| Lorenzo Jenkins | WR | Bethune-Cookman |
| Aydin Henningham | LB | Albany State |
| Buddy Mack | S | South Carolina |
| DeAndre Jules | EDGE | South Carolina |
| Trey Anderson | IOL | Utah State |
| Stephon Hall | S | Youngstown State |
| T.J. Harvison | RB | None |
| Bangally Kamara | LB | South Carolina |
| Addison Copeland | WR | Coffeyville Community College |
| Samuel Okunlola | DL | Colorado |
| Byron Floyd | LS | Buffalo |
| Sam Vander Haar | P | BYU |
| Christian Veilleux | QB | Georgia State |
| Dayon Hayes | DE | Colorado |

=== Incoming ===
| Name | Pos. | Previous school |
|---|---|---|
| Nick James | DL | Indiana |
| Jake Overman | TE | Oregon State |
| Lyndon Cooper | IOL | NC State |
| Nate Matlack | EDGE | Kansas State |
| David Ojiegbe | EDGE | Clemson |
| Desmond Reid | RB | Western Carolina |
| Tamon Lynum | CB | Nebraska |
| Keye Thompson | LB | Ohio |
| Raphael Williams Jr. | WR | San Diego State |
| Censere Lee | WR | Western Carolina |
| Eli Holstein | QB | Alabama |

== Preseason ==
=== ACC media poll ===
The Atlantic Coast Conference preseason poll was released on July 31. Pittsburgh was predicted to finish 13th in the conference.

| Predicted finish | Team | Votes (1st place) |
|---|---|---|
| 1 | Florida State | 2,708 (81) |
| 2 | Clemson | 2,657 (55) |
| 3 | Miami | 2,344 (17) |
| 4 | NC State | 2,318 (8) |
| 5 | Louisville | 1,984 |
| 6 | Virginia Tech | 1,968 (5) |
| 7 | SMU | 1,798 |
| 8 | North Carolina | 1,712 |
| 9 | Georgia Tech | 1,539 (1) |
| 10 | California | 1,095 (2) |
| 11 | Duke | 1,056 |
| 12 | Syracuse | 1,035 |
| 13 | Pittsburgh | 1,016 |
| 14 | Boston College | 890 (1) |
| 15 | Wake Forest | 784 |
| 16 | Virginia | 629 |
| 17 | Stanford | 477 |

== Schedule ==
| Date | Time | Opponent | Rank | Site | TV | Result | Attendance |
|---|---|---|---|---|---|---|---|
| August 31 | 12:00 p.m. | Kent State* | | Acrisure Stadium; Pittsburgh, PA | ESPNU | W 55–24 | 44,616 |
| September 7 | 12:00 p.m. | at Cincinnati* | | Nippert Stadium; Cincinnati, OH (River City Rivalry) | ESPN2 | W 28–27 | 37,992 |
| September 14 | 3:30 p.m. | West Virginia* | | Acrisure Stadium; Pittsburgh, PA (Backyard Brawl) | ESPN2 | W 38–34 | 66,087 |
| September 21 | 3:30 p.m. | Youngstown State* | | Acrisure Stadium; Pittsburgh, PA | ACCNX/ESPN+ | W 73–17 | 48,437 |
| October 5 | 12:00 p.m. | at North Carolina | | Kenan Memorial Stadium; Chapel Hill, NC | ESPN2 | W 34–24 | 46,033 |
| October 12 | 3:30 p.m. | California | No. 22 | Acrisure Stadium; Pittsburgh, PA | ESPN | W 17–15 | 49,773 |
| October 24 | 7:30 p.m. | Syracuse | No. 19 | Acrisure Stadium; Pittsburgh, PA (rivalry) | ESPN | W 41–13 | 47,266 |
| November 2 | 8:00 p.m. | at No. 20 SMU | No. 18 | Gerald J. Ford Stadium; University Park, TX | ACCN | L 25–48 | 34,648 |
| November 9 | 8:00 p.m. | Virginia | No. 18 | Acrisure Stadium; Pittsburgh, PA | ACCN | L 19–24 | 56,693 |
| November 16 | 12:00 p.m. | No. 20 Clemson | | Acrisure Stadium; Pittsburgh, PA | ESPN | L 20–24 | 58,667 |
| November 23 | 4:00 p.m. | at Louisville | | L&N Federal Credit Union Stadium; Louisville, KY | ESPN2 | L 9–37 | 49,441 |
| November 30 | 3:00 p.m. | at Boston College | | Alumni Stadium; Chestnut Hill, MA | The CW | L 23–34 | 29,704 |
| December 26 | 2:00 p.m. | vs. Toledo* | | Ford Field; Detroit, MI (GameAbove Sports Bowl) | ESPN | L 46–48 ^{6OT} | 26,219 |
*Non-conference game; Rankings from AP Poll (and CFP Rankings, after November 5) - Released prior to game; All times are in Eastern time

== Game summaries ==
=== Kent State ===
Game One – Kent State Golden Flashes (0–0) at Pittsburgh Panthers (0–0) – Game summary

| Quarter | 1 | 2 | 3 | 4 | Total |
|---|---|---|---|---|---|
| Golden Flashes | 7 | 7 | 10 | 0 | 24 |
| Panthers | 14 | 14 | 14 | 13 | 55 |

at Acrisure Stadium, Pittsburgh, Pennsylvania

- Date: August 31
- Game time: 12:00 p.m. EDT
- Game weather: Sunny • Temperature: 82 °F (28 °C) • Wind: SW at 3 miles per hour (4.8 km/h)
- Game attendance: 44,616
- Referee: Tim Hedgepeth
- TV announcers (ESPNU): Matt Schumacker (play-by-play) and Dustin Fox (analyst)

Game information

First quarter

- (11:56) PITT – Konata Mumpfield 11-yard pass from Eli Holstein, Ben Sauls kick (Drive: 9 plays, 95 yards, 2:59; Pittsburgh 7–0)
- (10:15) PITT – Desmond Reid 78-yard punt return, Ben Sauls kick (Pittsburgh 14–0)
- (6:43) KSU – Luke Floriea 36-yard pass from Devin Kargman, Andrew Glass kick (Drive: 8 plays, 75 yards, 3:32; Pittsburgh 14–7)

Second quarter

- (13:10) PITT – Derrick Davis Jr. 2-yard run, Ben Sauls kick (Drive: 13 plays, 79 yards, 3:55; Pittsburgh 21–7)
- (7:50) PITT – Raphael Williams 7-yard pass from Eli Holstein, Ben Sauls kick (Drive: 8 plays, 55 yards, 3:08; Pittsburgh 28–7)
- (5:28) KSU – Naim Muhammad 34-yard fumble recovery, Andrew Glass kick (Pittsburgh 28–14)

Third quarter

- (9:36) KSU – Chrishon McCray 29-yard pass from Devin Kargman, Andrew Glass kick (Drive: 11 plays, 75 yards, 5:24; Pittsburgh 28–21)
- (8:39) PITT – Desmond Reid 46-yard run, Ben Sauls kick (Drive: 3 plays, 69 yards, 0:52; Pittsburgh 35–21)
- (5:48) KSU – Andrew Glass 36-yard field goal (Drive: 8 plays, 57 yards, 2:51; Pittsburgh 35–24)
- (3:34) PITT – Kenny Johnson 10-yard pass from Eli Holstein, Ben Sauls kick (Drive: 7 plays, 75 yards, 2:14; Pittsburgh 42–24)

Fourth quarter

- (11:52) PITT – Ben Sauls 50-yard field goal (Drive: 5 plays, 24 yards, 1:41; Pittsburgh 45–24)
- (9:32) PITT – Raphael Williams 6-yard pass from Nate Yarnell, Ben Sauls kick (Drive: 5 plays, 55 yards, 1:59; Pittsburgh 52–24)
- (1:47) PITT – Ben Sauls 39-yard field goal (Drive: 11 plays, 32 yards, 2:38; Pittsburgh 55–24)

| Statistics | KENT | PITT |
|---|---|---|
| First downs | 15 | 31 |
| Total yards | 212 | 560 |
| Rushing yards | 31 | 191 |
| Passing yards | 181 | 369 |
| Passing: Comp–Att–Int | 14–28–1 | 34–48–1 |
| Time of possession | 32:26 | 27:34 |

| Team | Category | Player | Statistics |
|---|---|---|---|
| Kent State | Passing | Devin Kargman | 14/28, 181 yards, 2 TD, INT |
| Kent State | Rushing | Ky Thomas | 18 carries, 40 yards |
| Kent State | Receiving | Luke Floriea | 6 receptions, 104 yards, TD |
| Pittsburgh | Passing | Eli Holstein | 30/40, 336 yards, 3 TD, INT |
| Pittsburgh | Rushing | Desmond Reid | 14 carries, 145 yards, TD |
| Pittsburgh | Receiving | Kenny Johnson | 7 receptions, 105 yards, TD |

=== at Cincinnati ===
Game Two – Pittsburgh Panthers (1–0) vs Cincinnati Bearcats (1–0) – Game summary

| Quarter | 1 | 2 | 3 | 4 | Total |
|---|---|---|---|---|---|
| Panthers | 3 | 3 | 7 | 15 | 28 |
| Bearcats | 14 | 3 | 10 | 0 | 27 |

at Nippert Stadium, Cincinnati, Ohio

- Date: September 7
- Game time: 12:00 p.m. EDT
- Game weather: Sunny • Temperature: 62 °F (17 °C) • Wind: N at 12 miles per hour (19 km/h)
- Game attendance: 37,992
- Referee: Adam Savoie
- TV announcers (ESPN2): Roy Philpott (play-by-play), Sam Acho (analyst), and Taylor Davis (sideline reporter)

Game information

First quarter

- (7:47) CIN – Jamoi Mayes 52-yard pass from Brendan Sorsby, Carter Brown kick (Drive: 4 plays, 80 yards, 1:20; Cincinnati 7–0)
- (3:52) PITT – Ben Sauls 47-yard field goal (Drive: 10 plays, 48 yards, 3:50; Cincinnati 7–3)
- (1:11) CIN – Tony Johnson 5-yard pass from Brendan Sorsby, Carter Brown kick (Drive: 6 plays, 75 yards, 2:41; Cincinnati 14–3)

Second quarter

- (8:11) CIN – Carter Brown 49-yard field goal (Drive: 14 plays, 31 yards, 7:14; Cincinnati 17–3)
- (0:00) PITT – Ben Sauls 53-yard field goal (Drive: 4 plays, 45 yards, 0:23; Cincinnati 17–6)

Third quarter

- (7:25) CIN – Joe Royer 16-yard pass from Brendan Sorsby, Carter Brown kick (Drive: 10 plays, 58 yards, 5:13; Cincinnati 24–6)
- (4:50) CIN – Carter Brown 26-yard field goal (Drive: 6 plays, 31 yards, 1:59; Cincinnati 27–6)
- (0:46) PITT – Konata Mumpfield 11-yard pass from Eli Holstein, Ben Sauls kick (Drive: 10 plays, 75 yards, 4:04; Cincinnati 27–13)

Fourth quarter

- (10:41) PITT – Konata Mumpfield 38-yard pass from Eli Holstein (Drive: 7 plays, 82 yards, 3:23; Cincinnati 27–19)
- (5:40) PITT – Desmond Reid 56-yard pass from Eli Holstein (Drive: 7 plays, 94 yards, 2:04; Cincinnati 27–25)
- (0:17) PITT – Ben Sauls 35-yard field goal (Drive: 9 plays, 63 yards, 2:21; Pittsburgh 28–27)

| Statistics | PITT | CIN |
|---|---|---|
| First downs | 24 | 21 |
| Total yards | 498 | 449 |
| Rushing yards | 196 | 151 |
| Passing yards | 302 | 298 |
| Passing: Comp–Att–Int | 20–35–1 | 22–38–0 |
| Time of possession | 23:35 | 36:25 |

| Team | Category | Player | Statistics |
|---|---|---|---|
| Pittsburgh | Passing | Eli Holstein | 20/35, 302 yards, 3 TD, INT |
| Pittsburgh | Rushing | Desmond Reid | 19 carries, 148 yards |
| Pittsburgh | Receiving | Konata Mumpfield | 5 receptions, 123 yards, 2 TD |
| Cincinnati | Passing | Brendan Sorsby | 22/38, 298 yards, 3 TD |
| Cincinnati | Rushing | Corey Kiner | 20 carries, 149 yards |
| Cincinnati | Receiving | Xzavier Henderson | 5 receptions, 80 yards |

=== West Virginia (Backyard Brawl) ===
Game Three – West Virginia Mountaineers (1–1) at Pittsburgh Panthers (2–0) – Game summary

| Quarter | 1 | 2 | 3 | 4 | Total |
|---|---|---|---|---|---|
| Mountaineers | 7 | 10 | 7 | 10 | 34 |
| Panthers | 10 | 7 | 7 | 14 | 38 |

at Acrisure Stadium, Pittsburgh, Pennsylvania

- Date: September 14
- Game time: 3:30 p.m. EDT
- Game weather: Sunny • Temperature: 85 °F (29 °C) • Wind: E at 9 miles per hour (14 km/h)
- Game attendance: 66,087
- Referee: Michael VanderVelde
- TV announcers (ESPN2): Mike Monaco (play-by-play), Kirk Morrison (analyst), and Dawn Davenport (sideline reporter)

Game information

First quarter

- WVU – CJ Donaldson Jr, 10-yard TD pass from Garrett Greene, Michael Hayes II kick, 7:58 (WVU 7-0)
- PITT – Ben Sauls 31-yard field goal, 6:17 (WVU 7-3)
- PITT – Desmond Reid, 9-yard TD pass from Eli Holstein, Sauls kick, 0:30 (PITT 10-7)

Second quarter

- WVU – Jahiem White, 5-yard TD run, Hayes II kick, 11:54 (WVU 14-10)
- PITT – Desmond Reid, 19-yard TD pass from Holstein, Sauls kick, 7:01 (PITT 17-14)
- WVU – Hayes II, 44-yard field goal, 0:21 (Tied 17-17)

Third quarter

- PITT – Brandon George, 24-yard TD return of blocked punt, Sauls kick, 8:27 (PITT 24-17)
- WVU – Donaldson Jr., 4-yard TD run, Hayes II kick, 4:54 (Tied 24-24)

Fourth quarter

- WVU – Hayes II, 23-yard field goal, 11:19 (WVU 27-24)
- WVU - Justin Robinson, 28-yard TD pass from Greene, Hayes II kick, 4:55 (WVU 34-24)
- PITT – Daejon Reynolds, 40-yard TD pass from Holstein, Sauls kick, 3:06 (WVU 34-31)
- PITT – Derrick Davis Jr., 1-yard TD run, Sauls kick, 0:32 (PITT 38-34)

| Statistics | WVU | PITT |
|---|---|---|
| First downs | 22 | 24 |
| Total yards | 398 | 379 |
| Rushing yards | 188 | 78 |
| Passing yards | 210 | 301 |
| Passing: Comp–Att–Int | 16–30–2 | 21–30–0 |
| Time of possession | 36:17 | 23:43 |

| Team | Category | Player | Statistics |
|---|---|---|---|
| West Virginia | Passing | Garrett Greene | 16/30, 210 yards, 2 TD, 2 INT |
| West Virginia | Rushing | C. J. Donaldson Jr. | 19 carries, 79 yards, TD |
| West Virginia | Receiving | Jaden Bray | 1 reception, 44 yards |
| Pittsburgh | Passing | Eli Holstein | 21/30, 301 yards, 3 TD |
| Pittsburgh | Rushing | Eli Holstein | 14 carries, 59 yards |
| Pittsburgh | Receiving | Kenny Johnson | 5 receptions, 79 yards |

=== Youngstown State (FCS) ===
Game Four – Youngstown State Penguins (FCS) (1–2) at Pittsburgh Panthers (3–0) – Game summary

| Quarter | 1 | 2 | 3 | 4 | Total |
|---|---|---|---|---|---|
| Penguins (FCS) | 0 | 10 | 7 | 0 | 17 |
| Panthers | 21 | 21 | 10 | 21 | 73 |

at Acrisure Stadium, Pittsburgh, Pennsylvania

- Date: September 21
- Game time: 3:30 p.m. EDT
- Game attendance: 48,437
- TV announcers (ACCNX/ESPN+): Doug Sherman (play-by-play) and Forrest Conoly (analyst)
- Box score

Game information

First quarter

- (11:27) PITT – Raphael Williams Jr. 6-yard pass from Eli Holstein, Ben Sauls kick (Drive: 11 plays, 75 yards, 3:33; Pittsburgh 7–0)
- (8:30) PITT – Daniel Carter 24-yard run, Ben Sauls kick (Drive: 2 plays, 42 yards, 0:29; Pittsburgh 14–0)
- (3:33) PITT – Eli Holstein 2-yard run, Ben Sauls kick (Drive: 7 plays, 61 yards, 3:03; Pittsburgh 21–0)

Second quarter

- (12:33) YSU – Andrew Lastovka 46-yard field goal (Drive: 11 plays, 47 yards, 6:00; Pittsburgh 21–3)
- (10:34) PITT – Kenny Johnson 10-yard pass from Eli Holstein, Ben Sauls kick (Drive: 5 plays, 74 yards, 1:54; Pittsburgh 28–3)
- (8:08) PITT – Daniel Carter 43-yard run, Ben Sauls kick (Drive: 2 plays, 43 yards, 0:17; Pittsburgh 35–3)
- (1:52) YSU – Cyrus Traugh 25-yard pass from Beau Brungard, Andrew Lastovka kick (Drive: 11 plays, 75 yards, 6:16; Pittsburgh 35–10)
- (1:34) PITT – Censere Lee 82-yard pass from Eli Holstein, Ben Sauls kick (Drive: 1 play, 82 yards, 0:13; Pittsburgh 42–10)

Third quarter

- (9:23) YSU – Cyrus Traugh 44-yard pass from Beau Brungard, Andrew Lastovka kick (Drive: 2 plays, 47 yards, 0:53; Pittsburgh 42–17)
- (6:52) PITT – Ben Sauls 49-yard field goal (Drive: 7 plays, 37 yards, 2:26; Pittsburgh 45–17)
- (1:32) PITT – Eli Holstein 2-yard run, Ben Sauls kick (Drive: 9 plays, 83 yards, 3:13; Pittsburgh 52–17)

Fourth quarter

- (10:30) PITT – Daniel Carter 13-yard pass from Nate Yarnell, Ben Sauls kick (Drive: 9 plays, 92 yards, 2:55; Pittsburgh 59–17)
- (8:36) PITT – Tamarion Crumpley 22-yard interception return, Ben Sauls kick (Drive: 4 plays, 10 yards, 1:49; Pittsburgh 66–17)
- (3:35) PITT – Che Nwabuko 57-yard run, Sam Carpenter kick (Drive: 6 plays, 85 yards, 2:42; Pittsburgh 73–17)

| Statistics | YSU | PITT |
|---|---|---|
| First downs | 18 | 28 |
| Total yards | 309 | 644 |
| Rushing yards | 71 | 295 |
| Passing yards | 238 | 349 |
| Passing: Comp–Att–Int | 20–31–2 | 24–35–0 |
| Time of possession | 37:29 | 22:31 |

| Team | Category | Player | Statistics |
|---|---|---|---|
| Youngstown State | Passing | Beau Brungard | 18/28, 233 yards, 2 TD, INT |
| Youngstown State | Rushing | Ethan Wright | 7 carries, 35 yards |
| Youngstown State | Receiving | Cyrus Traugh | 4 receptions, 87 yards, 2 TD |
| Pittsburgh | Passing | Eli Holstein | 16/24, 247 yards, 3 TD |
| Pittsburgh | Rushing | Daniel Carter | 7 carries, 109 yards, 2 TD |
| Pittsburgh | Receiving | Censere Lee | 4 receptions, 108 yards, TD |

=== at North Carolina ===
Game Five – Pittsburgh Panthers (4–0) at North Carolina Tar Heels (3–1) – Game summary

| Quarter | 1 | 2 | 3 | 4 | Total |
|---|---|---|---|---|---|
| Panthers | 3 | 14 | 7 | 10 | 34 |
| Tar Heels | 7 | 10 | 7 | 0 | 24 |

at Kenan Memorial Stadium, Chapel Hill, North Carolina

- Date: October 5
- Game time: 12:00 p.m. EDT
- Game weather: Sunny • 78 °F (26 °C) • Wind: N 7 miles per hour (11 km/h)
- Game attendance: 46,003
- Referee: Stuart Mullins
- TV announcers (ESPN2): Roy Philpott (play-by-play), Sam Acho (analyst), and Taylor Davis (sideline reporter)

Game information

First quarter

- (11:36) PITT - Ben Sauls 24 yard field goal (Drive: 9 plays, 59 yards, 3:24) PITT 3–0
- (6:44) UNC - Kaleb Cost 84 yard interception return (Noah Burnette kick) UNC 7–3

Second quarter

- (10:20) PITT - Censere Lee 7 yard pass from Eli Holstein (Ben Sauls kick) (Drive: 5 plays, 91 yards, 1:33) PITT 10–7
- (6:57) UNC - Noah Burnette 34 yard field goal (Drive: 10 plays, 58 yards, 3:23) 10–10
- (5:41) PITT - Raphael Williams Jr. 30 yard pass from Eli Holstein (Ben Sauls kick) (Drive: 5 plays, 75 yards, 1:16)) PITT 17–10
- (0:42) UNC - Omarion Hampton 3 yard rush (Noah Burnette kick) (Drive: 10 plays, 73 yards, 2:09) 17–17

Third quarter

- (8:58) PITT - Desmond Reid 2 yard pass from Eli Holstein (Ben Sauls kick) (Drive: 9 plays, 58 yards, 3:03) PITT 24–17
- (2:07) UNC - John Copenhaver 11 yard pass from Jacolby Criswell (Noah Burnette kick) (Drive: 11 plays, 61 yards, 4:20) 24–24

Fourth quarter

- (12:44) PITT - Eli Holstein 3 yard rush (Ben Sauls kick) (Drive: 11 plays, 75 yards, 4:23) PITT 31–24
- (2:01) PITT - Ben Sauls 37 yard field goal (Drive: 18 plays, 73 yards, 7:07) PITT 34–24

| Statistics | PITT | UNC |
|---|---|---|
| First downs | 23 | 23 |
| Total yards | 520 | 416 |
| Rushing yards | 139 | 147 |
| Passing yards | 381 | 269 |
| Passing: Comp–Att–Int | 25–42–1 | 24–45–0 |
| Time of possession | 29:19 | 30:41 |

| Team | Category | Player | Statistics |
|---|---|---|---|
| Pittsburgh | Passing | Eli Holstein | 25/42, 381 yards, 3 TD, INT |
| Pittsburgh | Rushing | Eli Holstein | 10 carries, 76 yards, TD |
| Pittsburgh | Receiving | Desmond Reid | 11 receptions, 155 yards, TD |
| North Carolina | Passing | Jacolby Criswell | 24/45, 269 yards, TD |
| North Carolina | Rushing | Omarion Hampton | 23 carries, 106 yards, TD |
| North Carolina | Receiving | Nate McCollum | 10 receptions, 128 yards |

=== vs. California ===
Game Six – California Golden Bears (3–2) vs No. 22 Pittsburgh Panthers (5–0) – Game summary

| Quarter | 1 | 2 | 3 | 4 | Total |
|---|---|---|---|---|---|
| Golden Bears | 6 | 3 | 0 | 6 | 15 |
| No. 22 Panthers | 7 | 10 | 0 | 0 | 17 |

at Acrisure Stadium, Pittsburgh, Pennsylvania

- Date: October 12
- Game time: 3:30 p.m. EDT
- Game weather: Temperature: 67 °F (19 °C) • Wind: W at 5 miles per hour (8.0 km/h) • Weather: Cloudy
- Game attendance: 49,773
- Referee: Adam Savoie
- TV announcers (ESPN): Dave Flemming (play-by-play), Brock Osweiler (analyst), and Stormy Buonantony (sideline reporter)

Game information

First quarter

- (8:56) CAL – Jaivian Thomas 21-yard run, 2-point pass conversion failed (Drive: 10 plays, 75 yards, 4:50; California 6–0)
- (5:07) PITT – Desmond Reid 5-yard run, Ben Sauls kick (Drive: 11 plays, 75 yards, 3:48; Pittsburgh 7–6)

Second quarter

- (14:58) PITT – Desmond Reid 72-yard run, Ben Sauls kick (Drive: 4 plays, 81 yards, 1:17; Pittsburgh 14–6)
- (10:04) PITT – Ben Sauls 58-yard field goal (Drive: 6 plays, 54 yards, 1:50; Pittsburgh 17–6)
- (5:57) CAL – Ryan Coe 39-yard field goal (Drive: 9 plays, 54 yards, 4:07; Pittsburgh 17–9)

Third quarter

- No scoring plays

Fourth quarter

- (10:30) CAL – Jack Endries 19-yard pass from Fernando Mendoza, 2-point run conversion failed (Drive: 6 plays, 78 yards, 3:04; Pittsburgh 17–15)

| Statistics | CAL | PITT |
|---|---|---|
| First downs | 23 | 14 |
| Total yards | 335 | 277 |
| Rushing yards | 63 | 144 |
| Passing yards | 272 | 133 |
| Passing: Comp–Att–Int | 27–37–0 | 14–28–2 |
| Time of possession | 38:29 | 21:31 |

| Team | Category | Player | Statistics |
|---|---|---|---|
| California | Passing | Fernando Mendoza | 27/37, 272 yards, TD |
| California | Rushing | Jaivian Thomas | 17 carries, 72 yards, TD |
| California | Receiving | Jack Endries | 8 receptions, 117 yards, TD |
| Pittsburgh | Passing | Eli Holstein | 14/28, 133 yards, 2 INT |
| Pittsburgh | Rushing | Desmond Reid | 16 carries, 120 yards, 2 TD |
| Pittsburgh | Receiving | Konata Mumpfield | 3 receptions, 37 yards |

=== vs. Syracuse (rivalry) ===
Game Seven – Syracuse Orange (5–1) vs No. 19 Pittsburgh Panthers (6–0) – Game summary

| Quarter | 1 | 2 | 3 | 4 | Total |
|---|---|---|---|---|---|
| Orange | 0 | 0 | 6 | 7 | 13 |
| No. 19 Panthers | 17 | 14 | 0 | 10 | 41 |

at Acrisure Stadium, Pittsburgh, Pennsylvania

- Date: October 24
- Game time: 7:30 p.m.
- Game weather: Sunny, 55 °F (13 °C)
- Game attendance: 47,266
- Referee: Tim Hedfepeth
- TV announcers (ESPN): Matt Barrie (play-by-play), Dan Mullen (analyst), and Harry Lyles Jr. (sideline reporter)

Game information

First quarter

- PITT – Rasheem Biles 35-yard interception return (Ben Sauls kick), 12:47. Panthers 7–0.
- PITT – Ben Sauls 49-yard field goal, 8:28. Panthers 10–0. Drive: 6 plays, 13 yards, 2:14.
- PITT – Kyle Louis 59-yard interception return (Ben Sauls kick), 6:23. Panthers 17–0.

Second quarter

- PITT – Censere Lee 20-yard pass from Eli Holstein (Ben Sauls kick), 12:30. Panthers 24–0. Drive: 7 plays, 65 yards, 2:21.
- PITT – Braylan Lovelace 33-yard interception return (Ben Sauks kick), 1:12. Panthers 31–0.

Third quarter

- SYR – Kyle McCord 1-yard run (pass failed), 5:22. Panthers 31–6. Drive: 18 plays, 73 yards, 9:38.

Fourth quarter

- PITT – Raphael Williams Jr. 29-yard pass from Eli Holstein (Ben Sauls kick), 14:54. Panthers 38–6. Drive: 3 plays, 45 yards, 0:52.
- PITT – Ben Sauls 57-yard field goal, 11:13. Panthers 41–6. Drive: 6 plays, 29 yards, 2:37.
- SYR – Dan Villari 2-yard run (Jadyn Oh kick), 7:23. Panthers 41–13. Drive: 11 plays, 75 yards, 3:50.

| Statistics | SYR | PITT |
|---|---|---|
| First downs | 23 | 13 |
| Total yards | 327 | 217 |
| Rushing yards | 6 | 73 |
| Passing yards | 321 | 144 |
| Passing: Comp–Att–Int | 35–64–5 | 16–22–0 |
| Time of possession | 41:12 | 18:48 |

| Team | Category | Player | Statistics |
|---|---|---|---|
| Syracuse | Passing | Kyle McCord | 35/64, 321 yards, 5 INT |
| Syracuse | Rushing | LeQuint Allen | 15 carries, 32 yards |
| Syracuse | Receiving | Emanuel Ross | 5 receptions, 78 yards |
| Pittsburgh | Passing | Eli Holstein | 11/15, 108 yards, 2 TD |
| Pittsburgh | Rushing | Desmond Reid | 11 carries, 47 yards |
| Pittsburgh | Receiving | Raphael Williams Jr. | 2 receptions, 31 yards, TD |

=== at No. 20 SMU ===
Game Eight – No. 18 Pittsburgh Panthers (7–0) at No. 20 SMU Mustangs (7–1) – Game summary

| Quarter | 1 | 2 | 3 | 4 | Total |
|---|---|---|---|---|---|
| No. 18 Panthers | 3 | 0 | 8 | 14 | 25 |
| No. 20 Mustangs | 7 | 24 | 3 | 14 | 48 |

at Gerald J. Ford Stadium, University Park, Texas

- Date: November 2
- Game time: 8:00 p.m. EDT
- Game weather: Cloudy • Temperature: 75 °F (24 °C) • Wind: SE 11 miles per hour (18 km/h)
- Game attendance: 34,648
- Referee: Justin Elliott
- TV announcers (ACCN): Wes Durham (play-by-play), Tom Luginbill (analyst), and Dana Boyle (sideline)

Game information

First quarter

- SMU – LJ Johnson Jr. 2-yard run (Collin Rogers kick), 12:19. Mustangs 7–0. Drive: 7 plays, 75 yards, 2:41.
- PITT – Ben Sauls 44-yard field goal, 5:55. Mustangs 7–3. Drive: 8 plays, 33 yards, 2:25.

Second quarter

- SMU – Roderick Daniels Jr. 3-yard run (Collin Rogers kick), 14:15. Mustangs 14–3. Drive: 15 plays, 75 yards, 6:40.
- SMU – Brashard Smith 71-yard run (Collin Rogers kick), 10:43. Mustangs 21–3. Drive: 1 play, 71 yards, 0:11.
- SMU – Brashard Smith 3-yard pass from Kevin Jennings (Collin Rogers kick), 1:53. Mustangs 28–3. Drive: 7 plays, 46 yards, 2:43.
- SMU – Collin Rogers 50-yard field goal, 0:02. Mustangs 31–3. Drive: 5 plays, 26 yards, 0:45.

Third quarter

- SMU – Collin Rogers 27-yard field goal, 9:39. Mustangs 34–3. Drive: 8 plays, 18 yards, 3:49.
- PITT – Desmond Reid 1-yard run (Eli Holstein rush), 0:36. Mustangs 34–11. Drive: 12 plays, 56 yards, 3:35.

Fourth quarter

- SMU – Brashard Smith 18-yard run (Collin Rogers kick), 10:43. Mustangs 41–11. Drive: 6 plays, 75 yards, 2:50.
- SMU – Matthew Hibner 80-yard pass from Kevin Jennings (Collin Rogers kick), 9:56. Mustangs 48–11. Drive: 1 play, 80 yards, 0:11.
- PITT – Kenny Johnson 13-yard pass from Nate Yarnell (Ben Sauls kick), 4:01. Mustangs 48–18. Drive: 4 plays, 53 yards, 1:23.
- PITT – Malachi Thomas 1-yard pass from Nate Yarnell (Ben Sauls kick), 0:23. Mustangs 48–25. Drive: 7 plays, 70 yards, 1:57.

| Statistics | PITT | SMU |
|---|---|---|
| First downs | 30 | 19 |
| Total yards | 453 | 467 |
| Rushing yards | 103 | 161 |
| Passing yards | 350 | 306 |
| Passing: Comp–Att–Int | 39–58–1 | 18–31–0 |
| Time of possession | 31:44 | 28:16 |

| Team | Category | Player | Statistics |
|---|---|---|---|
| Pittsburgh | Passing | Eli Holstein | 29/47, 248 yards, INT |
| Pittsburgh | Rushing | Desmond Reid | 13 carries, 49 yards, TD |
| Pittsburgh | Receiving | Kenny Johnson | 8 receptions, 81 yards, TD |
| SMU | Passing | Kevin Jennings | 17/25, 306 yards, 2 TD |
| SMU | Rushing | Brashard Smith | 23 carries, 161 yards, 2 TD |
| SMU | Receiving | Matthew Hibner | 3 receptions, 108 yards, TD |

=== vs. Virginia ===
Game Nine – Virginia Cavaliers (4–4) vs No. 18 Pittsburgh Panthers (7–1) – Game summary

| Quarter | 1 | 2 | 3 | 4 | Total |
|---|---|---|---|---|---|
| Cavaliers | 0 | 7 | 14 | 3 | 24 |
| No. 18 Panthers | 0 | 13 | 0 | 6 | 19 |

at Acrisure Stadium, Pittsburgh, Pennsylvania

- Date: November 9
- Game time: 8:00 p.m.
- Game attendance: 56,693
- Referee: Nate Black
- TV announcers (ACCN): Wes Durham (play-by-play), Tom Luginbill (analyst), and Dana Boyle (sideline)

Game information

First quarter

- No scoring plays

Second quarter

- (14:17) UVA – Xavier Brown 1-yard run, Will Bettridge kick (Drive: 6 plays, 78 yards, 2:31; Virginia 7–0)
- (4:48) PITT – Daniel Carter 1-yard run, Ben Sauls kick (Drive: 12 plays, 80 yards, 4:41; Tied 7–7)
- (1:59) PITT – Ben Sauls 44-yard field goal (Drive: 4 plays, -2 yards, 1:31; Pittsburgh 10–7)
- (0:08) PITT – Ben Sauls 48-yard field goal (Drive: 7 plays, 24 yards, 1:11; Pittsburgh 13–7)

Third quarter

- (5:39) UVA – Xavier Brown 24-yard pass from Anthony Colandrea, Will Bettridge kick (Drive: 5 plays, 73 yards, 1:59; Virginia 14–13)
- (3:34) UVA – Kobe Pace 3-yard run, Will Bettridge kick (Drive: 4 plays, 20 yards, 1:48; Virginia 21–13)

Fourth quarter

- (10:32) PITT – Gavin Bartholomew 4-yard pass from Nate Yarnell, 2-point pass conversion failed (Drive: 12 plays, 86 yards, 4:21; Virginia 21–19)
- (2:06) UVA – Will Bettridge 32-yard field goal (Drive: 16 plays, 60 yards, 8:26; Virginia 24–19)

| Statistics | UVA | PITT |
|---|---|---|
| First downs | 19 | 17 |
| Total yards | 340 | 292 |
| Rushing yards | 170 | 127 |
| Passing yards | 170 | 165 |
| Passing: Comp–Att–Int | 17–25–2 | 14–35–2 |
| Time of possession | 35:17 | 24:43 |

| Team | Category | Player | Statistics |
|---|---|---|---|
| Virginia | Passing | Anthony Colandrea | 16/24, 143 yards, TD, 2 INT |
| Virginia | Rushing | Xavier Brown | 15 carries, 68 yards, TD |
| Virginia | Receiving | Chris Tyree | 4 receptions, 42 yards |
| Pittsburgh | Passing | Eli Holstein | 10/23, 121 yards |
| Pittsburgh | Rushing | Desmond Reid | 16 carries, 80 yards |
| Pittsburgh | Receiving | Desmond Reid | 2 receptions, 43 yards |

=== vs. No. 20 Clemson ===
Game Ten – No. 20 Clemson Tigers (7–2) vs Pittsburgh Panthers (7–2) – Game summary

| Quarter | 1 | 2 | 3 | 4 | Total |
|---|---|---|---|---|---|
| No. 20 Tigers | 7 | 10 | 0 | 7 | 24 |
| Panthers | 7 | 0 | 0 | 13 | 20 |

at Acrisure Stadium, Pittsburgh, Pennsylvania

- Date: November 16
- Game time: 12:00 p.m.
- Game weather: Temperature: 49 °F (9 °C) • Wind: NW 9 mph • Weather: Cloudy
- Game attendance: 58,667
- Referee: Stuart Mullins
- TV announcers (ESPN): Sean McDonough (play-by-play), Greg McElroy (analyst), and Molly McGrath (sideline reporter)

Game information

First quarter

- (07:20) Clemson – Antonio Williams 14-yard pass from Cade Klubnik, Nolan Hauser kick (Drive: 8 plays, 93 yards, 3:39; Clemson 7–0)
- (05:22) Pittsburgh – Daniel Carter 2 yard rush, Ben Sauls kick (Drive: 5 plays, 75 yards, 1:58; Tied 7–7)

Second quarter

- (11:18) Clemson – Williams 28-yard pass from Klubnik, Hauser kick (Drive: 3 plays, 75 yards, 1:07; Clemson 14–7)
- (00:03) Clemson – Hauser 51 yard field goal (Drive: 9 plays, 39 yards, 0:45; Clemson 17–7)

Third quarter

No scoring plays

Fourth quarter

- (10:55) Pittsburgh – Sauls 35 yard field goal (Drive: 17 plays, 68 yards, 8:32; Clemson 17–10)
- (07:05) Pittsburgh – Gavin Bartholomew 8-yard pass from Nate Yarnell, Sauls kick (Drive: 7 plays, 58 yards, 3:22; Tied 17–17)
- (01:36) Pittsburgh – Sauls 47 yard field goal (Drive: 8 plays, 26 yards, 2:41; Pittsburgh 20–17)
- (01:16) Clemson – Klubnik 50 yard rush, Hauser kick (Drive: 3 plays, 75 yards, 0:20; Clemson 24–20)

| Statistics | CLEM | PITT |
|---|---|---|
| First downs | 21 | 27 |
| Total yards | 346 | 438 |
| Rushing yards | 58 | 88 |
| Passing yards | 288 | 350 |
| Passing: Comp–Att–Int | 27–43–0 | 34–54–1 |
| Time of possession | 25:54 | 34:06 |

| Team | Category | Player | Statistics |
|---|---|---|---|
| Clemson | Passing | Cade Klubnik | 27/41, 288 yards, 2 TD |
| Clemson | Rushing | Cade Klubnik | 10 carries, 41 yards, TD |
| Clemson | Receiving | Antonio Williams | 13 receptions, 149 yards, 2 TD |
| Pittsburgh | Passing | Nate Yarnell | 34/54, 350 yards, TD, INT |
| Pittsburgh | Rushing | Desmond Reid | 14 carries, 68 yards |
| Pittsburgh | Receiving | Desmond Reid | 10 receptions, 108 yards |

=== at Louisville ===
Game Eleven – Pittsburgh Panthers (7–3) at Louisville Cardinals (6–4) – Game summary

| Quarter | 1 | 2 | 3 | 4 | Total |
|---|---|---|---|---|---|
| Panthers | 0 | 0 | 7 | 2 | 9 |
| Cardinals | 10 | 17 | 10 | 0 | 37 |

at L&N Federal Credit Union Stadium, Louisville, Kentucky

- Date: November 23
- Game time: 4:00 p.m.
- Game weather: Cloudy • Temperature: 43 °F (6 °C) • Wind: SW 7 mph
- Game attendance: 49,441
- TV announcers (ESPN2): Mike Couzens (play-by-play), Brock Osweiler (analyst), and Stormy Buonantony (sideline reporter)

Game information

First quarter

- (6:35) LOU – Brock Travelstead 41-yard field goal (Drive: 10 plays, 57 yards, 5:19; Louisville 3–0)
- (1:54) LOU – Isaac Brown 1-yard run (Brock Travelstead kick) (Drive: 5 plays, 82 yards, 2:18; Louisville 10–0)

Second quarter

- (12:33) LOU – Ja'Corey Brooks 15-yard pass from Tyler Shough (Brock Travelstead kick) (Drive: 6 plays, 50 yards, 2:22; Louisville 17–0)
- (3:58) LOU – Isaac Brown 15-yard run (Brock Travelstead kick) (Drive: 1 plays, 15 yards, 0:08; Louisville 24–0)
- (0:05) LOU – Brock Travelstead 36-yard field goal (Drive: 10 plays, 42 yards, 2:03; Louisville 27–0)

Third quarter

- (13:58) LOU – Chris Bell 68-yard pass from Tyler Shough (Brock Travelstead kick) (Drive: 3 plays, 75 yards, 1:02; Louisville 34–0)
- (3:58) PITT – Konata Mumpfield 8-yard pass from Nate Yarnell (Ben Sauls kick) (Drive: 8 plays, 75 yards, 2:37; Louisville 34–7)
- (0:24) LOU – Brock Travelstead 40-yard field goal (Drive: 8 plays, 37 yards, 3:34; Louisville 37–7)

Fourth quarter

- (12:32) PITT – Team safety (Louisville 37–9)

| Statistics | PITT | LOU |
|---|---|---|
| First downs | 17 | 26 |
| Total yards | 265 | 505 |
| Rushing yards | 75 | 212 |
| Passing yards | 190 | 293 |
| Passing: Comp–Att–Int | 19–35–3 | 17–28–0 |
| Time of possession | 25:34 | 34:26 |

| Team | Category | Player | Statistics |
|---|---|---|---|
| Pittsburgh | Passing | Nate Yarnell | 11–23, 96 yards, TD, INT |
| Pittsburgh | Rushing | Desmond Reid | 19 carries, 59 yards |
| Pittsburgh | Receiving | Konata Mumpfield | 4 receptions, 51 yards, TD |
| Louisville | Passing | Tyler Shough | 17–28, 293 yards, 2 TD |
| Louisville | Rushing | Isaac Brown | 13 carries, 93 yards, 2 TD |
| Louisville | Receiving | Chris Bell | 2 receptions, 101 yards, TD |

=== at Boston College ===
Game Twelve – Pittsburgh Panthers (7–4) at Boston College Eagles (6–5) – Game summary

| Quarter | 1 | 2 | 3 | 4 | Total |
|---|---|---|---|---|---|
| Panthers | 0 | 10 | 7 | 6 | 23 |
| Eagles | 6 | 14 | 7 | 7 | 34 |

at Alumni Stadium, Chestnut Hill, Massachusetts

- Date: November 30
- Game time: 3:00 p.m.
- Game attendance: 29,704
- TV announcers (The CW): Thom Brennaman (play-by-play), Max Browne (analyst) and Treavor Scales (sideline)

Game information

First quarter

- (1:53) BC – Jordan McDonald 36-yard run (2-point pass conversion failed) (Drive: 3 plays, 67 yards, 1:19; Boston College 6–0)

Second quarter

- (6:35) BC – Kye Robichaux 2-yard run (Liam Connor kick) (Drive: 3 plays, 56 yards, 1:32; Boston College 13–0)
- (3:56) PITT – Gavin Bartholomew 11-yard pass from Nate Yarnell (Ben Sauls kick) (Drive: 8 plays, 75 yards, 2:39; Boston College 13–7)
- (0:33) BC – Ty Clemons 55-yard interception return (Liam Connor kick) (Drive: 7 plays, 54 yards, 1:05; Boston College 20–7)
- (0:00) PITT – Ben Sauls 57-yard field goal (Drive: 3 plays, 6 yards, 0:33; Boston College 20–10)

Third quarter

- (7:50) PITT – Gavin Bartholomew 5-yard pass from Nate Yarnell (Ben Sauls kick) (Drive: 8 plays, 65 yards, 3:20; Boston College 20–17)
- (2:33) BC – Reed Harris 28-yard pass from Grayson James (Liam Connor kick) (Drive: 8 plays, 83 yards, 5:17; Boston College 27–17)

Fourth quarter

- (6:12) BC – Kamari Morales 15-yard pass from Grayson James (Liam Connor kick) (Drive: 8 plays, 39 yards, 4:57; Boston College 34–17)
- (12:32) PITT – Konata Mumpfield 15-yard pass from Nate Yarnell (2-point pass conversion failed) (Drive: 9 plays, 75 yards, 2:13; Boston College 34–23)

| Statistics | PITT | BC |
|---|---|---|
| First downs | 22 | 18 |
| Total yards | 322 | 381 |
| Rushing yards | 23 | 128 |
| Passing yards | 299 | 253 |
| Passing: Comp–Att–Int | 24–44–1 | 20–28–0 |
| Time of possession | 24:08 | 35:52 |

| Team | Category | Player | Statistics |
|---|---|---|---|
| Pittsburgh | Passing | Nate Yarnell | 23/42, 296 yards, 3 TD, INT |
| Pittsburgh | Rushing | Derrick Davis Jr. | 5 carries, 21 yards |
| Pittsburgh | Receiving | Konata Mumpfield | 8 receptions, 144 yards, TD |
| Boston College | Passing | Grayson James | 20/28, 253 yards, 2 TD |
| Boston College | Rushing | Kye Robichaux | 21 carries, 71 yards, TD |
| Boston College | Receiving | Reed Harris | 3 receptions, 85 yards, TD |

=== vs. Toledo (GameAbove Sports Bowl) ===
2024 GameAbove Sports Bowl
Pittsburgh Panthers (7–5) vs Toledo Rockets (7–5) – Game summary

| Quarter | 1 | 2 | 3 | 4 | OT | 2OT | 3OT | 4OT | 5OT | 6OT | Total |
|---|---|---|---|---|---|---|---|---|---|---|---|
| Panthers | 2 | 10 | 11 | 7 | 7 | 3 | 2 | 2 | 2 | 0 | 46 |
| Rockets | 6 | 14 | 0 | 10 | 7 | 3 | 2 | 2 | 2 | 2 | 48 |

at Ford Field • Detroit, Michigan

- Date: Thursday, December 26, 2024
- Game time: 2:00 p.m. EST
- Game weather: Indoor
- Game attendance: 26,219
- Referee: Ron Hudson
- TV announcers (ESPN): Matt Schumacker (play-by-play), Dustin Fox (analyst), and Harry Lyles Jr. (sideline)

Game information

First Quarter

- (11:42) UT – Anthony Torres 2 yard pass from Tucker Gleason, PAT kick blocked (Drive: 8 plays, 75 yards, 3:18; Toledo 6–0)
- (11:42) PITT – Kyle Lewis defensive PAT conversion (Drive: 8 plays, 75 yards, 3:18; Toledo 6–2)

Second Quarter

- (14:56) PITT – Desmond Reid 3 yard run, Ben Sauls kick (Drive: 11 plays, 79 yards, 4:35; Pittsburgh 9–6)
- (11:12) PITT – Ben Sauls 57 yard field goal (Drive: 7 plays, 31 yards, 2:51; Pittsburgh 12–6)
- (7:38) UT – Junior Vandeross III 67 yard pass from Tucker Gleason, Dylan Cunanan kick (Drive: 4 plays, 93 yards, 1:06; Toledo 13–12)
- (7:24) UT – Braden Awls 42 yard interception return, Dylan Cunanan kick (Drive: 1 plays, 0 yards, 0:14; Toledo 20-12)

Third Quarter

- (6:55) PITT – Jake Overman 11 yard pass from Julian Dugger, David Lynch pass to Gavin Bartholomew for 2-Point Conversion (Drive: 10 plays, 71 yards, 3:47; Tie 20–20)
- (3:23) PITT – Ben Sauls 37 yard field goal (Drive: 7 plays, 37 yards, 3:18; Pittsburgh 23–20)

Fourth Quarter

- (13:11) PITT – Raphael Williams Jr. 16 yard pass from Julian Dugger, Ben Sauls kick (Drive: 6 plays, 34 yards, 3:04; Pittsburgh 30–20)
- (7:49) UT – Darius Alexander 58 yard interception return, Dylan Cunanan kick (Drive: 7 plays, 32 yards, 3:33; Pittsburgh 30–27)
- (1:45) UT – Dylan Cunanan 51 yard field goal (Drive: 10 plays, 47 yards, 2:54; Tie 30–30)

Overtime

- PITT – Julian Dugger 2 yard run, Ben Sauls kick (Drive: 6 plays, 25 yards; Pittsburgh 37–30)
- UT – Tucker Gleason 1 yard run, Dylan Cunanan kick (Drive: 8 plays, 25 yards; Tie 37–37)

Second Overtime

- UT – Dylan Cunanan 33 yard field goal (Drive: 6 plays, 10 yards; Toledo 40–37)
- PITT – Ben Sauls 19 yard field goal (Drive: 8 plays, 24 yards; Tie 40-40)

Third Overtime

- PITT – Julian Dugger pass to Kenny Johnson for 2-Point Conversion (Drive: 0 plays, 0 yards; Pittsburgh 42–40)
- UT – Tucker Gleason Pass to Terrell Crosby Jr. for 2-Point Conversion (Drive: 0 plays, 0 yards; Tie 42–42)

Fourth Overtime

- UT – Tucker Gleason Pass to Anthony Torres for 2-Point Conversion (Drive: 0 plays, 0 yards; Toledo 44–42)
- PITT – Julian Dugger run for 2-Point Conversion (Drive: 0 plays, 0 yards; Tie 44–44)

Fifth Overtime

- PITT – Julian Dugger pass to Gavin Bartholomew for 2-Point Conversion (Drive: 0 plays, 0 yards; Pittsburgh 46–44)
- UT – Tucker Gleason Pass to Jerjuan Newton for 2-Point Conversion (Drive: 0 plays, 0 yards; Tie 46–46)

Sixth Overtime

- UT – Tucker Gleason Pass to Junior Vandeross III for 2-Point Conversion (Drive: 0 plays, 0 yards; Toledo 48–46)

| Statistics | PITT | TOL |
|---|---|---|
| First downs | 29 | 18 |
| Total yards | 438 | 416 |
| Rushing yards | 301 | 80 |
| Passing yards | 137 | 336 |
| Passing: Comp–Att–Int | 17–32–3 | 26–50–1 |
| Time of possession | 36:12 | 23:48 |

| Team | Category | Player | Statistics |
|---|---|---|---|
| Pittsburgh | Passing | Julian Dugger | 7/13, 72 yards, 2 TD, INT |
| Pittsburgh | Rushing | Desmond Reid | 33 carries, 169 yards, TD |
| Pittsburgh | Receiving | Raphael Williams Jr. | 3 receptions, 36 yards, TD |
| Toledo | Passing | Tucker Gleason | 26/50, 336 yards, 2 TD, INT |
| Toledo | Rushing | Jacquez Stuart | 7 carries, 39 yards |
| Toledo | Receiving | Junior Vandeross III | 12 receptions, 194 yards, TD |

== Coaching staff ==
Pittsburgh Panthers
| Name | Position | Consecutive season at Pittsburgh in current position | Previous position | Pitt profile |
| Pat Narduzzi | Head coach | 10th | Michigan State defensive coordinator (2007–2014) | |
| Cory Sanders | Assistant head coach and safeties coach | 1st | Pittsburgh safeties coach (2018–2023) | |
| Kade Bell | Offensive coordinator and quarterbacks coach | 1st | Western Carolina offensive coordinator and quarterbacks coach (2021–2023) | |
| Randy Bates | Defensive coordinator | 7th | Northwestern linebackers coach (2006–2017) | |
| Jacob Bronowski | Special teams coordinator and tight ends coach | 1st | Miami (OH) special teams coordinator and defensive assistant (2022–2023) | |
| Archie Collins | Secondary coach | 7th | Central Michigan defensive pass game coordinator and secondary coach (2017) | |
| Tim Daoust | Defensive line coach | 1st | East Carolina special teams coordinator, outside linebackers coach, and defensive ends coach (2021–2023) | |
| Jeremy Darveau | Offensive line coach | 1st | Western Carolina offensive line coach (2022–2023) | |
| Lindsey Lamar | Running backs coach | 1st | Howard offensive coordinator and wide receivers coach (2023) | |
| JJ Laster | Wide receivers coach | 1st | Western Carolina wide receivers coach (2021–2023) | |
| Ryan Manalac | Linebackers coach | 4th | Bucknell defensive coordinator and linebackers coach (2019–2020) | |
| Trent Turknett | Offensive quality control coach | 1st | Western Carolina director of player personnel (2021–2023) | |
| Jacob Floyd | Offensive graduate assistant | 1st | Sewanee running backs coach and tight ends coach (2023) | |
| Chris Russell | Offensive graduate assistant | 1st | Pittsburgh volunteer coach (2023) | |
| Malcolm Robinson | Defensive graduate assistant | 2nd | Akron defensive quality control coach (2022) | |
| Edward Warinner | Defensive graduate assistant | 2nd | Miami (OH) defensive graduate assistant (2022) | |

== Rankings ==
Ranking movements Legend: ██ Increase in ranking ██ Decrease in ranking — = Not ranked RV = Received votes
| | Week | | | | | | | | | | | | | | | | |
| Poll | Pre | 1 | 2 | 3 | 4 | 5 | 6 | 7 | 8 | 9 | 10 | 11 | 12 | 13 | 14 | 15 | Final |
|---|---|---|---|---|---|---|---|---|---|---|---|---|---|---|---|---|---|
| AP | — | — | — | RV | RV | RV | 22 | 20 | 19 | 18 | 23 | RV | RV | — | — | — | — |
| Coaches | — | — | RV | RV | RV | RV | 24 | 20 | 20 | 17 | 23 | RV | RV | — | — | — | — |
| CFP | Not released | | | | | | | | | | 18 | — | — | — | — | — | Not released |
