= 2024 Toledo Rockets football team =

American college football season

2024 Toledo Rockets football

GameAbove Sports Bowl champion

GameAbove Sports Bowl, W 48–46 ^{6OT} vs. Pittsburgh
- Conference: Mid-American Conference
- Record: 8–5 (4–4 MAC)
- Head coach: Jason Candle (9th season)
- Co-offensive coordinators: Mike Hallett (5th season); Robert Weiner (5th season)
- Offensive scheme: Spread
- Defensive coordinator: Vince Kehres (5th season)
- Co-defensive coordinator: Ross Watson (5th season)
- Base defense: 4–2–5
- Home stadium: Glass Bowl

2024 Mid-American Conference football standings
	Conf.			Overall
Team	W		L	W		L
Ohio y$	7	–	1	11	–	3
Miami (OH) y	7	–	1	9	–	5
Buffalo	6	–	2	9	–	4
Bowling Green	6	–	2	7	–	6
Western Michigan	5	–	3	6	–	7
Toledo	4	–	4	8	–	5
Northern Illinois	4	–	4	8	–	5
Akron	3	–	5	4	–	8
Eastern Michigan	2	–	6	5	–	7
Central Michigan	2	–	6	4	–	8
Ball State	2	–	6	3	–	9
Kent State	0	–	8	0	–	12
Championship: Ohio 38, Miami (OH) 3
$ – Conference champion; y – Championship game participant

The 2024 Toledo Rockets football team represented the University of Toledo in the Mid-American Conference during the 2024 NCAA Division I FBS football season. The Rockets were led by Jason Candle in his ninth year as the head coach. The Rockets played home games at the Glass Bowl, located in Toledo, Ohio. In week 3, the Rockets pulled off a 41–17 upset victory over Mississippi State from the SEC with a payout of $1.2 million.

== Preseason ==
=== Preseason poll ===
On July 19 the MAC announced the preseason coaches poll. Toledo was picked to finish second in the conference. The Rockets received two votes to win the MAC Championship.

== Schedule ==
Date	Time	Opponent	Site	TV	Result	Attendance
August 29	7:30 p.m.	Duquesne*	Glass Bowl; Toledo, OH	ESPN+	W 49–10	23,515
September 7	3:30 p.m.	UMass*	Glass Bowl; Toledo, OH	ESPN+	W 38–23	21,668
September 14	7:30 p.m.	at Mississippi State*	Davis Wade Stadium; Starkville, MS	ESPNU	W 41–17	47,412
September 21	7:00 p.m.	at Western Kentucky*	Houchens Industries–L. T. Smith Stadium; Bowling Green, KY	ESPN+	L 21–26	19,127
October 5	3:30 p.m.	Miami (OH)^{†}	Glass Bowl; Toledo, OH	ESPN+	W 30–20	25,027
October 12	12:00 p.m.	at Buffalo	University at Buffalo Stadium; Amherst, NY	ESPNU	L 15–30	13,996
October 19	3:30 p.m.	at Northern Illinois	Huskie Stadium; DeKalb, IL	ESPN+	W 13–6	18,350
October 26	3:30 p.m.	Bowling Green	Glass Bowl; Toledo, OH (rivalry)	ESPN+	L 26–41	29,697
November 2	12:00 p.m.	at Eastern Michigan	Rynearson Stadium; Ypsilanti, MI	ESPNU	W 29–28	13,044
November 12	7:00 p.m.	Central Michigan	Glass Bowl; Toledo, OH	ESPNU	W 37–10	14,661
November 20	7:00 p.m.	Ohio	Glass Bowl; Toledo, OH	ESPN2	L 7–24	14,543
November 26	7:00 p.m.	at Akron	InfoCision Stadium; Akron, OH	ESPN2	L 14–21 ^{OT}	4,716
December 26	2:00 p.m.	vs. Pittsburgh*	Ford Field; Detroit, MI (GameAbove Sports Bowl)	ESPN	W 48–46 ^{6OT}	26,219
*Non-conference game; ^{†}Homecoming; All times are in Eastern time

== Game summaries ==
=== vs. Duquesne ===
Duquesne Dukes (FCS) (0–0) at Toledo Rockets (0–0) – Game summary

Quarter	1	2	3	4	Total
Dukes (FCS)	7	3	0	0	10
Rockets	21	7	14	7	49

at Glass Bowl, Toledo, OH

- Date: August 29
- Game time: 7:30 PM
- Game weather: 78 °F (26 °C), Wind: 8 mph E, Sunny
- Game attendance: 23,515
- Referee: Aaron Adams
- TV announcers (ESPN+): Michael Reghi (play-by-play), Marcus Ray (analyst)

Game information

First quarter

- (11:48) TOL TD: Junior Vandeross III 9-yard pass from Tucker Gleason (Dylan Cunanan kick) TOL 7–0; 9 plays, 65 yards, 3:12
- (04:31) TOL TD: Jacquez 8-yard run (Dylan Cunanan kick) TOL 14–0; 7 plays, 57 yards, 2:24
- (01:20) DUQ TD: Noah Canty 4-yard pass from Darius Perrantes (Brian Bruzdewicz kick) TOL 14–7; 6 plays, 75 yards, 3:11
- (01:02) TOL TD: Jerjuan Newton 54-yard pass from Tucker Gleason (Dylan Cunanan kick) TOL 21–7; 1 plays, 54 yards, 00:12

Second quarter

- (08:51) DUQ FG: Brian Bruzdewicz 22-yard field goal TOL 21–10; 13 plays, 82 yards, 7:03
- (01:59) TOL TD: Anthony Torres 14-yard pass from Tucker Gleason (Dylan Cunanan kick) TOL 28–10; 5 plays, 29 yards, 2:16

Third quarter

- (11:49) TOL TD: Jacquez Stuart 1-yard run (Dylan Cunanan kick) TOL 35–10; 7 plays, 38 yards, 3:01
- (00:14) TOL TD: Willie Shaw III 10-yard run (Dylan Cunanan kick) TOL 42–10; 2 plays, 21 yards, 00:35

Fourth quarter

- (07:41) TOL TD: Zy'marion Lang 18-yard pass from John Alan Richter (Spencer Conrad kick) TOL 49–10; 8 plays, 80 yards, 4:03

Statistics	DUQ	TOL
First downs	15	27
Total yards	284	446
Rushing yards	123	166
Passing yards	161	280
Passing: Comp–Att–Int	17–29–1	21–30–0
Time of possession	31:04	28:56

Team	Category	Player	Statistics
Duquesne	Passing	Darius Perrantes	15/26, 143 yards, 1 TD, 1 INT
Duquesne	Rushing	Taj Butts	5 carries, 39 yards
Duquesne	Receiving	John Erby	7 receptions, 69 yards
Toledo	Passing	Tucker Gleason	15/24, 202 yards, 3 TD
Toledo	Rushing	Willie Shaw III	7 carries, 50 yards, 1 TD
Toledo	Receiving	Jerjuan Newton	5 receptions, 98 yards, 1 TD

=== vs. UMass ===
UMass Minutemen (0–1) at Toledo Rockets (1–0) – Game summary

Quarter	1	2	3	4	Total
Minutemen	0	13	3	7	23
Rockets	7	10	7	14	38

at Glass Bowl, Toledo, OH

- Date: September 7
- Game time: 7:30 PM
- Game weather: 61 °F (16 °C), Wind: 10 mph NW, Cloudy
- Game attendance: 21,668
- Referee: Greg Sujack
- TV announcers (ESPN+): Michael Reghi (play-by-play), Je'Rod Cherry (analyst)

Game information

First quarter

- (03:19) TOL TD: Jerjuan Newton 40-yard pass from Tucker Gleason (Dylan Cunanan kick) TOL 7–0; 4 plays, 67 yards, 1:38

Second quarter

- (11:52) MAS FG: Jacob Lurie 23-yard field goal TOL 7–3; 10 plays, 86 yards, 6:22
- (09:09) TOL FG: Dylan Cunanan 26-yard field goal TOL 10–3; 8 plays, 67 yards, 2:43
- (02:32) MASS TD: Jakobie Keeney-James 14-yard pass from Taisun Phommachanh (Jacob Lurie kick) Tied 10–10; 11 plays, 75 yards, 6:27
- (02:32) TOL TD: Jacquez Stuart 98-yard kickoff return (Dylan Cunanan kick) TOL 17–10
- (00:01) MAS FG: Jacob Lurie 42-yard field goal TOL 17–13; 10 plays, 41 yards, 2:32

Third quarter

- (06:44) MAS FG: Jacob Lurie 30-yard field goal TOL 17–16; 17 plays, 59 yards, 7:17
- (04:08) TOL TD: Junior Vandeross III 73-yard pass from Tucker Gleason (Dylan Cunanan kick) TOL 24–16; 1 plays, 73 yards, 00:11

Fourth quarter

- (02:56) TOL TD: Willie Shaw III 4-yard run (Dylan Cunanan kick) TOL 31–16; 4 plays, 55 yards, 1:47
- (02:56) MAS TD: Taisun Phommachanh 8-yard run (Jacob Lurie kick) TOL 31–23; 10 plays, 73 yards, 5:01
- (02:26) TOL TD: Anthony Torres 7-yard pass from Tucker Gleason (Dylan Cunanan kick) TOL 38–23; 4 plays, 25 yards, 00:29

Statistics	MASS	TOL
First downs	23	12
Total yards	384	258
Rushing yards	125	83
Passing yards	259	175
Passing: Comp–Att–Int	26–40–1	8–23–0
Time of possession	44:21	15:39

Team	Category	Player	Statistics
UMass	Passing	Taisun Phommachanh	26/40, 259 yards, 1 TD, 1 INT
UMass	Rushing	Taisun Phommachanh	22 carries, 44 yards, 1 TD
UMass	Receiving	Jakobie Keeney-James	6 receptions, 93 yards, 1 TD
Toledo	Passing	Tucker Gleason	8/23, 175 yards, 3 TD
Toledo	Rushing	Tucker Gleason	3 carries, 34 yards
Toledo	Receiving	Junior Vandeross III	3 receptions, 115 yards, 1 TD

=== at Mississippi State ===
Toledo Rockets (2–0) at Mississippi State Bulldogs (1–1) – Game summary

Quarter	1	2	3	4	Total
Rockets	7	21	7	6	41
Bulldogs	0	3	7	7	17

at Davis Wade Stadium, Starkville, MS

- Date: September 14
- Game time: 7:00 PM
- Game weather: 75 °F (24 °C), Wind: 3 mph NE, Sunny
- Game attendance: 47,412
- TV announcers (ESPNU): Jay Alter (play-by-play), Rocky Boiman (analyst)

Game information

First quarter

- (06:35) TOL TD: Junior Vandeross III 4-yard pass from Tucker Gleason (Dylan Cunanan kick) TOL 7–0; 12 plays, 70 yards, 6:13

Second quarter

- (13:26) TOL TD: Jerjuan Newton 6-yard pass from Tucker Gleason (Dylan Cunanan kick) TOL 14–0; 6 plays, 61 yards, 1:54
- (09:35) MSST FG: Kyle Ferrie 23-yard field goal TOL 14–3; 12 plays, 64 yards, 3:43
- (05:09) TOL TD: Connor Walendzak 1-yard run (Dylan Cunanan kick) TOL 21–3; 10 plays, 75 yards, 4:26
- (01:09) TOL TD: Willie Shaw III 10-yard run (Dylan Cunanan kick) TOL 28–3; 9 plays, 78 yards, 2:22

Third quarter

- (10:05) TOL TD: Jerjuan Newton 15-yard pass from Tucker Gleason (Dylan Cunanan kick) TOL 35–3; 4 plays, 37 yards, 1:56
- (05:40) MSST TD: Mario Craver 9-yard pass from Blake Shapen (Kyle Ferrie kick) TOL 35–10; 13 plays, 72 yards, 4:18

Fourth quarter

- (12:20) TOL FG: Dylan Cunanan 41-yard field goal TOL 38–10; 14 plays, 52 yards, 8:20
- (06:11) MSST TD: Kevin Coleman Jr. 1-yard pass from Blake Shapen (Kyle Ferrie kick) TOL 38–17; 11 plays, 80 yards, 3:39
- (01:11) TOL FG: Dylan Cunanan 23-yard field goal TOL 41–17; 8 plays, 44 yards, 4:58

Statistics	TOL	MSST
First downs	26	21
Total yards	454	385
Rushing yards	169	66
Passing yards	285	319
Passing: Comp–Att–Int	23–28–0	28–39–1
Time of possession	37:04	22:56

Team	Category	Player	Statistics
Toledo	Passing	Tucker Gleason	23/28, 285 yards, 3 TD
Toledo	Rushing	Willie Shaw III	16 carries, 62 yards, 1 TD
Toledo	Receiving	Junior Vandeross III	7 receptions, 73 yards, 1 TD
Mississippi State	Passing	Blake Shapen	28/39, 319 yards, 2 TD, 1 INT
Mississippi State	Rushing	Johnnie Daniels	10 carries, 59 yards
Mississippi State	Receiving	Kevin Coleman Jr.	7 receptions, 77 yards, 1 TD

=== at Western Kentucky ===
Toledo Rockets (3–0) at Western Kentucky Hilltoppers (2–1) – Game summary

Quarter	1	2	3	4	Total
Rockets	0	14	7	0	21
Hilltoppers	0	7	5	14	26

at Houchens Industries–L. T. Smith Stadium, Bowling Green, KY

- Date: September 21
- Game time: 7:00 PM
- Game weather: Sunny
- Game attendance: 19,127
- Referee: Rodney Burnette
- TV announcers (ESPN+): Jeff Hem (play-by-play) and Terry Obee (analyst)

Game information

First quarter

- No scoring

Second quarter

- (13:18) TOL TD: Tucker Gleason 1-yd run (Dylan Cunanan kick) TOL 7–0; 10 plays, 63 yards, 5:33
- (2:30) TOL TD: Anthony Torres 14-yd pass from Tucker Gleason (Dylan Cunanan kick) TOL 14–0; 9 plays, 43 yards, 4:55
- (1:53) WKU TD: Kisean Johnson 44-yd pass from Caden Veltkamp (Lucas Carneiro kick) TOL 14–7; 2 plays, 63 yards, 0:29

Third quarter

- (13:02) WKU FG: Lucas Carneiro 39-yd field goal TOL 14–10; 4 plays, 1 yard, 1:53
- (8:13) TOL TD: Anthony Torres 7-yd pass from Tucker Gleason (Dylan Cunanan kick) TOL 21–10; 12 plays, 80 yards, 4:42
- (0:39) WKU SF: Devon Lynch safety TOL 21-12; 1 play, -2 yards, 0:14

Fourth quarter

- (10:43) WKU TD: Caden Veltkamp 7-yd run (Lucas Carneiro kick) TOL 21–19; 3 plays, 49 yards, 0:47
- (5:16) WKU TD: Caden Veltkamp 3-yd run (Lucas Carneiro kick) WKU 26–21; 9 plays, 65 yards, 4:25

Statistics	TOL	WKU
First downs	17	16
Total yards	325	313
Rushing yards	125	71
Passing yards	200	242
Passing: Comp–Att–Int	19–33-2	20-30-2
Time of possession	34:19	25:41

Team	Category	Player	Statistics
Toledo	Passing	Tucker Gleason	19/33, 200 yards, 2 TD, 2 INT
Toledo	Rushing	Tucker Gleason	12 carries, 46 yds, 1 TD
Toledo	Receiving	Jacquez Stuart	3 receptions, 93 yards
Western Kentucky	Passing	Caden Veltkamp	20/30, 242 yards, 1 TD, 2 INT
Western Kentucky	Rushing	Elijah Young	9 carries, 36 yds
Western Kentucky	Receiving	Kisean Johnson	6 receptions, 73 yds, 1 TD

=== vs. Miami (OH) ===
Miami RedHawks (1–3) vs Toledo Rockets (3–1) – Game summary

Quarter	1	2	3	4	Total
RedHawks	3	3	7	7	20
Rockets	14	6	3	7	30

at Glass Bowl, Toledo, OH

- Date: October 5
- Game time: 3:30 p.m.
- Game weather: Sunny • Temperature: 71 °F (22 °C) • Wind: SE at 8 miles per hour (13 km/h)
- Game attendance: 25,027
- Referee: David Siegle
- TV announcers (ESPN+): Michael Reghi (play-by-play), and Marcus Ray (analyst)

Game information

First quarter

- (07:50) TOL TD: Tucker Gleason 1-yard run (Dylan Cunanan kick) TOL 7–0; 9 plays, 37 yards, 3:41
- (05:56) TOL TD: Jerjuan Newton 6-yard pass from Tucker Gleason (Dylan Cunanan kick) TOL 14–0; 3 plays, 18 yards, 00:55
- (1:00) MIA FG: Dom Dzioban 26-yard field goal TOL 14–3; 11 plays, 68 yards, 4:52

Second quarter

- (05:52) TOL FG: Dylan Cunanan 21-yard field goal TOL 17–3; 10 plays, 62 yards, 4:48
- (1:00) MIA FG: Dom Dzioban 35-yard field goal TOL 17–6; 7 plays, 64 yards, 3:10
- (00:03) TOL FG: Dylan Cunanan 48-yard field goal TOL 20–6; 8 plays, 45 yards, 00:41

Third quarter

- (11:20) TOL FG: Dylan Cunanan 47-yard field goal TOL 23–6; 9 plays, 46 yards, 3:40
- (00:24) MIA TD: Kevin Davis 9-yard pass from Brett Gabbert (Dom Dzioban kick) TOL 23–13; 3 plays, 18 yards, 00:55

Fourth quarter

- (11:32) TOL TD: Anthony Torres 1-yard pass from Tucker Gleason (Dylan Cunanan kick) TOL 30–13; 8 plays, 75 yards, 3:52
- (05:46) MIA TD: Javon Tracy 3-yard pass from Brett Gabbert (Dom Dzioban kick) TOL 30–20; 15 plays, 75 yards, 5:46

Statistics	M-OH	TOL
First downs	18	25
Total yards	350	396
Rushing yards	54	78
Passing yards	296	318
Passing: Comp–Att–Int	23–46–1	27–38–2
Time of possession	30:11	29:49

Team	Category	Player	Statistics
Miami (OH)	Passing	Brett Gabbert	23/46, 296 yards, 2 TD, 1 INT
Miami (OH)	Rushing	Keyon Mozee	11 carries, 40 yards
Miami (OH)	Receiving	Javon Tracy	10 receptions, 119 yards, 1 TD
Toledo	Passing	Tucker Gleason	27/38, 318 yards, 2 TD, 2 INT
Toledo	Rushing	Connor Walendzak	12 carries, 54 yards
Toledo	Receiving	Jerjuan Newton	8 receptions, 127 yards, 1 TD

=== at Buffalo ===
Toledo Rockets (4–1) at Buffalo Bulls (3–2) – Game summary

Quarter	1	2	3	4	Total
Rockets	0	0	7	8	15
Bulls	7	0	14	9	30

at UB Stadium, Amherst, New York

- Date: October 12
- Game time: 12:00 p.m.
- Game weather: 58 °F (14 °C), Sunny
- Game attendance: 13,996
- Referee: Greg Sujack
- TV announcers (ESPNU): Courtney Lyle (play-by-play) and Rene Ingoglia (analyst)

Game information

First quarter

- (04:55) BUF TD: Victor Snow 2-yard run (Upton Bellenfant kick) BUF 3–0; 8 plays, 81 yards, 4:21

Second quarter

- No scoring

Third quarter

- (10:40) BUF TD: Jake Orlando 2-yard pass from C.J. Ogbonna (Upton Bellenfant kick) BUF 14–0; 10 plays, 81 yards, 4:15
- (04:19) BUF TD: C.J. Ogbonna 2-yard run (Upton Bellenfant kick) BUF 21–0; 1 plays, 2 yards, 00:04
- (02:29) TOL TD: Jerjuan Newton 26-yard pass from John Alan Richter (Dylan Cunanan kick) BUF 21–7; 10 plays, 81 yards, 4:15

Fourth quarter

- (13:52) BUF TD: C.J. Ogbonna 1-yard run (Upton Bellenfant miss kick) BUF 27–7; 8 plays, 49 yards, 3:18
- (09:13) BUF FG: Upton Bellenfant 23-yard field goal BUF 30–7; 13 plays, 75 yards, 4:05
- (05:08) TOL TD: Jerjuan Newton 23-yard pass from John Alan Richter, two-point conversion pass Anthony Torres from John Alan Richter BUF 30–15; 13 plays, 75 yards, 4:05

Statistics	TOL	UB
First downs	21	19
Plays–yards	75–418	72–357
Rushing yards	46	230
Passing yards	372	127
Passing: Comp–Att–Int	30–49–0	11–20–0
Time of possession	26:08	33:52

Team	Category	Player	Statistics
Toledo	Passing	John Richter	16/23, 227 yards, 2 TD
Toledo	Rushing	Tucker Gleason	6 carries, 20 yards
Toledo	Receiving	Jerjuan Newton	7 receptions, 159 yards, 2 TD
Buffalo	Passing	CJ Ogbonna	11/20, 127 yards, 1 TD
Buffalo	Rushing	Al-Jay Henderson	18 carries, 142 yards
Buffalo	Receiving	JJ Jenkins	2 receptions, 43 yards

=== at Northern Illinois ===
Toledo Rockets (4–2) at Northern Illinois Huskies (4–2) – Game summary

Quarter	1	2	3	4	Total
Rockets	0	7	3	3	13
Huskies	3	3	0	0	6

at Huskie Stadium, DeKalb, Illinois

- Date: October 19
- Game time: 3:30 p.m.
- Game weather: Sunny • Temperature: 72 °F (22 °C) • Wind: N 9 miles per hour (14 km/h)
- Game attendance: 18,350
- Referee: Rich Edwards
- TV announcers (ESPN+): Mike Couzens (play-by-play) and Ryan Cavanaugh (analyst)

Game information

First quarter

- (11:43) NIU FG: Kanon Woodill 36-yard field goal NIU 3–0; 9 plays, 56 yards, 3:17

Second quarter

- (08:08) TOL TD: Jerjuan Newton 52-yard pass from John Richter (Dylan Cunanan kick) TOL 7–3; 2 plays, 61 yards, 00:40
- (00:00) NIU FG: Kanon Woodill 37-yard field goal TOL 7–6; 9 plays, 60 yards, 1:16

Third quarter

- (02:22) TOL FG: Dylan Cunanan 22-yard field goal TOL 10–6; 12 plays, 88 yards, 4:39

Fourth quarter

- (11:12) TOL FG: Dylan Cunanan 27-yard field goal TOL 13–6; 10 plays, 56 yards, 3:58

Statistics	TOL	NIU
First downs	15	25
Plays–yards	65–285	92–391
Rushing yards	133	181
Passing yards	152	210
Passing: Comp–Att–Int	15–28–0	22–46–0
Time of possession	23:25	36:35

Team	Category	Player	Statistics
Toledo	Passing	John Richter	15/28, 152 yards, TD
Toledo	Rushing	Connor Walendzak	19 carries, 78 yards
Toledo	Receiving	Jerjuan Newton	3 receptions, 64 yards, TD
Northern Illinois	Passing	Josh Holst	22/46, 210 yards
Northern Illinois	Rushing	Gavin Williams	16 carries, 78 yards
Northern Illinois	Receiving	Cam Thompson	5 receptions, 80 yards

=== vs. Bowling Green (rivalry) ===
Bowling Green Falcons (3–4) at Toledo Rockets (5–2) – Game summary

Quarter	1	2	3	4	Total
Falcons	14	14	3	10	41
Rockets	7	13	6	0	26

at Glass Bowl, Toledo, Ohio

- Date: October 26
- Game time: 3:30 p.m.
- Game weather: Sunny • Temperature: 58 °F (14 °C) • Wind: NW at 9 miles per hour (14 km/h)
- Game attendance: 29,697
- Referee: Matt Packowski
- TV announcers (ESPN+): Michael Reghi (play-by-play) and Je'Rod Cherry (analyst)

Game information

First quarter

- (11:06) BGSU – Terion Stewart 5-yard run, Zach Long kick (Drive: 5 plays, 45 yards, 2:42; BGSU 7–0)
- (6:57) TOL – Jerjuan Newton 4-yard pass from Tucker Gleason, Dylan Cunanan kick (Drive: 9 plays, 75 yards, 4:11; Tied 7–7)
- (2:40) BGSU – Harold Fannin Jr. 9-yard pass from Connor Bazelak, Zach Long kick (Drive: 5 plays, 54 yards, 1:58; BGSU 14–7)

Second quarter

- (14:06) TOL – Dylan Cunanan 54-yard field goal (Drive: 10 plays, 39 yards, 3:34; BGSU 14–10)
- (8:55) BGSU – Levi Gazarek 2-yard pass from Connor Bazelak, Zach Long kick (Drive: 9 plays, 79 yards, 5:05; BGSU 21–10)
- (2:58) TOL – Tucker Gleason 12-yard run (Drive: 14 plays, 75 yards, 5:57; BGSU 21–17)
- (1:02) BGSU – Jordan Oladokun 61-yard interception return, Zach Long kick (BGSU 28–17)
- (0:00) TOL – Dylan Cunanan 27-yard field goal (Drive: 6 plays, 41 yards, :53; BGSU 28–20)

Third quarter

- (8:42) TOL – Jerjuan Newton 64-yard pass from Tucker Gleason, Two-point pass failed (Drive: 5 plays, 93 yards, 2:03; BGSU 28–26)
- (5:33) BGSU – Zach Long 47-yard field goal (Drive: 8 plays, 44 yards, 3:03; BGSU 31–26)

Fourth quarter

- (14:58) BGSU – Zach Long 35-yard field goal (Drive: 7 plays, 64 yards, 2:44; BGSU 34–26)
- (5:11) BGSU – Rahkeem Smith 19-yard run, Zach Long kick (Drive: 5 plays, 60 yards, 3:23; BGSU 41–26)

Statistics	BGSU	TOL
First downs	23	23
Plays–yards	65–402	73–422
Rushing yards	37–215	28–102
Passing yards	187	320
Passing: Comp–Att–Int	18–28–0	30–45–2
Time of possession	32:29	27:31

Team	Category	Player	Statistics
Bowling Green	Passing	Connor Bazelak	17/27, 171 yards, 2 TD
Bowling Green	Rushing	Terion Stewart	21 carries, 99 yards, TD
Bowling Green	Receiving	Harold Fannin Jr.	6 receptions, 74 yards, TD
Toledo	Passing	Tucker Gleason	30/45, 320 yards, 2 TD, 2 INT
Toledo	Rushing	Connor Walendzak	15 carries, 58 yards
Toledo	Receiving	Jerjuan Newton	9 receptions, 164 yards, 2 TD

=== at Eastern Michigan ===
Toledo Rockets (5–3) at Eastern Michigan Eagles (5–3) – Game summary

Quarter	1	2	3	4	Total
Rockets	0	7	0	22	29
Eagles	7	3	9	9	28

at Rynearson Stadium, Ypsilanti, Michigan

- Date: November 2
- Game time: 12:00 p.m.
- Game weather: Sunny • Temperature: 49 °F (9 °C) • Wind: SE 3 miles per hour (4.8 km/h)
- Game attendance: 13,044
- Referee: Andrew Spaciale
- TV announcers (ESPNU): Matt Schumacker (play-by-play) and Dustin Fox (analyst)

Game information

First quarter

- (1:39) EMU – Markus Allen 6-yard pass from Cole Snyder, Jesus Gomez kick (Drive: 11 plays, 89 yards, 4:24; Eastern Michigan 7–0)

Second quarter

- (11:30) TOL – Tucker Gleason 3-yard run, Dylan Cunanan kick (Drive: 7 plays, 54 yards, 3:19; Tied 7–7)
- (7:10) EMU – Jesus Gomez 45-yard field goal (Drive: 10 plays, 48 yards, 4:20; Eastern Michigan 10–7)

Third quarter

- (8:08) EMU – Jesus Gomez 32-yard field goal (Drive: 12 plays, 64 yards, 6:47; Eastern Michigan 13–7)
- (1:25) EMU – Joey Mattord 1-yard run (Drive: 10 plays, 41 yards, 4:27; Eastern Michigan 19–7)

Fourth quarter

- (12:55) TOL – Anthony Torres 78-yard pass from Tucker Gleason, Dylan Cunanan kick (Drive: 3 plays, 80 yards, 0:51; Eastern Michigan 19–14)
- (9:51) TOL – Junior Vandeross III 25-yard pass from Tucker Gleason, Jerjuan Newton pass (Drive: 2 plays, 27 yards, 0:44; Toledo 22–19)
- (7:08) EMU – Jesus Gomez 28-yard field goal (Drive: 8 plays, 70 yards, 2:38; Tied 22–22)
- (1:56) TOL – Thomas Zsiros 25-yard pass from Tucker Gleason, Dylan Cunanan kick (Drive: 5 plays, 60 yards, 2:48; Toledo 29–22)
- (0:00) EMU – Terry Lockett 36-yard pass from Cole Snyder (Drive: 8 plays, 82 yards, 1:00; Toledo 29–28)

Statistics	TOL	EMU
First downs	16	24
Plays–yards	66–418	88–433
Rushing yards	167	168
Passing yards	251	265
Passing: Comp–Att–Int	18–34–1	24–46–1
Time of possession	24:32	35:28

Team	Category	Player	Statistics
Toledo	Passing	Tucker Gleason	18/34, 251 yards, 3 TD, INT
Toledo	Rushing	Sevaughn Clark	10 carries, 78 yards
Toledo	Receiving	Anthony Torres	1 reception, 78 yards, TD
Eastern Michigan	Passing	Cole Snyder	24/45, 265 yards, 2 TD, INT
Eastern Michigan	Rushing	Cole Snyder	12 carries, 65 yards
Eastern Michigan	Receiving	Oran Singleton	8 receptions, 103 yards

=== vs. Central Michigan ===
Central Michigan Chippewas (3–6) at Toledo Rockets (6–3) – Game summary

Quarter	1	2	3	4	Total
Chippewas	3	0	0	7	10
Rockets	7	20	7	3	37

at Glass Bowl, Toledo, Ohio

- Date: November 12
- Game time: 7:00 p.m.
- Game weather: Sunny • Temperature: 42 °F (6 °C) • Wind: W 2 miles per hour (3.2 km/h)
- Game attendance: 14,661
- Referee: Billy Williams
- TV announcers (ESPNU): Matt Schumacker (play-by-play) and Dustin Fox (analyst)

Game information

First quarter

- (8:29) CMU – Tristan Mattson 34-yard field goal (Drive: 11 plays, 62 yards, 6:25; Central Michigan 3–0)
- (4:26) TOL – Tucker Gleason 9-yard run, Dylan Cunanan kick (Drive: 10 plays, 71 yards, 3:58; Toledo 7–3)

Second quarter

- (12:42) TOL – Dylan Cunanan 30-yard field goal (Drive: 12 plays, 77 yards, 4:27; Toledo 10–3)
- (4:48) TOL – Tucker Gleason 30-yard run, Dylan Cunanan kick (Drive: 7 plays, 75 yards, 2:20; Toledo 17–3)
- (0:22) TOL – Nasir Bowers 45-yard interception, Dylan Cunanan kick (Toledo 24–3)
- (0:00) TOL – Dylan Cunanan 32-yard field goal (Drive: 2 plays, 0 yards, 0:07; Toledo 27–3)

Third quarter

- (7:17) TOL – Zy'marion Lang 27-yard pass from Tucker Gleason, Dylan Cunanan kick (Drive: 7 plays, 60 yards, 2:38; Toledo 34–3)

Fourth quarter

- (9:53) TOL – Dylan Cunanan 40-yard field goal (Drive: 4 plays, -11 yards, 1:59; Toledo 37–3)
- (1:28) CMU – Marion Lukes 2-yard run, Tristan Mattson kick (Drive: 11 plays, 70 yards, 4:07; Toledo 37–10)

Statistics	CMU	TOL
First downs	16	19
Plays–yards	64–236	61–299
Rushing yards	86	159
Passing yards	150	140
Passing: Comp–Att–Int	16–27–2	14–24–0
Time of possession	32:49	27:11

Team	Category	Player	Statistics
Central Michigan	Passing	Jadyn Glasser	16/27, 150 yards, 2 INT
Central Michigan	Rushing	Marion Lukes	19 carries, 80 yards, TD
Central Michigan	Receiving	Chris Parker	5 receptions, 52 yards
Toledo	Passing	Tucker Gleason	13/23, 136 yards, TD
Toledo	Rushing	Tucker Gleason	8 carries, 66 yards, 2 TD
Toledo	Receiving	Jerjuan Newton	3 receptions, 40 yards

=== vs. Ohio ===
Ohio Bobcats (7–3) at Toledo Rockets (7–3) – Game summary

Quarter	1	2	3	4	Total
Bobcats	0	0	7	17	24
Rockets	0	7	0	0	7

at Glass Bowl, Toledo, Ohio

- Date: November 20
- Game time: 7:00 p.m.
- Game weather: Cloudy • Temperature: 42 °F (6 °C) • Wind: SW 8 mph
- Game attendance: 14,543
- Referee: Andrew Speciale (MAC)
- TV announcers (ESPN2): Clay Matvick (play-by-play) and Steve Addazio (analyst)

Game information

First quarter

- No scoring plays

Second quarter

- (10:12) TOL – Anthony Torres 23-yard pass from Tucker Gleason (Dylan Cunanan kick), Drive: 7 plays, 50 yards, 2:16; TOL 7–0

Third quarter

- (06:20) OHIO – Parker Navarro 1-yard run (Gianni Spetic kick), Drive: 7 plays, 45 yards, 3:40; Tied 7–7

Fourth quarter

- (14:19) OHIO – Parker Navarro 2-yard run (Gianni Spetic kick), Drive: 12 plays, 53 yards, 6:27; OHIO 14–7
- (08:07) OHIO – Anthony Tyus III 1-yard run (Gianni Spetic kick), Drive: 8 plays, 60 yards, 4:46; OHIO 21–7
- (03:31) OHIO – Gianni Spetic 24-yard field goal, Drive: 6 plays, 18 yards, 2:26; OHIO 24–7

Statistics	OHIO	TOL
First downs	17	9
Plays–yards	73–367	51–212
Rushing yards	238	39
Passing yards	129	173
Passing: Comp–Att–Int	11–19–1	14–26–0
Time of possession	41:24	18:36

Team	Category	Player	Statistics
Ohio	Passing	Parker Navarro	11/19, 129 yards, INT
Ohio	Rushing	Anthony Tyus III	33 carries, 125 yards, TD
Ohio	Receiving	Caleb Gossett	6 receptions, 86 yards
Toledo	Passing	Tucker Gleason	9/17, 136 yards, TD
Toledo	Rushing	Willie Shaw III	6 carries, 30 yards
Toledo	Receiving	Jerjuan Newton	4 receptions, 45 yards

=== at Akron ===
Toledo Rockets (7–4) at Akron Zips (3–8) – Game summary

Quarter	1	2	3	4	OT	Total
Rockets	0	0	0	14	0	14
Zips	7	0	0	7	7	21

at InfoCision Stadium, Akron, Ohio

- Date: November 26
- Game time: 7:00 p.m.
- Game weather: Sunny
- Game attendance: 4,716
- Referee: Billy Williams
- TV announcers (ESPN2): Matt Schumacker (play-by-play) and Dustin Fox (analyst)

Game information

First quarter

- (10:47) AKR – Ahmarian Granger 72-yard pass from Ben Finley, Garrison Smith kick (Drive: 1 play, 72 yards, 0:11; Akron 7–0)

Second quarter

No scoring plays

Third quarter

No scoring plays

Fourth quarter

- (13:57) AKR – Tahj Bullock 1-yard run, Garrison Smith kick (Drive: 13 plays, 80 yards, 6:54; Akron 14–0)
- (10:47) TOL – Anthony Torres 7-yard pass from Tucker Gleason, Dylan Cunanan kick (Drive: 10 plays, 85 yards, 3:03; Akron 14–7)
- (3:26) TOL – Jerjuan Newton 19-yard pass from Tucker Gleason, Dylan Cunanan kick (Drive: 7 plays, 92 yards, 2:41; Tied 14–14)

Overtime

- (0:00) AKR – Charles Kellom 25-yard pass from Ben Finley, Garrison Smith kick (Drive: 1 play, 25 yards, 0:00; Akron 21–14)

Statistics	TOL	AKR
First downs	30	18
Plays–yards	86–465	57–328
Rushing yards	176	107
Passing yards	289	221
Passing: Comp–Att–Int	31–44–0	12–23–0
Time of possession	32:24	27:36

Team	Category	Player	Statistics
Toledo	Passing	Tucker Gleason	31/44, 289 yards, 2 TD
Toledo	Rushing	Connor Walendzak	19 carries, 87 yards
Toledo	Receiving	Junior Vandeross III	11 receptions, 84 yards
Akron	Passing	Ben Finley	10/21, 194 yards, 2 TD
Akron	Rushing	Charles Kellom	21 carries, 69 yards
Akron	Receiving	Ahmarian Granger	2 receptions, 106 yards, TD

=== vs. Pittsburgh (GameAbove Sports Bowl) ===
2024 GameAbove Sports Bowl
Pittsburgh Panthers (7–5) vs Toledo Rockets (7–5) – Game summary

Quarter	1	2	3	4	OT	2OT	3OT	4OT	5OT	6OT	Total
Panthers	2	10	11	7	7	3	2	2	2	0	46
Rockets	6	14	0	10	7	3	2	2	2	2	48

at Ford Field • Detroit, Michigan

- Date: Thursday, December 26, 2024
- Game time: 2:00 p.m. EST
- Game weather: Indoor
- Game attendance: 26,219
- Referee: Ron Hudson
- TV announcers (ESPN): Matt Schumacker (play-by-play), Dustin Fox (analyst), and Harry Lyles Jr. (sideline)

Game information

First Quarter

- (11:42) UT – Anthony Torres 2 yard pass from Tucker Gleason, PAT kick blocked (Drive: 8 plays, 75 yards, 3:18; Toledo 6–0)
- (11:42) PITT – Kyle Lewis defensive PAT conversion (Drive: 8 plays, 75 yards, 3:18; Toledo 6–2)

Second Quarter

- (14:56) PITT – Desmond Reid 3 yard run, Ben Sauls kick (Drive: 11 plays, 79 yards, 4:35; Pittsburgh 9–6)
- (11:12) PITT – Ben Sauls 57 yard field goal (Drive: 7 plays, 31 yards, 2:51; Pittsburgh 12–6)
- (7:38) UT – Junior Vandeross III 67 yard pass from Tucker Gleason, Dylan Cunanan kick (Drive: 4 plays, 93 yards, 1:06; Toledo 13–12)
- (7:24) UT – Braden Awls 42 yard interception return, Dylan Cunanan kick (Drive: 1 plays, 0 yards, 0:14; Toledo 20-12)

Third Quarter

- (6:55) PITT – Jake Overman 11 yard pass from Julian Dugger, David Lynch pass to Gavin Bartholomew for 2-Point Conversion (Drive: 10 plays, 71 yards, 3:47; Tie 20–20)
- (3:23) PITT – Ben Sauls 37 yard field goal (Drive: 7 plays, 37 yards, 3:18; Pittsburgh 23–20)

Fourth Quarter

- (13:11) PITT – Raphael Williams Jr. 16 yard pass from Julian Dugger, Ben Sauls kick (Drive: 6 plays, 34 yards, 3:04; Pittsburgh 30–20)
- (7:49) UT – Darius Alexander 58 yard interception return, Dylan Cunanan kick (Drive: 7 plays, 32 yards, 3:33; Pittsburgh 30–27)
- (1:45) UT – Dylan Cunanan 51 yard field goal (Drive: 10 plays, 47 yards, 2:54; Tie 30–30)

Overtime

- PITT – Julian Dugger 2 yard run, Ben Sauls kick (Drive: 6 plays, 25 yards; Pittsburgh 37–30)
- UT – Tucker Gleason 1 yard run, Dylan Cunanan kick (Drive: 8 plays, 25 yards; Tie 37–37)

Second Overtime

- UT – Dylan Cunanan 33 yard field goal (Drive: 6 plays, 10 yards; Toledo 40–37)
- PITT – Ben Sauls 19 yard field goal (Drive: 8 plays, 24 yards; Tie 40-40)

Third Overtime

- PITT – Julian Dugger pass to Kenny Johnson for 2-Point Conversion (Drive: 0 plays, 0 yards; Pittsburgh 42–40)
- UT – Tucker Gleason Pass to Terrell Crosby Jr. for 2-Point Conversion (Drive: 0 plays, 0 yards; Tie 42–42)

Fourth Overtime

- UT – Tucker Gleason Pass to Anthony Torres for 2-Point Conversion (Drive: 0 plays, 0 yards; Toledo 44–42)
- PITT – Julian Dugger run for 2-Point Conversion (Drive: 0 plays, 0 yards; Tie 44–44)

Fifth Overtime

- PITT – Julian Dugger pass to Gavin Bartholomew for 2-Point Conversion (Drive: 0 plays, 0 yards; Pittsburgh 46–44)
- UT – Tucker Gleason Pass to Jerjuan Newton for 2-Point Conversion (Drive: 0 plays, 0 yards; Tie 46–46)

Sixth Overtime

- UT – Tucker Gleason Pass to Junior Vandeross III for 2-Point Conversion (Drive: 0 plays, 0 yards; Toledo 48–46)

Statistics	PITT	TOL
First downs	29	18
Total yards	438	416
Rushing yards	301	80
Passing yards	137	336
Passing: Comp–Att–Int	17–32–3	26–50–1
Time of possession	36:12	23:48

Team	Category	Player	Statistics
Pittsburgh	Passing	Julian Dugger	7/13, 72 yards, 2 TD, INT
Pittsburgh	Rushing	Desmond Reid	33 carries, 169 yards, TD
Pittsburgh	Receiving	Raphael Williams Jr.	3 receptions, 36 yards, TD
Toledo	Passing	Tucker Gleason	26/50, 336 yards, 2 TD, INT
Toledo	Rushing	Jacquez Stuart	7 carries, 39 yards
Toledo	Receiving	Junior Vandeross III	12 receptions, 194 yards, TD
