= 2024 Kent State Golden Flashes football team =

American college football season

2024 Kent State Golden Flashes football
- Conference: Mid-American Conference
- Record: 0–12 (0–8 MAC)
- Head coach: Kenni Burns (2nd season)
- Offensive coordinator: Mark Carney (1st season)
- Co-offensive coordinator: Clay Patterson (1st season)
- Offensive scheme: Spread
- Defensive coordinator: Kody Morgan (1st season)
- Base defense: 4–3
- Home stadium: Dix Stadium

2024 Mid-American Conference football standings
	Conf.			Overall
Team	W		L	W		L
Ohio y$	7	–	1	11	–	3
Miami (OH) y	7	–	1	9	–	5
Buffalo	6	–	2	9	–	4
Bowling Green	6	–	2	7	–	6
Western Michigan	5	–	3	6	–	7
Toledo	4	–	4	8	–	5
Northern Illinois	4	–	4	8	–	5
Akron	3	–	5	4	–	8
Eastern Michigan	2	–	6	5	–	7
Central Michigan	2	–	6	4	–	8
Ball State	2	–	6	3	–	9
Kent State	0	–	8	0	–	12
Championship: Ohio 38, Miami (OH) 3
$ – Conference champion; y – Championship game participant

The 2024 Kent State Golden Flashes football team represented Kent State University in the Mid-American Conference during the 2024 NCAA Division I FBS football season. The Golden Flashes were led by Kenni Burns in his second year as the head coach. The Golden Flashes played home games at Dix Stadium, located in Kent, Ohio.

The Golden Flashes finished 0–12 and were the first winless FBS team in a full season since the 2019 Akron Zips. The Golden Flashes' offense scored an average of 13.9 points per game, next-to-last in the FBS, and averaged 233.3 offensive yards per game, which was last in the FBS; the team's defense allowed 44.1 points per game and gave up an average of 516 yards per game, both last in the FBS.

Some lowlights of the season were a 24-55 blowout loss to Pittsburgh to start the season, a loss to FCS Saint Francis (PA), and a 0-71 obliteration against Tennessee. The team would also fail to hold a lead over any opponent until Week 13 against Akron.

== Preseason ==
=== Preseason poll ===
On July 19 the MAC announced the preseason coaches poll. Kent State was picked to finish last out of 12 teams in the conference. The Golden Flashes received zero votes to win the MAC Championship.

== Schedule ==
Date	Time	Opponent	Site	TV	Result	Attendance
August 31	12:00 p.m.	at Pittsburgh*	Acrisure Stadium; Pittsburgh, PA	ESPNU	L 24–55	44,616
September 7	2:30 p.m.	Saint Francis (PA) (FCS)*	Dix Stadium; Kent, OH	ESPN+	L 17–23	11,585
September 14	7:45 p.m.	at No. 7 Tennessee*	Neyland Stadium; Knoxville, TN	SECN	L 0–71	101,915
September 21	3:30 p.m.	at No. 10 Penn State*	Beaver Stadium; University Park, PA	BTN	L 0–56	109,526
September 28	3:30 p.m.	Eastern Michigan^{†}	Dix Stadium; Kent, OH	ESPN+	L 33–52	10,899
October 12	12:00 p.m.	Ball State	Dix Stadium; Kent, OH	ESPN+	L 35–37	7,322
October 19	3:30 p.m.	at Bowling Green	Doyt Perry Stadium; Bowling Green, OH (Anniversary Award)	ESPN+	L 6–27	20,858
October 26	3:30 p.m.	at Western Michigan	Waldo Stadium; Kalamazoo, MI	ESPN+	L 21–52	23,537
November 6	7:00 p.m.	Ohio	Dix Stadium; Kent, OH	ESPNU	L 0–41	5,662
November 13	7:00 p.m.	at Miami (OH)	Yager Stadium; Oxford, OH	ESPNU	L 7–34	5,328
November 19	7:00 p.m.	Akron	Dix Stadium; Kent, OH (Wagon Wheel)	CBSSN	L 17–38	6,768
November 26	7:00 p.m.	at Buffalo	University at Buffalo Stadium; Amherst, NY	ESPN+	L 7–43	11,916
*Non-conference game; ^{†}Homecoming; Rankings from AP Poll and CFP Rankings released prior to game; All times are in Eastern time

== Game summaries ==
=== at Pittsburgh ===
Game One – Kent State Golden Flashes (0–0) at Pittsburgh Panthers (0–0) – Game summary

Quarter	1	2	3	4	Total
Golden Flashes	7	7	10	0	24
Panthers	14	14	14	13	55

at Acrisure Stadium • Pittsburgh, PA

- Date: August 31, 2024
- Game time: 12:00 pm
- Game weather: Sunny • Temperature: 82 °F (28 °C) • Wind: SW at 3 miles per hour (4.8 km/h)
- Game attendance: 44,616
- Referee: Tim Hedgepeth
- TV announcers (ESPNU): Matt Schumacker (play-by-play) and Dustin Fox (analyst)

Game information

First quarter

- (11:56) PIT – Konata Mumpfield 11-yard pass from Eli Holstein, Ben Sauls kick (Drive: 9 plays, 95 yards, 2:59; Pittsburgh 7–0)
- (10:15) PIT – Desmond Reid 78-yard punt return, Ben Sauls kick (Pittsburgh 14–0)
- (6:43) KSU – Luke Floriea 36-yard pass from Devin Kargman, Andrew Glass kick (Drive: 8 plays, 75 yards, 3:32; Pittsburgh 14–7)

Second quarter

- (13:10) PIT – Derrick Davis Jr. 2-yard run, Ben Sauls kick (Drive: 13 plays, 79 yards, 3:55; Pittsburgh 21–7)
- (7:50) PIT – Raphael Williams 7-yard pass from Eli Holstein, Ben Sauls kick (Drive: 8 plays, 55 yards, 3:08; Pittsburgh 28–7)
- (5:28) KSU – Naim Muhammad 34-yard fumble recovery, Andrew Glass kick (Pittsburgh 28–14)

Third quarter

- (9:36) KSU – Chrishon McCray 29-yard pass from Devin Kargman, Andrew Glass kick (Drive: 11 plays, 75 yards, 5:24; Pittsburgh 28–21)
- (8:39) PIT – Desmond Reid 46-yard run, Ben Sauls kick (Drive: 3 plays, 69 yards, 0:52; Pittsburgh 35–21)
- (5:48) KSU – Andrew Glass 36-yard field goal (Drive: 8 plays, 57 yards, 2:51; Pittsburgh 35–24)
- (3:34) PIT – Kenny Johnson 10-yard pass from Eli Holstein, Ben Sauls kick (Drive: 7 plays, 75 yards, 2:14; Pittsburgh 42–24)

Fourth quarter

- (11:52) PIT – Ben Sauls 50-yard field goal (Drive: 5 plays, 24 yards, 1:41; Pittsburgh 45–24)
- (9:32) PIT – Raphael Williams 6-yard pass from Nate Yarnell, Ben Sauls kick (Drive: 5 plays, 55 yards, 1:59; Pittsburgh 52–24)
- (1:47) PIT – Ben Sauls 39-yard field goal (Drive: 11 plays, 32 yards, 2:38; Pittsburgh 55–24)

Statistics	KENT	PITT
First downs	15	31
Total yards	212	560
Rushing yards	31	191
Passing yards	181	369
Passing: Comp–Att–Int	14–28–1	34–48–1
Time of possession	32:26	27:34

Team	Category	Player	Statistics
Kent State	Passing	Devin Kargman	14/28, 181 yards, 2 TD, INT
Kent State	Rushing	Ky Thomas	18 carries, 40 yards
Kent State	Receiving	Luke Floriea	6 receptions, 104 yards, TD
Pittsburgh	Passing	Eli Holstein	30/40, 336 yards, 3 TD, INT
Pittsburgh	Rushing	Desmond Reid	14 carries, 145 yards, TD
Pittsburgh	Receiving	Kenny Johnson	7 receptions, 105 yards, TD

=== Saint Francis (PA) (FCS) ===
Game Two – Saint Francis Red Flash (FCS) (0–1) at Kent State Golden Flashes (0–1) – Game summary

Quarter	1	2	3	4	Total
Red Flash (FCS)	10	10	3	0	23
Golden Flashes	0	14	0	3	17

at Dix Stadium • Kent, OH

- Date: September 7, 2024
- Game time: 2:30 pm
- Game weather: Sunny • Temperature: 60 °F (16 °C) • Wind: NW at 14 miles per hour (23 km/h)
- Game attendance: 11,585
- Referee: Rich Edwards
- TV announcers (ESPN+): Anthony Lima (play-by-play) and Randy Buffington (analyst)

Game information

First quarter

- (9:53) SFU - Mac Plummer 50-yard Plummer field goal, 8 plays, 52 yards, TOP 03:28 (Saint Francis 3–0)
- (3:46) SFU - Jeff Hoenstine 2-yard run (Mac Plummer Kick), 5 plays, 41 yards, TOP 02:18 (Saint Francis 10–0)

Second quarter

- (10:56) SFU - Gavin Thomson 64-yard pass from Jeff Hoenstine (Mac Plummer Kick), 5 plays, 85 yards, TOP 02:37 (Saint Francis 17–0)
- (5:59) KSU - Chrishon McCray 9 Yd pass from Tommy Ulatowski (Andrew Glass Kick), 10 plays, 54 yards, TOP 04:49 (Saint Francis 17–7)
- (1:56) SFU - Mac Plummer 33-yard field goal, 11 plays, 60 yards, TOP 04:03 (Saint Francis 20–7)
- (0:46) KSU - Luke Floriea 23-yard pass from Devin Kargman (Andrew Glass Kick), 8 plays, 68 yards, TOP 01:05 (Saint Francis 20–14)

Third quarter

- (11:30) SFU - Mac Plummer 46-yard field goal 8 plays, 47 yards, TOP 03:30 (Saint Francis 23–14)

Fourth quarter

- (1:38) KSU - Andrew Glass 44-yard field goal 7 plays, 55 yards, TOP 01:26 (Saint Francis 23–17)

Statistics	SFPA	KENT
First downs	16	16
Total yards	402	280
Rushing yards	207	78
Passing yards	195	202
Passing: Comp–Att–Int	11–22–0	23–39–1
Time of possession	34:24	25:36

Team	Category	Player	Statistics
Saint Francis (PA)	Passing	Jeff Hoenstine	11/22, 195 yards, TD
Saint Francis (PA)	Rushing	DeMarcus McElroy	20 carries, 81 yards
Saint Francis (PA)	Receiving	Gavin Thomson	5 receptions, 124 yards, TD
Kent State	Passing	Devin Kargman	22/38, 193 yards, TD, INT
Kent State	Rushing	Ky Thomas	11 carries, 39 yards
Kent State	Receiving	Luke Floriea	6 receptions, 92 yards, TD

=== at No. 7 Tennessee ===
Game Three – Kent State Golden Flashes (0–2) vs No. 7 Tennessee Volunteers (2–0)

Quarter	1	2	3	4	Total
Golden Flashes	0	0	0	0	0
No. 7 Volunteers	37	28	3	3	71

at Neyland Stadium • Knoxville, TN

- Date: September 14, 2024
- Game time: 7:45 p.m.
- Game weather: Cloudy • Temperature: 80 °F (27 °C) • Wind: SE 9 miles per hour (14 km/h)
- Game attendance: 101,915
- Referee: David Smith
- TV announcers (SECN): Tom Hart (play-by-play), Jordan Rodgers (analyst), and Cole Cubelic (sideline)

Game information

First quarter

- (11:32) TEN – Dylan Sampson 22-yard run, Max Gilbert kick (Drive: 7 plays, 73 yards, 1:25; Tennessee 7–0)
- (10:35) TEN – 0-yard safety (Tennessee 9–0)
- (8:11) TEN – Dylan Sampson 1-yard run, Max Gilbert kick (Drive: 7 plays, 48 yards, 2:16; Tennessee 16–0)
- (5:56) TEN – Chris Brazzell II 53-yard pass from Nico Iamaleava, Max Gilbert kick (Drive: 3 plays, 51 yards, 0:33; Tennessee 23–0)
- (3:35) TEN – DeSean Bishop 53-yard run, Max Gilbert kick (Drive: 1 play, 53 yards, 0:11; Tennessee 30–0)
- (0:02) TEN – Dylan Sampson 1-yard run, Max Gilbert kick (Drive: 8 plays, 48 yards, 3:28; Tennessee 37–0)

Second quarter

- (13:06) TEN – DeSean Bishop 47-yard run, Max Gilbert kick (Drive: 4 plays, 56 yards, 1:03; Tennessee 44–0)
- (7:49) TEN – Dylan Sampson 14-yard run, Max Gilbert kick (Drive: 7 plays, 54 yards, 2:04; Tennessee 51–0)
- (3:06) TEN – Miles Kitselman 15-yard pass from Gaston Moore, Max Gilbert kick (Drive: 6 plays, 90 yards, 1:56; Tennessee 58–0)
- (0:19) TEN – Mike Matthews 18-yard pass from Gaston Moore, Max Gilbert kick (Drive: 6 plays, 48 yards, 1:20; Tennessee 65–0)

Third quarter

- (12:04) TEN – Max Gilbert 36-yard field goal (Drive: 9 plays, 58 yards, 2:56; Tennessee 68–0)

Fourth quarter

- (14:05) TEN – Max Gilbert 21-yard field goal (Drive: 12 plays, 79 yards, 6:59; Tennessee 71–0)

Statistics	KENT	TENN
First downs	8	32
Total yards	112	740
Rushing yards	54	456
Passing yards	58	284
Passing: Comp–Att–Int	9–16–0	16–25–0
Turnovers	0	0
Time of possession	28:10	31:50

Team	Category	Player	Statistics
Kent State	Passing	Devin Kargman	9/15, 58 yards
Kent State	Rushing	JD Sherrod	7 carries, 56 yards
Kent State	Receiving	Chrishon McCray	3 receptions, 27 yards
Tennessee	Passing	Nico Iamaleava	10/16, 173 yards, TD
Tennessee	Rushing	Dylan Sampson	13 carries, 101 yards, 4 TD
Tennessee	Receiving	Dont'e Thornton Jr.	2 receptions, 64 yards

=== at No. 10 Penn State ===
Game Four – Kent State Golden Flashes (0–3) at No. 10 Penn State Nittany Lions (2–0) – Game summary

Quarter	1	2	3	4	Total
Golden Flashes	0	0	0	0	0
No. 10 Nittany Lions	7	21	14	14	56

at Beaver Stadium • State College, PA

- Date: Saturday September 21, 2024
- Game time: 3:30 p.m. EDT
- Game weather: Light Rain then Sunny, 77 °F (25 °C)
- Game attendance: 109,526
- Referee: Ron Snodgrass
- TV announcers (BTN): Jeff Levering (play-by-play), Jake Butt (analyst) and Brooke Fletcher (sideline)
- ESPN box score

Game information

First quarter

- PSU – Tyler Warren, 16-yard TD pass from Drew Allar, Sander Sahaydak kick, 2:38 (PSU 7–0)

Second quarter

- PSU – Nicholas Singleton, 17-yard TD pass from Warren, Sahaydak kick, 5:49 (PSU 14–0)
- PSU – Liam Clifford, 14-yard TD pass from Allar, Sahaydak kick, 1:29 (PSU 21–0)
- PSU – Allar, 5-yard TD run, Sahaydak kick, 0:15 (PSU 28–0)

Third quarter

- PSU – Omari Evans, 59-yard TD pass from Allar, Sahaydak kick, 13:13 (PSU 35–0)
- PSU – Khalil Dinkins, 13-yard TD pass from Beau Pribula, Sahaydak kick, 4:55 (PSU 42–0)

Fourth quarter

- PSU – Cam Wallace, 1-yard TD run, Sahaydak kick, 9:21 (PSU 49–0)
- PSU – Pribula, 1-yard TD run, Ryan Barker kick, 1:25 (PSU 56–0)

Statistics	KENT	PSU
First downs	6	40
Total yards	67	718
Rushing yards	49	309
Passing yards	18	409
Passing: Comp–Att–Int	2–13–0	24–31–1
Time of possession	24:19	35:41

Team	Category	Player	Statistics
Kent State	Passing	JD Sherrod	2/6, 18 yards
Kent State	Rushing	Ayden Harris	10 carries, 20 yards
Kent State	Receiving	Ardell Banks	1 reception, 13 yards
Penn State	Passing	Drew Allar	17/21, 309 yards, 3 TD
Penn State	Rushing	Nicholas Singleton	11 carries, 81 yards
Penn State	Receiving	Omari Evans	4 receptions, 116 yards, TD

=== Eastern Michigan ===
Game Five – Eastern Michigan Eagles (3–1) at Kent State Golden Flashes (0–4) – Game summary

Quarter	1	2	3	4	Total
Eagles	7	14	17	14	52
Golden Flashes	7	7	7	12	33

at Dix Stadium • Kent, OH

- Date: Saturday September 28, 2024
- Game time: 3:30 p.m. EDT
- Game weather: Cloudy • Temperature: 80 °F (27 °C) • Wind: E at 4 miles per hour (6.4 km/h)
- Game attendance: 10,899
- Referee: Billy Williams
- TV announcers (ESPN+): Shawn Kenney (play-by-play) and Ryan Cavanaugh (analyst)

Game information

First quarter

- (10:39) EMU – Elijah Jackson-Anderson 4-yard run, Jesus Gomez kick (Drive: 12 plays, 75 yards, 4:21; Eastern Michigan 7–0)
- (0:39) KSU – Ayden Harris 9-yard run, Will Hryszko kick (Drive: 8 plays, 61 yards, 3:39; Tie 7–7)

Second quarter

- (6:36) EMU – Delbert Mimms III 27-yard run, Jesus Gomez kick (Drive: 1 play, 27 yards, 0:06; Eastern Michigan 14–7)
- (5:11) KSU – Luke Floriea 43-yard pass from Tommy Ulatowski, Will Hryszko kick (Drive: 3 plays, 60 yards, 1:20; Tie 14–14)
- (2:12) EMU – Elijah Jackson-Anderson 4-yard run, Jesus Gomez kick (Drive: 10 plays, 75 yards, 2:52; Eastern Michigan 21–14)

Third quarter

- (14:30) KSU – Chrishon McCray 65-yard pass from Tommy Ulatowski, Will Hryszko kick (Drive: 2 plays, 75 yards, 0:40; Tie 21–21)
- (7:10) EMU – Cole Snyder 2-yard run, Jesus Gomez kick (Drive: 3 plays, 30 yards, 0:56; Eastern Michigan 28–21)
- (4:06) EMU – Jesus Gomez 26-yard field goal (Drive: 8 plays, 26 yards, 2:54; Eastern Michigan 31–21)
- (1:51) EMU – Oran Singleton 5-yard pass from Cole Snyder, Jesus Gomez kick (Drive: 3 plays, 24 yards, 0:42; Eastern Michigan 38–21)

Fourth quarter

- (14:02) EMU – Delbert Mimms III 27-yard run, Jesus Gomez kick (Drive: 4 plays, 45 yards, 0:57; Eastern Michigan 45–21)
- (9:21) KSU – Chrishon McCray 68-yard pass from Tommy Ulatowski, two-point conversion failed (Drive: 4 plays, 73 yards, 1:04; Eastern Michigan 45–27)
- (7:02) EMU – Deion Brown 26-yard run, Jesus Gomez kick (Drive: 4 plays, 47 yards, 2:18; Eastern Michigan 52–27)
- (4:07) KSU – Tommy Ulatowski 4-yard run, two-point conversion failed (Drive: 8 plays, 75 yards, 2:47; Eastern Michigan 52–33)

Statistics	EMU	KENT
First downs	30	19
Total yards	486	422
Rushing yards	273	77
Passing yards	213	345
Passing: Comp–Att–Int	26–33–0	15–28–1
Time of possession	33:55	26:05

Team	Category	Player	Statistics
Eastern Michigan	Passing	Cole Snyder	26/33, 213 yards, TD
Eastern Michigan	Rushing	Delbert Mimms III	23 carries, 145 yards, 2 TD
Eastern Michigan	Receiving	Terry Lockett Jr.	8 receptions, 75 yards
Kent State	Passing	Tommy Ulatowski	15/28, 345 yards, 3 TD, INT
Kent State	Rushing	Ayden Harris	14 carries, 63 yards, TD
Kent State	Receiving	Chrishon McCray	5 receptions, 188 yards, 2 TD

Golden Flashes quarterback Tommy Ulatowski threw for a career-high 345 yards and three touchdowns in a homecoming loss. Despite being tied with the Eagles 21–21 in the third quarter, Kent State has still not led a game through five games.

=== Ball State ===
Game Six – Ball State Cardinals (1–4) at Kent State Golden Flashes (0–5) – Game summary

Quarter	1	2	3	4	Total
Cardinals	10	10	7	10	37
Golden Flashes	0	7	7	21	35

at Dix Stadium • Kent, OH

- Date: Saturday October 12, 2024
- Game time: 12:00 p.m. EDT
- Game weather: Cloudy • Temperature: 62 °F (17 °C) • Wind: NE at 5 miles per hour (8.0 km/h)
- Game attendance: 7,322
- Referee: Jeremy Valentine
- TV announcers (ESPN+): Anthony Lima (play-by-play) and Ryan Cavanaugh (analyst)

Game information

First quarter

- (12:14) BSU – Braedon Sloan 1-yard run, Jackson Courville kick (Drive: 5 plays, 35 yards, 1:32; Ball State 7–0)
- (5:38) BSU – Jackson Courville 34-yard field goal (Drive: 12 plays, 45 yards, 6:02; Ball State 10–0)

Second quarter

- (14:54) KSU – Chrishon McCray 24-yard pass from Tommy Ulatowski, Will Hryszko kick (Drive: 4 plays, 74 yards, 0:57; Ball State 10–7)
- (6:49) BSU – Braedon Sloan 1-yard run, Jackson Courville kick (Drive: 6 plays, 44 yards, 2:03; Ball State 17–7)
- (0:42) BSU – Jackson Courville 35-yard field goal (Drive: 10 plays, 55 yards, 3:16; Ball State 20–7)

Third quarter

- (9:28) BSU – Qian Magwood 13-yard pass from Kadin Semonza, Jackson Courville kick (Drive: 11 plays, 75 yards, 5:32; Ball State 27–7)
- (5:47) KSU – Ky Thomas 4-yard run, Will Hryszko kick (Drive: 6 plays, 72 yards, 3:31; Ball State 27–14)

Fourth quarter

- (6:19) KSU – Chrishon McCray 63-yard pass from Tommy Ulatowski, Will Hryszko kick (Drive: 6 plays, 84 yards, 3:18; Ball State 27–21)
- (3:19) BSU – Jackson Courville 38-yard field goal (Drive: 9 plays, 55 yards, 3:00; Ball State 30–21)
- (1:28) KSU – Luke Floriea 18-yard pass from Tommy Ulatowski, Will Hryszko kick (Drive: 10 plays, 62 yards, 1:46; Ball State 30–28)
- (1:13) BSU – Vaughn Pemberton 41-yard run, Jackson Courville kick (Drive: 2 plays, 40 yards, 0:14; Ball State 37–28)
- (0:30) KSU – Chrishon McCray 57-yard pass from Tommy Ulatowski, Will Hryszko kick (Drive: 4 plays, 77 yards, 0:38; Ball State 37–35)

Statistics	BALL	KENT
First downs	24	20
Total yards	406	461
Rushing yards	191	67
Passing yards	215	394
Passing: Comp–Att–Int	21–34–0	17–36–1
Time of possession	33:11	26:49

Team	Category	Player	Statistics
Ball State	Passing	Kadin Semonza	21/34, 215 yards, TD
Ball State	Rushing	Braedon Sloan	22 carries, 76 yards, 2 TD
Ball State	Receiving	Malcolm Gillie	2 receptions, 61 yards
Kent State	Passing	Tommy Ulatowski	17/36, 394 yards, 4 TD, INT
Kent State	Rushing	Ky Thomas	17 carries, 67 yards, TD
Kent State	Receiving	Chrishon McCray	8 receptions, 213 yards, 3 TD

Golden Flashes wide receiver Chrishon McCray hauled in a career-high 213 receiving yards on eight receptions and three touchdowns. For his performance, he was named MAC Offensive Player of the Week. For the second consecutive week, quarterback Tommy Ulatowski threw for a career-high 394 yards and four touchdowns while completing 17 of 36 attempts.

=== at Bowling Green (Anniversary Award) ===
Game Seven – Kent State Golden Flashes (0–6) vs Bowling Green Falcons (2–4) – Game summary

Quarter	1	2	3	4	Total
Golden Flashes	3	3	0	0	6
Falcons	10	10	0	7	27

at Doyt Perry Stadium • Bowling Green, OH

- Date: Saturday October 19, 2024
- Game time: 3:30 p.m. EDT
- Game weather: Sunny • Temperature: 75 °F (24 °C) • Wind: W at 5 miles per hour (8.0 km/h)
- Game attendance: 20,858
- Referee: Greg Sujack
- TV announcers (ESPN+): Jim Barbar (play-by-play) and Randy Buffington (analyst)

Game information

First quarter

- (5:29) BGSU – Zach Long 32-yard field goal (Drive: 9 plays, 84 yards, 4:37; BGSU 3–0)
- (3:15) KSU – Will Hryszko 37-yard field goal (Drive: 6 plays, 65 yards, 2:09; Tied 3–3)
- (1:21) BGSU – Malcolm Johnson Jr. 50-yard pass from Connor Bazelak, Zach Long kick (Drive: 5 plays, 75 yards, 1:54; BGSU 10–3)

Second quarter

- (11:14) BGSU – Zach Long 25-yard field goal (Drive: 8 plays, 60 yards, 3:39; BGSU 13–3)
- (2:46) KSU – Will Hryszko 30-yard field goal (Drive: 9 plays, 51 yards, 3:56; BGSU 13–6)
- (0:23) BGSU – Lucian Anderson III 2-yard run, Zach Long kick (Drive: 10 plays, 73 yards, 2:16; BGSU 20–6)

Third quarter

No scoring plays

Fourth quarter

- (6:32) BGSU – Jamal Johnson 7-yard pass from Connor Bazelak, Zach Long kick (Drive: 9 plays, 63 yards, 5:36; BGSU 27–6)

Statistics	KENT	BGSU
First downs	11	25
Total yards	204	444
Rushing yards	126	131
Passing yards	78	313
Passing: Comp–Att–Int	7–29–3	23–27–0
Time of possession	22:31	37:29

Team	Category	Player	Statistics
Kent State	Passing	Tommy Ulatowski	7/27, 78 yards, 2 INT
Kent State	Rushing	Ky Thomas	14 carries, 121 yards
Kent State	Receiving	Luke Floriea	2 receptions, 35 yards
Bowling Green	Passing	Connor Bazelak	23/27, 313 yards, 2 TD
Bowling Green	Rushing	Terion Stewart	25 carries, 134 yards
Bowling Green	Receiving	Harold Fannin Jr.	10 receptions, 171 yards

=== at Western Michigan ===
Game Eight – Kent State Golden Flashes (0–7) vs Western Michigan Broncos (4–3) – Game summary

Quarter	1	2	3	4	Total
Golden Flashes	0	7	0	14	21
Broncos	14	24	7	7	52

at Waldo Stadium • Kalamazoo, Michigan

- Date: Saturday October 26, 2024
- Game time: 3:30 p.m. EDT
- Game weather: Sunny • Temperature: 56 °F (13 °C) • Wind: NW at 10 miles per hour (16 km/h)
- Game attendance: 23,537
- Referee: Andrew Speciale
- TV announcers (ESPN+): Shawn Kenney (play-by-play) and Charlie Strong (analyst)

Game information

First quarter

- (8:54) WMU – Malique Dieudonne 3-yard pass from Hayden Wolff, Luka Zurak kick (Drive: 11 plays, 83 yards, 6:06; Western Michigan 7–0)
- (4:55) WMU – Jaden Nixon 92-yard run, Luka Zurak kick (Drive: 1 play, 92 yards, 0:20; Western Michigan 14–0)

Second quarter

- (11:42) WMU – Luka Zurak 21-yard field goal (Drive: 7 plays, 53 yards, 3:30; Western Michigan 17–0)
- (8:55) WMU – Jalen Buckley 2-yard run, Luka Zurak kick (Drive: 4 plays, 52 yards, 1:48; Western Michigan 24–0)
- (5:21) WMU – Jalen Buckley 17-yard run, Luka Zurak kick (Drive: 3 plays, 48 yards, 1:39; Western Michigan 31–0)
- (3:54) WMU – Kaevion Mack 17-yard pass from Hayden Wolff, Luka Zurak kick (Drive: 2 plays, 19 yards, 0:40; Western Michigan 38–0)
- (0:10) KSU – Luke Floriea 18-yard pass from Tommy Ulatowski, Will Hryszko kick (Drive: 1 play, 33 yards, 0:13; Western Michigan 38–7)

Third quarter

- (1:04) WMU – Blake Bosma 10-yard pass from Hayden Wolff, Luka Zurak kick (Drive: 4 plays, 80 yards, 1:39; Western Michigan 45–7)

Fourth quarter

- (13:42) KSU – Jay Jay Etheridge 16-yard pass from Tommy Ulatowski, Will Hryszko kick (Drive: 6 plays, 61 yards, 2:22; Western Michigan 45–14)
- (1:04) WMU – Broc Lowry 14-yard run, Luka Zurak kick (Drive: 11 plays, 78 yards, 5:55; Western Michigan 52–14)
- (0:20) KSU – Conner Muldowney 7-yard pass from Tommy Ulatowski, Will Hryszko kick (Drive: 15 plays, 75 yards, 7:27; Western Michigan 52–21)

Statistics	KENT	WMU
First downs	19	23
Total yards	250	579
Rushing yards	136	358
Passing yards	114	221
Passing: Comp–Att–Int	12–25–2	17–24–1
Time of possession	30:15	29:45

Team	Category	Player	Statistics
Kent State	Passing	Tommy Ulatowski	12/24, 114 yards, 3 TD, 2 INT
Kent State	Rushing	Ky Thomas	15 carries, 62 yards
Kent State	Receiving	Luke Floriea	3 receptions, 43 yards, TD
Western Michigan	Passing	Hayden Wolff	15/21, 208 yards, 3 TD, INT
Western Michigan	Rushing	Jaden Nixon	8 carries, 135 yards, TD
Western Michigan	Receiving	Kenneth Womack	2 receptions, 68 yards

=== Ohio ===
Game Nine – Ohio Bobcats (5–3) vs Kent State Golden Flashes (0–8) – Game summary

Quarter	1	2	3	4	Total
Bobcats	10	10	14	7	41
Golden Flashes	0	0	0	0	0

at Dix Stadium • Kent, Ohio

- Date: Wednesday November 6, 2024
- Game time: 7:00 p.m. EDT
- Game weather: Cloudy • Temperature: 58 °F (14 °C) • Wind: SW 3 mph
- Game attendance: 5,662
- Referee: Billy Williams (MAC)
- TV announcers (ESPNU): Mike Corey (play-by-play) and Craig Haubert (analyst)

Game information

First quarter

- (08:30) OHIO – Gianni Spetic 42-yard field goal, Drive: 11 plays, 49 yards, 5:09; OHIO 3–0
- (05:01) OHIO – Anthony Tyus III 19-yard run (Gianni Spetic kick), Drive: 5 plays, 61 yards, 1:54; OHIO 10–0

Second quarter

- (11:54) OHIO – Gianni Spetic 36-yard field goal, Drive: 6 plays, 18 yards, 3:25; OHIO 13–0
- (03:07) OHIO – Parker Navarro 3-yard run (Gianni Spetic kick), Drive: 10 plays, 72 yards, 5:16; OHIO 20–0

Third quarter

- (14:47) OHIO – 'Eamonn Dennis 96-yard kickoff return (Gianni Spetic Kick) OHIO 27–0
- (6:52) OHIO – 'Coleman Owen 61-yard punt return (Gianni Spetic Kick) OHIO 34–0

Fourth quarter

- (14:13) OHIO – Bryce Butler 7-yard pass from Nick Poulos (Gianni Spetic kick), Drive: 6 plays, 79 yards, 3:14; OHIO 41–0

Statistics	OHIO	KENT
First downs	22	7
Total yards	411	114
Rushing yards	262	52
Passing yards	149	62
Passing: Comp–Att–Int	15–25–0	8–18–1
Time of possession	33:18	26:42

Team	Category	Player	Statistics
Ohio	Passing	Parker Navarro	14/24, 142 yards
Ohio	Rushing	Anthony Tyus III	14 carries, 84 yards, TD
Ohio	Receiving	Coleman Owen	4 receptions, 61 yards
Kent State	Passing	Ruel Tomlinson	8/18, 62 yards, INT
Kent State	Rushing	Ky Thomas	15 carries, 50 yards
Kent State	Receiving	Chrishon McCray	3 receptions, 28 yards

=== at Miami (OH) ===
Game Ten – Kent State Golden Flashes (0–9) vs Miami RedHawks (5–4) – Game summary

Quarter	1	2	3	4	Total
Golden Flashes	7	0	0	0	7
RedHawks	10	7	14	3	34

at Yager Stadium • Oxford, Ohio

- Date: Wednesday November 13, 2024
- Game time: 7:00 p.m. EDT
- Game weather: Cloudy • Temperature: 51 °F (11 °C) • Wind: NW 10 miles per hour (16 km/h)
- Game attendance: 5,328
- Referee: Greg Sujack
- TV announcers (ESPNU): Shawn Kenney (play-by-play) and Charlie Strong (analyst)

Game information

First quarter

- (13:40) KENT – Chrison McCray 11-yard pass from Tommy Ulatowski (Will Hryszko kick) (Drive: 3 plays, 25 yards, 1:01; Kent State 7-0)
- (8:09) MOH – Reggie Virgil 69-yard pass from Brett Gabbert (Dom Dzioban kick) (Drive: 1 play, 69 yards, 0:11; Tied 7-7)
- (3:19) MOH – Dom Dzioban 45-yard field goal (Drive: 9 plays, 42 yards, 3:38; Miami Ohio 10-7

Second quarter

- (11:18) MOH – Javon Tracy 34-yard pass from Brett Gabbert (Dom Dzioban kick) (Drive: 3 plays, 77 yards, 1:32; Miami Ohio 17-7)

Third quarter

- (9:52) MOH – Kevin Davis 6-yard run (Dom Dzioban kick) (Drive: 7 plays, 60 yards, 3:56; Miami Ohio 24-7)
- (0:02) MOH – Keyon Mozee 74-yard run (Dom Dzioban kick) (Drive: 2 plays, 75 yards, 0:53; Miami Ohio 31-7)

Fourth quarter

- (11:40) MOH – Dom Dzioban 25-yard field goal (Drive: 5 plays, 15 yards, 3:00; Miami Ohio 34-7)

Statistics	KENT	M-OH
First downs	15	19
Total yards	61–183	61–479
Rushing yards	37–101	39–277
Passing yards	82	202
Passing: Comp–Att–Int	10–24–1	10–22–0
Time of possession	27:23	32:37

Team	Category	Player	Statistics
Kent State	Passing	Tommy Ulatowski	10/21, 82 yards, TD, INT
Kent State	Rushing	Ky Thomas	15 carries, 58 yards
Kent State	Receiving	Luke Floriea	4 receptions, 32 yards
Miami (OH)	Passing	Brett Gabbert	10/22, 202 yards, 2 TD
Miami (OH)	Rushing	Keyon Mozee	19 carries, 196 yards, TD
Miami (OH)	Receiving	Reggie Virgil	2 receptions, 88 yards, TD

=== Akron (Wagon Wheel) ===
Game Eleven – Akron Zips (2–8) vs Kent State Golden Flashes (0–10) – Game summary

Quarter	1	2	3	4	Total
Zips	10	13	15	0	38
Golden Flashes	7	3	0	7	17

at Dix Stadium • Kent, Ohio

- Date: Tuesday November 19, 2024
- Game time: 7:00 p.m. EDT
- Game weather: Cloudy • Temperature: 56 °F (13 °C) • Wind: S 4 miles per hour (6.4 km/h)
- Game attendance: 6,768
- Referee: Matt Packowski
- TV announcers (CBSSN): John Sadak (play-by-play) and Ross Tucker (analyst)

Game information

First quarter

- (13:31) KENT – Luke Floriea 80-yard pass from Tommy Ulatowski, Will Hryszko kick (Drive: 3 plays, 84 yards, 1:20; Kent State 7–0)
- (10:34) AKR – Garrison Smith 43-yard field goal (Drive: 7 plays, 42 yards, 2:50; Kent State 7–3)
- (4:15) AKR – Tahj Bullock 3-yard run, Garrison Smith kick (Drive: 8 plays, 50 yards, 3:54; Akron 10–7)

Second quarter

- (13:05) AKR – Charles Kellom 13-yard run, Garrison Smith kick (Drive: 7 plays, 91 yards, 3:58; Akron 17–7)
- (8:35) KENT – Will Hryszko 40-yard field goal (Drive: 8 plays, 53 yards, 4:30; Akron 17–10)
- (6:01) AKR – Garrison Smith 26-yard field goal (Drive: 9 plays, 62 yards, 2:31; Akron 20–10)
- (0:00) AKR – Garrison Smith 27-yard field goal (Drive: 9 plays, 89 yards, 1:43; Akron 23–10)

Third quarter

- (10:52) AKR – Tahj Bullock 8-yard run, Garrison Smith kick (Drive: 9 plays, 65 yards, 4:08; Akron 30–10)
- (4:17) AKR – Jarvis Rush 36-yard pass from Ben Finley, Charles Kellom pass (Drive: 7 plays, 81 yards, 4:38; Akron 38–10)

Fourth quarter

- (5:08) KENT – Chrishon McCray 37-yard pass from Tommy Ulatowski, Will Hryszko kick (Drive: 4 plays, 59 yards, 1:16; Akron 38–17)

Statistics	AKR	KENT
First downs	28	9
Total yards	527	281
Rushing yards	277	52
Passing yards	250	229
Passing: Comp–Att–Int	14–31–0	12–20–1
Time of possession	36:32	23:28

Team	Category	Player	Statistics
Akron	Passing	Ben Finley	14/29, 250 yards, TD
Akron	Rushing	Jordan Simmons	11 carries, 113 yards
Akron	Receiving	Adrian Norton	5 receptions, 107 yards
Kent State	Passing	Tommy Ulatowski	12/20, 229 yards, 2 TD, INT
Kent State	Rushing	Ky Thomas	13 carries, 52 yards
Kent State	Receiving	Luke Floriea	3 receptions, 103 yards, TD

=== at Buffalo ===
Game Twelve – Kent State Golden Flashes (0–11) vs Buffalo Bulls (7–4) – Game summary

Quarter	1	2	3	4	Total
Golden Flashes	0	0	7	0	7
Bulls	13	13	7	10	43

at UB Stadium • Amherst, NY

- Date: Tuesday November 26, 2024
- Game time: 7:00 p.m. EDT
- Game weather: Clear • Temperature: 41 °F (5 °C) • Wind: SW 12 miles per hour (19 km/h)
- Game attendance: 11,916
- Referee: Rich Edwards
- TV announcers (ESPN+): Michael Reghi (play-by-play) and Ryan Cavanaugh (analyst)

Game information

First quarter

- (11:41) BUF – C. J. Ogbonna 12-yard run, Upton Bellenfant kick (Drive: 11 plays, 75 yards, 3:19; Buffalo 7–0)
- (5:35) BUF – Tadd Barr 39-yard pass from C. J. Ogbonna (Drive: 9 plays, 91 yards, 4:12; Buffalo 13–0)

Second quarter

- (12:39) BUF – Victor Snow 18-yard pass from C. J. Ogbonna (Drive: 4 plays, 54 yards, 1:40; Buffalo 19–0)
- (3:20) BUF – Al-Jay Henderson 20-yard run, Upton Bellenfant kick (Drive: 6 plays, 65 yards, 3:01; Buffalo 26–0)

Third quarter

- (11:24) KSU – Luke Floriea 27-yard pass from Tommy Ulatowski, Will Hryszko kick (Drive: 4 plays, 39 yards, 1:36; Buffalo 26–7)
- (6:40) BUF – C. J. Ogbonna 11-yard run, Upton Bellenfant kick (Drive: 6 plays, 41 yards, 1:34; Buffalo 33–7)

Fourth quarter

- (14:47) BUF – Upton Bellenfant 42-yard field goal (Drive: 9 plays, 49 yards, 3:43; Buffalo 36–7)
- (5:17) BUF – Javien Cuff 24-yard pass from C. J. Ogbonna, Upton Bellenfant kick (Drive: 4 plays, 42 yards, 2:07; Buffalo 43–7)

Statistics	KENT	UB
First downs	10	26
Total yards	208	446
Rushing yards	106	253
Passing yards	102	193
Passing: Comp–Att–Int	10–18–1	14–22–1
Time of possession	28:41	31:19

Team	Category	Player	Statistics
Kent State	Passing	Tommy Ulatowski	7/12, 91 yards, TD
Kent State	Rushing	Jahzae Kimbrough	14 carries, 65 yards
Kent State	Receiving	Jay Jay Etheridge	6 receptions, 64 yards
Buffalo	Passing	C. J. Ogbonna	14/22, 193 yards, 3 TD, INT
Buffalo	Rushing	Al-Jay Henderson	30 carries, 185 yards, TD
Buffalo	Receiving	Victor Snow	8 receptions, 99 yards, TD
