= Luke Floriea =

American football player (born 2001)

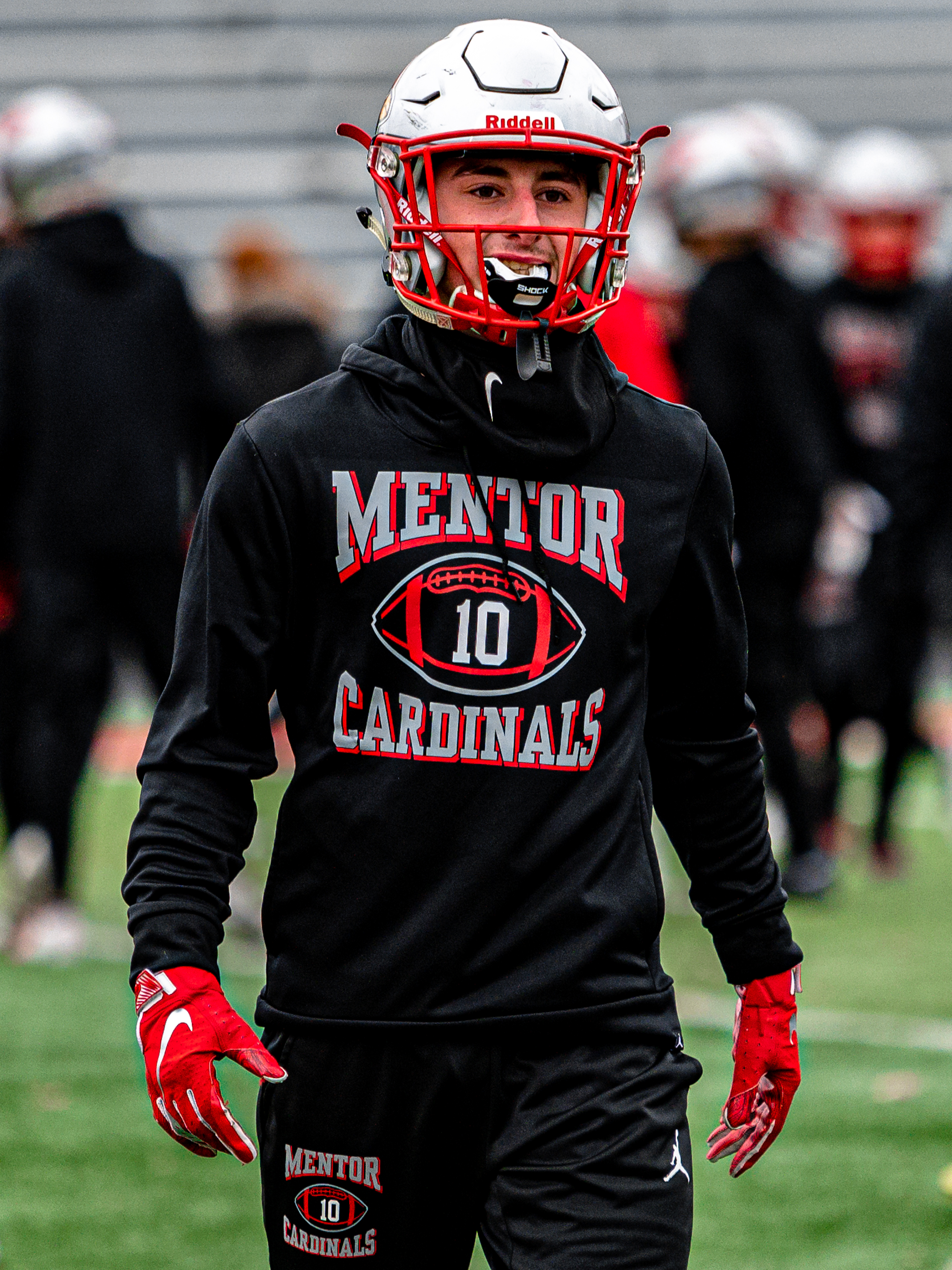
- Floriea with Mentor High School in 2019

Columbus Aviators
- Position: Wide receiver
- Roster status: Unsigned draft pick

Personal information
- Born: October 23, 2001 (age 25); Mentor, Ohio, U.S.
- Listed height: 5 ft 8 in (1.73 m)
- Listed weight: 180 lb (82 kg)

Career information
- High school: Mentor (OH)
- College: Kent State (2020–2024)
- NFL draft: 2025: undrafted

Career history
- Cleveland Browns (2025–2026)*; Columbus Aviators (2027-present)
- * Offseason or practice squad member only
- Stats at Pro Football Reference

Luke Floriea (born October 23, 2001) is an American professional football wide receiver. He played college football for the Kent State Golden Flashes and was signed by the Cleveland Browns in 2025 as an undrafted free agent.

== Early life ==
Floriea attended Mentor High School in Mentor, Ohio. During his junior season, he was named an all-Ohio performer in both football and basketball. Coming out of high school he was rated as a three star recruit and committed to play college football for the Boston College Eagles. However, Floriea later flipped his commitment to play for the Kent State Golden Flashes.

== College career ==
In his first three seasons with the Golden Flashes from 2020 through 2022, Floriea tallied 17 receptions for 209 yards and a touchdown. During the 2023 season, he played in all 12 games, where he notched 39 receptions for 413 yards and four touchdowns. In week one of the 2024 season, Floriea tallied six receptions for 104 yards versus Kentucky. In week two, he recorded six catches for 92 yards and a touchdown. He finished the 2024 season, tallying 44 receptions for 699 yards and seven touchdowns. He finished his Kent State career recording 100 receptions for 1,321 yards and 12 touchdowns.

== Professional career ==
Pre-draft measurables
Height	Weight	Arm length	Hand span	Wingspan	40-yard dash	10-yard split	20-yard split	20-yard shuttle	Three-cone drill	Vertical jump	Broad jump	Bench press
5 ft 8 1/4 in (1.73 m)	179 lb (81 kg)	29 1/8 in (0.74 m)	8 7/8 in (0.23 m)	5 ft 8 1/4 in (1.73 m)	4.51 s	1.53 s	2.70 s	4.19 s	6.95 s	34.0 in (0.86 m)	9 ft 5 in (2.87 m)	14 reps
All values from Pro Day

After not being selected in the 2025 NFL draft, Floriea signed with the Cleveland Browns as an undrafted free agent.

In the Browns' first preseason game against the Carolina Panthers, Floriea caught a pass one handed from fellow rookie quarterback Shedeur Sanders for 30 yards in his only catch of the game. He was waived/injured on August 11, 2025. Floreia was re-signed to the practice squad on September 23. He signed a reserve/future contract with Cleveland on January 5, 2026.

Floriea scored three touchdowns during the 2026 preseason. On August 30, 2026, Floriea was waived by the Browns as a part of final roster cuts.
