= Desmond Reid =

American football player (born 2004)

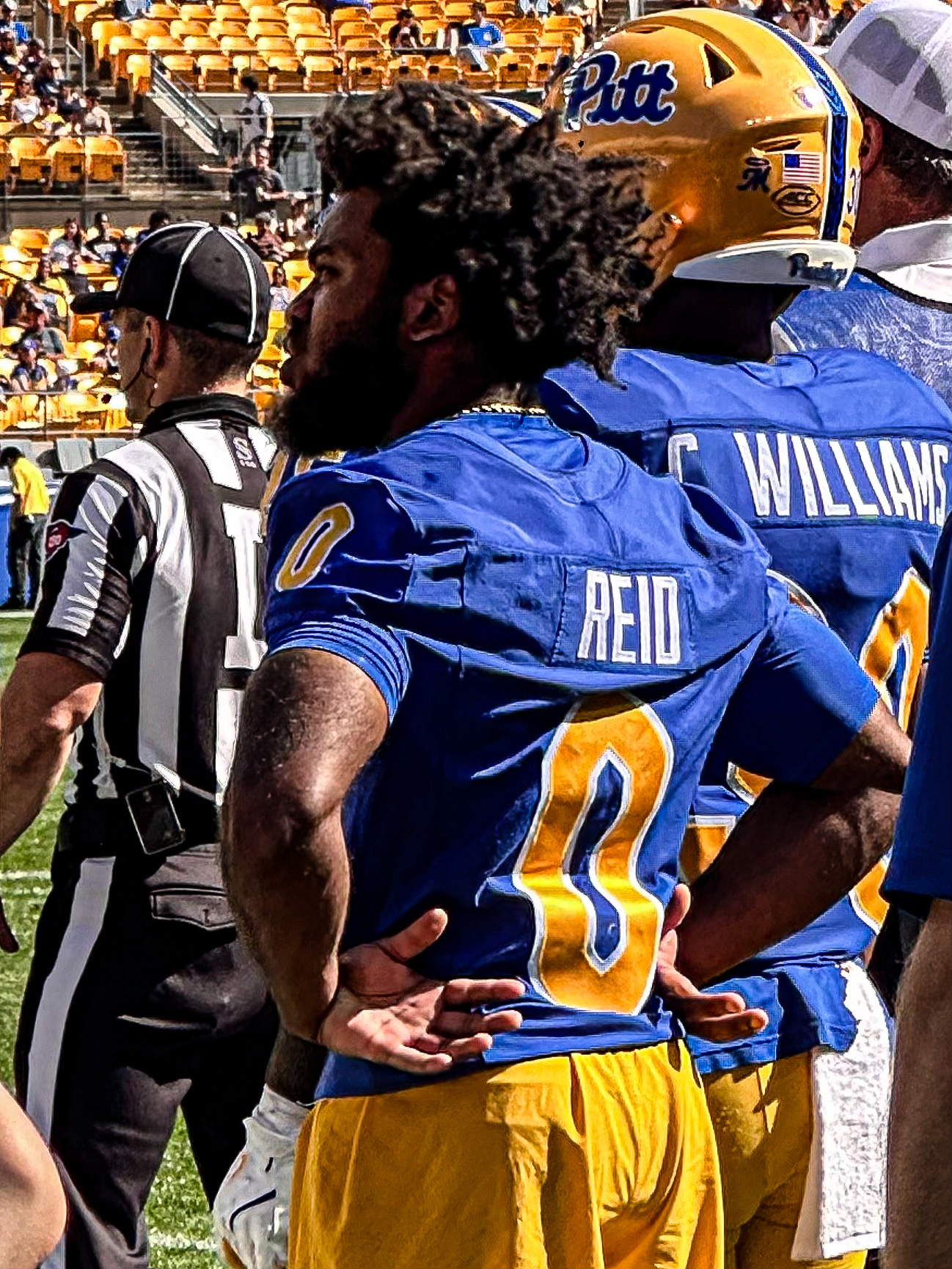
- Reid with the Pittsburgh Panthers in 2025

Profile
- Position: Running back

Personal information
- Born: July 29, 2004 (age 22); Miami Gardens, Florida, U.S.
- Listed height: 5 ft 6 in (1.68 m)
- Listed weight: 174 lb (79 kg)

Career information
- High school: Miramar (Miramar, Florida)
- College: Western Carolina (2022–2023); Pittsburgh (2024–2025)
- NFL draft: 2026: undrafted

Career history
- Buffalo Bills (2026)*
- * Offseason or practice squad member only

Awards and highlights
- First-team All-ACC (2024)
- Stats at Pro Football Reference

Desmond Reid (born July 29, 2004) is an American professional football running back. He played college football for the Western Carolina Catamounts and the Pittsburgh Panthers.

== Early life ==
Reid attended Miramar High School in Miramar, Florida, and committed to play college football for the Western Carolina Catamounts.

== College career ==
=== Western Carolina ===
As a freshman in 2022, Reid rushed for 826 yards and four touchdowns on 119 carries, while also hauling in 21 receptions for 212 yards and a touchdown, earning SoCon freshman of the year honors. In week 5 of the 2023 season, he rushed 18 times for 167 yards and a career-high five touchdowns in a win over The Citadel. In the 2023 season, Reid rushed 131 times for 897 yards and 13 touchdowns, while also adding 21 receptions for 283 yards. After the season, he entered his name into the NCAA transfer portal.

=== Pittsburgh ===
Reid transferred to play for the Pittsburgh Panthers. Heading into the 2024 season, he was named the Panthers starting running back. In the 2024 season opener, Reid notched 231 all-purpose yards, including a 78-yard punt return touchdown and a 46-yard rushing touchdown in a win over Kent State.

== Professional career ==
Pre-draft measurables
Height	Weight	Arm length	Hand span	Wingspan	40-yard dash	10-yard split	20-yard split	20-yard shuttle	Three-cone drill	Vertical jump	Broad jump
5 ft 6 1/4 in (1.68 m)	174 lb (79 kg)	28 1/8 in (0.71 m)	8 1/4 in (0.21 m)	5 ft 9 3/4 in (1.77 m)	4.60 s	1.58 s	2.60 s	4.27 s	7.20 s	35.0 in (0.89 m)	10 ft 0 in (3.05 m)
All values from NFL Combine/Pro Day

On May 8, 2026, Reid signed with the Buffalo Bills as an undrafted free agent. He was waived by Buffalo on June 11 with an injury designation.
