= 2024 Miami RedHawks football team =

American college football season

2024 Miami RedHawks football

Arizona Bowl champion

MAC Championship, L 3–38 vs. Ohio

Arizona Bowl, W 43–17 vs. Colorado State
- Conference: Mid-American Conference
- Record: 9–5 (7–1 MAC)
- Head coach: Chuck Martin (11th season)
- Offensive coordinator: Pat Welsh (2nd season)
- Offensive scheme: Multiple
- Defensive coordinator: Bill Brechin (3rd season)
- Base defense: Multiple
- Home stadium: Yager Stadium

2024 Mid-American Conference football standings
	Conf.			Overall
Team	W		L	W		L
Ohio y$	7	–	1	11	–	3
Miami (OH) y	7	–	1	9	–	5
Buffalo	6	–	2	9	–	4
Bowling Green	6	–	2	7	–	6
Western Michigan	5	–	3	6	–	7
Toledo	4	–	4	8	–	5
Northern Illinois	4	–	4	8	–	5
Akron	3	–	5	4	–	8
Eastern Michigan	2	–	6	5	–	7
Central Michigan	2	–	6	4	–	8
Ball State	2	–	6	3	–	9
Kent State	0	–	8	0	–	12
Championship: Ohio 38, Miami (OH) 3
$ – Conference champion; y – Championship game participant

The 2024 Miami RedHawks football team represented Miami University in the Mid-American Conference during the 2024 NCAA Division I FBS football season. The RedHawks were led by Chuck Martin in his eleventh year as the head coach. The RedHawks played their home games at Yager Stadium, located in Oxford, Ohio.

== Preseason ==
=== Preseason poll ===
On July 19 the MAC announced the preseason coaches poll. Miami was picked to finish first in the conference. The RedHawks received ten votes to win the MAC Championship.

== Schedule ==
Date	Time	Opponent	Site	TV	Result	Attendance
August 31	3:30 p.m.	at Northwestern*	Martin Stadium; Evanston, IL	BTN	L 6–13	12,023
September 14	12:00 p.m.	Cincinnati*	Yager Stadium; Oxford, OH (Victory Bell)	ESPNU	L 16–27	24,717
September 21	3:30 p.m.	at No. 17 Notre Dame*	Notre Dame Stadium; South Bend, IN	NBC	L 3–28	77,622
September 28	3:30 p.m.	UMass*^{†}	Yager Stadium; Oxford, OH	ESPN+	W 23–20 ^{OT}	9,542
October 5	3:30 p.m.	at Toledo	Glass Bowl; Toledo, OH	ESPN+	L 20–30	25,027
October 12	2:00 p.m.	at Eastern Michigan	Rynearson Stadium; Ypsilanti, MI	ESPN+	W 38–14	16,903
October 19	3:30 p.m.	Ohio	Yager Stadium; Oxford, OH (Battle of the Bricks)	ESPN+	W 30–20	17,021
October 26	2:00 p.m.	Central Michigan	Yager Stadium; Oxford, OH	ESPN+	W 46–7	10,661
November 5	8:00 p.m.	at Ball State	Scheumann Stadium; Muncie, IN	ESPN	W 27–21	6,412
November 13	7:00 p.m.	Kent State	Yager Stadium; Oxford, OH	ESPNU	W 34–7	5,328
November 19	8:00 p.m.	Northern Illinois	Yager Stadium; Oxford, OH	ESPN	W 20–9	5,891
November 29	12:00 p.m.	at Bowling Green	Doyt Perry Stadium; Bowling Green, OH	ESPNU	W 28–12	9,345
December 7	12:00 p.m.	vs. Ohio	Ford Field; Detroit, MI (MAC Championship Game / Battle of the Bricks)	ESPN	L 3–38	15,478
December 28	4:30 p.m.	vs. Colorado State*	Arizona Stadium; Tucson, AZ (Arizona Bowl)	The CW	W 43–17	40,076
*Non-conference game; ^{†}Homecoming; Rankings from AP Poll and CFP Rankings released prior to game; All times are in Eastern time

== Game summaries ==
=== at Northwestern ===
Game One – Miami RedHawks (0–0) at Northwestern Wildcats (0–0) – Game summary

Quarter	1	2	3	4	Total
RedHawks	3	0	0	3	6
Wildcats	3	0	7	3	13

at Martin Stadium, Evanston, Illinois

- Date: Saturday August 31, 2024
- Game time: 3:30 p.m.
- Game weather: Sunny • Temperature: 81 °F (27 °C) • Wind: S at 5 miles per hour (8.0 km/h)
- Game attendance: 12,023
- Referee: Sergio DeHoyos
- TV announcers (BTN): Lisa Byington (play-by-play) and Jared Thomas (analyst)
- MiamiRedHawks.com box score

Game information

First quarter

- (7:21) NU – Jack Olsen 45-yard field goal (Drive: 5 plays, 20 yards, 2:20; Northwestern 3–0)
- (1:23) M-OH – Dom Dzioban 43-yard field goal (Drive: 11 plays, 56 yards, 5:54; Tied 3–3)

Second quarter

- No scoring plays

Third quarter

- (9:42) NU – Mike Wright 13-yard run, Jack Olsen kick (Drive: 8 plays, 62 yards, 4:10; Northwestern 10–3)

Fourth quarter

- (14:47) NU – Jack Olsen 38-yard field goal (Drive: 10 plays, 77 yards, 4:42; Northwestern 13–3)
- (7:28) M-OH – Dom Dzioban 26-yard field goal (Drive: 8 plays, 62 yards, 3:42; Northwestern 13–6)

Statistics	M-OH	NU
First downs	17	20
Plays–yards	61–267	61–328
Rushes–yards	23–40	30–150
Passing yards	227	178
Passing: comp–att–int	22–37–2	18–30–0
Time of possession	34:03	25:57

Team	Category	Player	Statistics
Miami (OH)	Passing	Brett Gabbert	22/37, 227 yards, 2 INT
Miami (OH)	Rushing	Jordan Brunson	8 carries, 33 yards
Miami (OH)	Receiving	Cade McDonald	8 receptions, 105 yards
Northwestern	Passing	Mike Wright	18/30, 178 yards
Northwestern	Rushing	Mike Wright	9 carries, 65 yards, 1 TD
Northwestern	Receiving	Bryce Kirtz	6 receptions, 91 yards

=== Cincinnati (Victory Bell) ===
Game Two – Cincinnati Bearcats (1–1) at Miami RedHawks (0–1) – Game summary

Quarter	1	2	3	4	Total
Bearcats	3	7	7	10	27
RedHawks	0	3	7	6	16

at Yager Stadium • Oxford, OH

- Date: September 14, 2024
- Game time: 12:00 p.m.
- Game weather: 83 °F (28 °C)
- Game attendance: 24,717
- Referee: Luke Richmond
- TV announcers (ESPNU): Matt Schumacker (play-by-play) and Dustin Fox (analyst)

Game information

First quarter

- (3:27) CIN – Nathan Hawks 55-yard field goal (Drive: 8 plays, 26 yards, 2:58; Cincinnati 3–0)

Second quarter

- (14:13) MIA – Dom Dzioban 30-yard field goal (Drive: 8 plays, 63 yards, 4:13; Tied 3–3)
- (10:37) CIN – Joe Royer 3-yard pass from Brendan Sorsby, Nathan Hawks kick (Drive: 1 play, 3 yards, 0:00; Cincinnati 10–3)

Third quarter

- (7:38) CIN – Corey Kiner 1-yard run, Nathan Hawks kick (Drive: 12 plays, 75 yards, 7:22; Cincinnati 17–3)
- (5:32) MIA – Reggie Virgil 58-yard pass from Brett Gabbert, Dom Dzioban kick (Drive: 4 plays, 75 yards, 2:06; Cincinnati 17–10)

Fourth quarter

- (13:01) CIN – Evan Pryor 65-yard run, Nathan Hawks kick (Drive: 1 play, 65 yards, 0:13; Cincinnati 24–10)
- (07:57) – Cade McDonald 7-yard pass from Brett Gabbert (Drive: 11 plays, 75 yards, 5:04; Cincinnati 24–16)
- (0:59) CIN – Nathan Hawks 50-yard field goal (Drive: 7 plays, 56 yards, 2:44; Cincinnati 27–16)

Statistics	CIN	M-OH
First downs	20	15
Total yards	401	380
Rushing yards	215	24
Passing yards	186	356
Passing: Comp–Att–Int	21-34-0	25-39-1
Time of possession	31:29	28:31

Team	Category	Player	Statistics
Cincinnati	Passing	Brendan Sorsby	21/34, 186 yards, 1 TD
Cincinnati	Rushing	Corey Kiner	21 carries, 126 yards, 1 TD
Cincinnati	Receiving	Xzavier Henderson	10 receptions, 108 yards
Miami (OH)	Passing	Brett Gabbert	23/25. 339 yds, 2 TD, 1 INT
Miami (OH)	Rushing	Kevin Davis	3 carries, 14 yards
Miami (OH)	Receiving	Cade McDonald	8 receptions, 135 yards, 1 TD

=== at No. 17 Notre Dame ===
Game Three – Miami RedHawks (0–2) vs. No. 17 Notre Dame Fighting Irish (2–1) – Game summary

Quarter	1	2	3	4	Total
RedHawks	0	3	0	0	3
No. 17 Fighting Irish	0	14	7	7	28

at Notre Dame Stadium, South Bend, Indiana

- Date: September 21, 2024
- Game time: 3:30 PM
- Game weather: Temperature: 86 °F (30 °C) • Wind: SW 3 MPH • Weather: Sunny
- Game attendance: 77,622
- Referee: Gary Patterson
- TV announcers (NBC): Dan Hicks (play-by-play), Jason Garrett (analyst), and Zora Stephenson (sideline reporter)

Game information

Second quarter

- (12:32) MIA – Dom Dzioban 26-yard field goal (Drive: 10 plays, 59 yards, 4:09; Miami (OH) 3–0)
- (3:33) ND – Riley Leonard 8-yard rush, Mitch Jeter kick (Drive: 10 plays, 87 yards, 4:59; Notre Dame 7–3)
- (1:05) ND – Beaux Collins 38-yard pass from Riley Leonard, Mitch Jeter kick (Drive: 6 plays, 81 yards, 0:56; Notre Dame 14–3)

Third quarter

- (4:17) ND – Jeremiyah Love 15-yard rush, Mitch Jeter kick (Drive: 7 plays, 60 yards, 3:00; Notre Dame 21–3)

Fourth quarter

- (5:39) ND – Riley Leonard 50-yard rush, Mitch Jeter kick (Drive: 5 plays, 69 yards, 2:34; Notre Dame 28–3)

Statistics	M-OH	ND
First downs	17	24
Total yards	229	428
Rushes/yards	28–110	36–270
Passing yards	119	158
Passing: Comp–Att–Int	14–36–2	17–28–0
Time of possession	29:54	30:06

Team	Category	Player	Statistics
Miami (OH)	Passing	Brett Gabbert	14/35, 119 yards, 2 INT
Miami (OH)	Rushing	Keyon Mozee	6 carries, 36 yards
Miami (OH)	Receiving	Cade McDonald	4 receptions, 52 yards
Notre Dame	Passing	Riley Leonard	16/25, 154 yards, TD
Notre Dame	Rushing	Riley Leonard	12 carries, 143 yards, 2 TD
Notre Dame	Receiving	Beaux Collins	4 receptions, 60 yards, TD

=== UMass ===
Game Four – UMass Minutemen (1–3) at Miami RedHawks (0–3) – Game summary

Quarter	1	2	3	4	OT	Total
Minutemen	7	3	0	10	0	20
RedHawks	7	3	7	3	3	23

at Yager Stadium, Oxford, Ohio

- Date: September 28
- Game time: 3:30 p.m. EDT
- Game attendance: 9,542
- TV announcers (ESPN+): Doug Sherman (play-by-play) and Forrest Conoly (analyst)

Statistics	MASS	M-OH
First downs	15	19
Total yards	344	349
Rushing yards	171	168
Passing yards	173	181
Turnovers	0	1
Time of possession	30:51	29:09

Team	Category	Player	Statistics
UMass	Passing	Taisun Phommachanh	9-22 173 Yards 1 TD
UMass	Rushing	Taisun Phommachanh	18 carries 80 Yards
UMass	Receiving	Jakobie Keeney-James	4 Receptions 150 Yards 1 TD
Miami (OH)	Passing	Brett Gabbert	16-25 181 Yards 1 TD 1 INT
Miami (OH)	Rushing	Keyon Mozee	9 carries 114 Yards 1 TD
Miami (OH)	Receiving	Javon Tracy	5 Receptions 49 Yards 1 TD

=== at Toledo ===
Game Five – Miami RedHawks (1–3) vs Toledo Rockets (3–1) – Game summary

Quarter	1	2	3	4	Total
Redhawks	3	3	7	7	20
Rockets	14	6	3	7	30

at Glass Bowl, Toledo, Ohio

- Date: Saturday October 5, 2024
- Game time: 3:30 p.m.
- Game weather: Sunny • Temperature: 71 °F (22 °C) • Wind: SE at 8 miles per hour (13 km/h)
- Game attendance: 25,027
- Referee: David Siegle
- TV announcers (ESPN+): Michael Reghi (play-by-play) and Marcus Ray (analyst)

Game information

First quarter

- (07:50) TOL TD: Tucker Gleason 1-yard run (Dylan Cunanan kick) TOL 7–0; 9 plays, 37 yards, 3:41
- (05:56) TOL TD: Jerjuan Newton 6-yard pass from Tucker Gleason (Dylan Cunanan kick) TOL 14–0; 3 plays, 18 yards, 00:55
- (1:00) MIA FG: Dom Dzioban 26-yard field goal TOL 14–3; 11 plays, 68 yards, 4:52

Second quarter

- (05:52) TOL FG: Dylan Cunanan 21-yard field goal TOL 17–3; 10 plays, 62 yards, 4:48
- (1:00) MIA FG: Dom Dzioban 35-yard field goal TOL 17–6; 7 plays, 64 yards, 3:10
- (00:03) TOL FG: Dylan Cunanan 48-yard field goal TOL 20–6; 8 plays, 45 yards, 00:41

Third quarter

- (11:20) TOL FG: Dylan Cunanan 47-yard field goal TOL 23–6; 9 plays, 46 yards, 3:40
- (00:24) MIA TD: Kevin Davis 9-yard pass from Brett Gabbert (Dom Dzioban kick) TOL 23–13; 3 plays, 18 yards, 00:55

Fourth quarter

- (11:32) TOL TD: Anthony Torres 1-yard pass from Tucker Gleason (Dylan Cunanan kick) TOL 30–13; 8 plays, 75 yards, 3:52
- (05:46) MIA TD: Javon Tracy 3-yard pass from Brett Gabbert (Dom Dzioban kick) TOL 30–20; 15 plays, 75 yards, 5:46

Statistics	M-OH	TOL
First downs	18	25
Total yards	350	396
Rushing yards	54	78
Passing yards	296	318
Passing: Comp–Att–Int	23–46–1	27–38–2
Time of possession	30:11	29:49

Team	Category	Player	Statistics
Miami (OH)	Passing	Brett Gabbert	23/46, 296 yards, 2 TD, 1 INT
Miami (OH)	Rushing	Keyon Mozee	11 carries, 40 yards
Miami (OH)	Receiving	Javon Tracy	10 receptions, 119 yards, 1 TD
Toledo	Passing	Tucker Gleason	27/38, 318 yards, 2 TD, 2 INT
Toledo	Rushing	Connor Walendzak	12 carries, 54 yards
Toledo	Receiving	Jerjuan Newton	8 receptions, 127 yards, 1 TD

=== at Eastern Michigan ===
Game Six – Miami RedHawks (1–4) vs Eastern Michigan Eagles (4–1) – Game summary

Quarter	1	2	3	4	Total
RedHawks	7	14	0	17	38
Eagles	7	0	7	0	14

at Rynearson Stadium, Ypsilanti, Michigan

- Date: Saturday October 12, 2024
- Game time: 2:00 p.m.
- TV announcers (ESPN+): Michael Reghi (play-by-play) and Marcus Ray (analyst)

Game information

First quarter

- (14:50) MIA – Reggie Virgil 75-yard pass from Brett Gabbert (Dom Dzioban kick) (Drive: 1 play, 75 yards, 0:10; Miami (OH) 7–0)
- (10:04) EMU – Cole Snyder 1-yard run (Jesus Gomez kick) (Drive: 12 plays, 75 yards, 4:46; Tie 7–7)

Second quarter

- (10:02) MIA – Connor Briggs 5-yard pass from Brett Gabbert (Dom Dzioban kick) (Drive: 7 plays, 59 yards, 3:51; Miami (OH) 14–7)
- (0:35) MIA – Reggie Virgil 19-yard pass from Brett Gabbert (Dom Dzioban kick) (Drive: 4 plays, 34 yards, 1:54; Miami (OH) 21–7)

Third quarter

- (2:41) EMU – Delbert Mimms III 1-yard run (Jesus Gomez kick) (Drive: 10 plays, 59 yards, 3:27; Miami (OH) 21–14)

Fourth quarter

- (14:55) MIA – Cole Weaver 24-yard pass from Brett Gabbert (Dom Dzioban kick) (Drive: 5 plays, 80 yards, 2:42; Miami (OH) 28–14)
- (5:01) MIA – Dom Dzioban 44-yard field goal (Drive: 7 plays, 60 yards, 4:34; Miami (OH) 31–14)
- (1:30) MIA – Jordan Brunson 44-yard run (Dom Dzioban kick) (Drive: 3 plays, 51 yards, 0:18; Miami (OH) 38–14)

Statistics	M-OH	EMU
First downs	16	24
Total yards	421	332
Rushing yards	199	121
Passing yards	222	211
Passing: Comp–Att–Int	10-13-0	27-42-1
Time of possession	25:50	34:10

Team	Category	Player	Statistics
Miami (OH)	Passing	Brett Gabbert	10/13, 223 yards, 4 TD
Miami (OH)	Rushing	Keyon Mozee	16 carries, 100 yards, 1 TD
Miami (OH)	Receiving	Reggie Virgil	3 catches, 116 yards, 2 TD
Eastern Michigan	Passing	Cole Snyder	27/42, 211 yards, INT
Eastern Michigan	Rushing	Delbert Mimms III	20 carries, 78 yards, TD
Eastern Michigan	Receiving	Max Reese	7 receptions, 50 yards

=== Ohio (Battle of the Bricks) ===
Game Seven – Ohio Bobcats (4–2) at Miami RedHawks (2–4) – Game summary

Quarter	1	2	3	4	Total
Bobcats	0	0	6	14	20
RedHawks	3	13	14	0	30

at Yager Stadium, Oxford, Ohio

- Date: Saturday October 19, 2024
- Game time: 3:30 p.m. EDT
- Game weather: Sunny • Temperature: 71 °F (22 °C) • Wind: SE 5 mph
- Game attendance: 17,021
- Referee: Matt Packowsi
- TV announcers (ESPN+): Kevin Fitzgerald (play-by-play) and Charlie Strong (analyst)

Game information

First quarter

- (06:42) MIA – Dom Dzioban 28-yard field goal, Drive: 8 plays, 62 yards, 4:24; MIA 3–0

Second quarter

- (08:18) MIA – Reggie Virgil 14-yard pass from Brett Gabbert (Dom Dzioban kick), Drive: 8 plays, 58 yards, 5:08; MIA 10–0
- (00:19) MIA – Javon Tracy 8-yard pass from Brett Gabbert (kick failed), Drive: 6 plays, 43 yards, 2:19; MIA 16–0

Third quarter

- (07:29) OHIO – Anthony Tyus III 1-yard run (pass failed), Drive: 15 plays, 75 yards, 7:31; MIA 16–6
- (01:47) MIA – Keyon Mozee 58-yard run (Dom Dzioban kick), Drive: 1 plays, 58 yards, 0:11; MIA 23–6
- (00:43) MIA – Cade McDonald 28-yard pass from Brett Gabbert (Dom Dzioban kick), Drive: 1 plays, 28 yards, 0:07; MIA 30–6

Fourth quarter

- (05:58) OHIO – Nolan McCormick 1-yard run (Nick Poulos Pass to Caleb Gossett), Drive: 11 plays, 63 yards, 4:12; MIA 30–14
- (00:06) OHIO – Nick Poulas 11-yard run (pass failed), Drive: 11 plays, 90 yards, 1:45; MIA 30–20

Statistics	OHIO	M-OH
First downs	21	15
Total yards	291	330
Rushing yards	110	152
Passing yards	181	178
Passing: Comp–Att–Int	22–43–2	14–21–0
Time of possession	30:51	29:19

Team	Category	Player	Statistics
Ohio	Passing	Nick Poulas	9/21, 93 yards
Ohio	Rushing	Parker Navarro	11 carries, 38 yards
Ohio	Receiving	Rodney Harris II	7 receptions, 82 yards
Miami (OH)	Passing	Brett Gabbert	14/21, 179 yards, 3 TD
Miami (OH)	Rushing	Keyon Mozee	16 carries, 111 yards, TD
Miami (OH)	Receiving	Cade McDonald	5 receptions, 84 yards, TD

=== Central Michigan ===
Game Eight – Central Michigan Chippewas (3–4) at Miami RedHawks (3–4) – Game summary

Quarter	1	2	3	4	Total
Chippewas	7	0	0	0	7
RedHawks	3	13	10	20	46

at Yager Stadium, Oxford, Ohio

- Date: Saturday October 26, 2024
- Game time: 2:00 PM EST
- TV announcers (ESPN+): Doug Sherman (play-by-play) and Forrest Conoly (analyst)

Game information

First quarter

- M-OH – Dom Dzioban 31-yard field goal, 10:02. Miami (OH) 3–0. Drive: 8 plays, 65 yards, 4:48.
- CMU – Myles Bailey 2-yard run (Tristan Mattson kick), 1:59. Central Michigan 7–3. Drive: 15 plays, 75 yards, 8:03.

Second quarter

- M-OH – Reggie Virgil 9-yard pass from Henry Hesson (Dom Dzioban kick), 14:49. Miami (OH) 10–7. Drive: 5 plays, 75 yards, 2:10.
- M-OH – Dom Dzioban 22-yard field goal, 6:29. Miami (OH) 13–7. Drive: 12 plays, 46 yards, 5:33.
- M-OH – Dom Dzioban 23-yard field goal, 0:01. Miami (OH) 16–7. Drive: 10 plays, 67 yards, 1:55.

Third quarter

- M-OH – Dom Dzioban 51-yard field goal, 9:19. Miami (OH) 19–7. Drive: 7 plays, 15 yards, 3:48.
- M-OH – Javon Tracy 36-yard pass from Brett Gabbert (Dom Dzioban kick), 6:18. Miami (OH) 26–7. Drive: 3 plays, 63 yards, 1:16.

Fourth quarter

- M-OH – Dom Dzioban 44-yard field goal, 13:25. Miami (OH) 29–7. Drive: 8 plays, 25 yards, 3:56.
- M-OH – Kevin Davis 2-yard run (Dom Dzioban kick), 11:19. Miami (OH) 36–7. Drive: 3 plays, 70 yards, 1:34.
- M-OH – Jordan Brunson 3-yard run (Kellan McLaughlin kick), 6:48. Miami (OH) 43–7. Drive: 3 plays, 79 yards, 1:44.
- M-OH – Kellan McLaughlin 41-yard field goal, 0:51. Miami (OH) 46–7. Drive: 8 plays, 6 yards, 5:14.

Statistics	CMU	M-OH
First downs	12	19
Total yards	168	518
Rushing yards	106	277
Passing yards	62	241
Passing: Comp–Att–Int	7-17-1	15-25-0
Time of possession	26:49	33:11

Team	Category	Player	Statistics
Central Michigan	Passing	Tyler Jefferson	7/17, 62 yards, INT
Central Michigan	Rushing	Tyler Jefferson	8 carries, 37 yards
Central Michigan	Receiving	Evan Boyd	2 receptions, 21 yards
Miami (OH)	Passing	Brett Gabbert	10/12, 165 yards, TD
Miami (OH)	Rushing	Keyon Mozee	15 carries, 120 yards
Miami (OH)	Receiving	Javon Tracy	5 receptions, 118 yards, TD

=== at Ball State ===
Game Nine – Miami RedHawks (4–4) vs Ball State Cardinals (3–5) – Game summary

Quarter	1	2	3	4	Total
RedHawks	7	14	0	6	27
Cardinals	7	6	8	0	21

at Scheumann Stadium, Muncie, Indiana

- Date: Tuesday November 5, 2024
- Game time: 8:00 p.m.
- Game weather: Rain • Temperature: 69 °F (21 °C) • Wind: S at 17 miles per hour (27 km/h)
- Game attendance: 6,412
- Referee: Andrew Speciale
- TV announcers (ESPN): Matt Schumacker (play-by-play) and Dustin Fox (analyst)

Game information

First quarter

- (8:24) BALL – Brandon Berger 46-yard interception (Jackson Courville kick) (Ball State 7-0)
- (5:48) MOH – Reggie Virgil 34-yard pass from Brett Gabbert (Dom Dzioban kick) (Drive: 5 plays, 75 yards, 2:36; Tied 7-7)

Second quarter

- (13:28) BALL – Jackson Courville 27-yard field goal (Drive: 12 plays, 75 yards, 7:15; Ball State 10-7)
- (8:52) MOH – Kevin Davis 12-yard pass from Brett Gabbert (Dom Dzioban kick) (Drive: 9 plays, 68 yards, 4:32; Miami (OH) 14-10)
- (4:33) BALL – Jackson Courville 21-yard field goal (Drive: 8 plays, 71 yards, 4:19; Miami (OH) 14-13)
- (0:33) MOH – Javon Tracy 10-yard pass from Brett Gabbert (Dom Dzioban kick) (Drive: 7 plays, 75 yards, 4:00; Miami (OH) 21-13)

Third quarter

- (8:01) BALL – Justin Bowick 55-yard pass from Kadin Semonza (Cam Pickett rush) (Drive: 4 plays, 70 yards, 0:48; Tied 21-21)

Fourth quarter

- (11:13) MOH – Dom Dzioban 28-yard field goal (Drive: 12 plays, 52 yards, 6:07; Miami (OH) 24-21)
- (1:48) MOH – Dom Dzioban 39-yard field goal (Drive: 9 plays, 24 yards, 4:40; Miami (OH) 27-21)

Statistics	M-OH	BALL
First downs	19	19
Total yards	333	331
Rushing yards	114	51
Passing yards	219	280
Passing: Comp–Att–Int	16–33–1	23–36–2
Time of possession	32:52	27:08

Team	Category	Player	Statistics
Miami (OH)	Passing	Brett Gabbert	16/32, 219 yards, 3 TD
Miami (OH)	Rushing	Keyon Mozee	22 carries, 105 yards
Miami (OH)	Receiving	Reggie Virgil	5 receptions, 101 yards, TD
Ball State	Passing	Kadin Semonza	23/36, 280 yards, TD, 2 INT
Ball State	Rushing	Vaughn Pemberton	5 carries, 21 yards
Ball State	Receiving	Justin Bowick	8 receptions, 171 yards, TD

=== Kent State ===
Game Ten – Kent State Golden Flashes (0–9) at Miami RedHawks (5–4) – Game summary

Quarter	1	2	3	4	Total
Golden Flashes	7	0	0	0	7
RedHawks	10	7	14	3	34

at Yager Stadium, Oxford, Ohio

- Date: Wednesday November 13, 2024
- Game time: 7:00 p.m.
- Game weather: Cloudy • Temperature: 51 °F (11 °C) • Wind: NW 10 miles per hour (16 km/h)
- Game attendance: 5,328
- Referee: Greg Sujack
- TV announcers (ESPNU): Shawn Kenney (play-by-play) and Charlie Strong (analyst)

Game information

First quarter

- (13:40) KENT – Chrison McCray 11-yard pass from Tommy Ulatowski (Will Hryszko kick) (Drive: 3 plays, 25 yards, 1:01; Kent State 7-0)
- (8:09) MOH – Reggie Virgil 69-yard pass from Brett Gabbert (Dom Dzioban kick) (Drive: 1 play, 69 yards, 0:11; Tied 7-7)
- (3:19) MOH – Dom Dzioban 45-yard field goal (Drive: 9 plays, 42 yards, 3:38; Miami Ohio 10-7

Second quarter

- (11:18) MOH – Javon Tracy 34-yard pass from Brett Gabbert (Dom Dzioban kick) (Drive: 3 plays, 77 yards, 1:32; Miami Ohio 17-7)

Third quarter

- (9:52) MOH – Kevin Davis 6-yard run (Dom Dzioban kick) (Drive: 7 plays, 60 yards, 3:56; Miami Ohio 24-7)
- (0:02) MOH – Keyon Mozee 74-yard run (Dom Dzioban kick) (Drive: 2 plays, 75 yards, 0:53; Miami Ohio 31-7)

Fourth quarter

- (11:40) MOH – Dom Dzioban 25-yard field goal (Drive: 5 plays, 15 yards, 3:00; Miami Ohio 34-7)

Statistics	KENT	M-OH
First downs	15	19
Total yards	61–183	61–479
Rushing yards	37–101	39–277
Passing yards	82	202
Passing: Comp–Att–Int	10–24–1	10–22–0
Time of possession	27:23	32:37

Team	Category	Player	Statistics
Kent State	Passing	Tommy Ulatowski	10/21, 82 yards, TD, INT
Kent State	Rushing	Ky Thomas	15 carries, 58 yards
Kent State	Receiving	Luke Floriea	4 receptions, 32 yards
Miami (OH)	Passing	Brett Gabbert	10/22, 202 yards, 2 TD
Miami (OH)	Rushing	Keyon Mozee	19 carries, 196 yards, TD
Miami (OH)	Receiving	Reggie Virgil	2 receptions, 88 yards, TD

=== Northern Illinois ===
Game Eleven – Northern Illinois Huskies (6–4) at Miami RedHawks (6–4) – Game summary

Quarter	1	2	3	4	Total
Huskies	0	3	0	6	9
RedHawks	7	10	0	3	20

at Yager Stadium, Oxford, Ohio

- Date: Tuesday November 19, 2024
- Game time: 7:00 p.m. CDT/8:00 p.m. EDT
- Game weather: Fog • Temperature: 55 °F (13 °C) • Wind: NW 1 mile per hour (1.6 km/h)
- Game attendance: 5,891
- Referee: William Williams
- TV announcers (ESPN): Matt Schumacker (play-by-play) and Dustin Fox (analyst)

Game information

First quarter

- (2:31) MIA – Dylan Downing 2-yard run, Dom Dzioban kick (Drive: 5 plays, 69 yards, 3:05; Miami (OH) 7–0)

Second quarter

- (12:24) MIA – Dom Dzioban 22-yard field goal (Drive: 7 plays, 73 yards, 2:22; Miami (OH) 10–0)
- (3:50) MIA – Reggie Virgil 30-yard pass from Javon Tracy, Dom Dzioban kick (Drive: 6 plays, 87 yards, 3:01; Miami (OH) 17–0)
- (0:04) NIU – Kanon Woodill 47-yard field goal (Drive: 4 plays, 1 yard, 1:41; Miami (OH) 17–3)

Third quarter

No scoring plays

Fourth quarter

- (11:51) NIU – Telly Johnson Jr. 2-yard run (Drive: 9 plays, 61 yards, 4:07; Miami (OH) 17–9)
- (2:25) MIA – Dom Dzioban 27-yard field goal (Drive: 7 plays, 16 yards, 3:21; Miami (OH) 20–9)

Statistics	NIU	M-OH
First downs	19	17
Total yards	242	324
Rushing yards	128	87
Passing yards	114	237
Passing: Comp–Att–Int	17–35–1	15–24–1
Time of possession	32:56	27:04

Team	Category	Player	Statistics
Northern Illinois	Passing	Ethan Hampton	10/25, 70 yards, INT
Northern Illinois	Rushing	Telly Johnson Jr.	15 carries, 47 yards, TD
Northern Illinois	Receiving	Andrew McElroy	5 receptions, 38 yards
Miami (OH)	Passing	Brett Gabbert	14/23, 207 yards, INT
Miami (OH)	Rushing	Keyon Mozee	14 carries, 91 yards
Miami (OH)	Receiving	Reggie Virgil	4 receptions, 107 yards, TD

=== at Bowling Green ===
Game Twelve – Miami RedHawks (7–4) vs Bowling Green Falcons (7–4) – Game summary

Quarter	1	2	3	4	Total
RedHawks	7	7	0	14	28
Falcons	0	5	0	7	12

at Doyt Perry Stadium, Bowling Green, Ohio

- Date: Friday November 29, 2024
- Game time: 12:00 p.m.
- Game weather: Cloudy • Temperature: 16 °F (−9 °C) • Wind: W at 20 miles per hour (32 km/h)
- Game attendance: 9,345
- Referee: Jeremy Valentine
- TV announcers (ESPNU): Noah Reed (play-by-play) and Craig Haubert (analyst)

Game information

First quarter

- (6:44) M-OH – Cade McDonald 30-yard pass from Brett Gabbert (Dom Dzioban kick) (Drive: 1 play, 30 yards, :05; Miami Ohio 7-0)

Second quarter

- (12:14) BGSU – Patrick Day safety (Miami Ohio 7-2)
- (7:47) BGSU – Zach Long 41-yard field goal (Drive: 10 plays, 49 yards, 4:26; Miami Ohio 7-5)
- (2:40) M-OH – Reginald Virgil 20-yard pass from Brett Gabbert (Dom Dzioban kick) (Drive: 8 plays, 82 yards, 5:01; Miami Ohio 14-5)

Third quarter

No scoring plays

Fourth quarter

- (11:35) BGSU – Jaison Patterson 2-yard run (Zach Long kick) (Drive: 11 plays, 92 yards, 5:30; Miami Ohio 14-12)
- (10:35) M-OH – Javon Tracy 72-yard pass from Brett Gabbert (Dom Dzioban kick) (Drive: 2 plays, 72 yards, :54; Miami Ohio 21-12)
- (1:52) M-OH – Keyon Mozee 27-yard run (Dom Dzioban kick) (Drive: 2 plays, 29 yards, :36; Miami Ohio 28-12)

Statistics	M-OH	BGSU
First downs	16	16
Total yards	372	261
Rushing yards	117	51
Passing yards	255	210
Passing: Comp–Att–Int	18–28–2	27–42–1
Time of possession	30:07	29:53

Team	Category	Player	Statistics
Miami (OH)	Passing	Brett Gabbert	18/28, 255 yards, 3 TD, 2 INT
Miami (OH)	Rushing	Keyon Mozee	18 carries, 108 yards, TD
Miami (OH)	Receiving	Javon Tracy	3 receptions, 91 yards, TD
Bowling Green	Passing	Connor Bazelak	26/41, 201 yards, INT
Bowling Green	Rushing	Jamal Johnson	3 carries, 36 yards
Bowling Green	Receiving	Malcolm Johnson Jr.	8 receptions, 75 yards

=== Ohio (MAC Championship / rivalry) ===
Game Thirteen – Ohio Bobcats (9–3) vs Miami RedHawks (8–4) – Game summary

Quarter	1	2	3	4	Total
Bobcats	7	14	10	7	38
RedHawks	3	0	0	0	3

at Ford Field, Detroit, Michigan

- Date: Saturday December 7, 2024
- Game time: 12:00 p.m.
- Game weather: Indoor
- Game attendance: 15,478
- Referee: Andrew Speciale
- TV announcers (ESPN): Anish Shroff (play-by-play), Andre Ware (analyst), and Paul Carcaterra (sideline)

Game information

First quarter

- (8:53) M-OH – Dom Dzioban 29-yard field goal, Drive: 11 plays, 64 yards, 6:07; M-OH 3–0
- (3:16) OHIO – Parker Navarro 4-yard run (Gianni Spetic kick), Drive: 11 plays, 75 yards, 5:37; OHIO 7–3

Second quarter

- (5:29) OHIO – Parker Navarro 1-yard run (Gianni Spetic kick), Drive: 18 plays, 82 yards, 10:14; OHIO 14–3
- (0:52) OHIO – Mason Williams 21-yard pass from Parker Navarro (Gianni Spetic kick), Drive: 10 plays, 75 yards, 3:27; OHIO 21–3

Third quarter

- (12:39) OHIO – Coleman Owen 25-yard pass from Parker Navarro (Gianni Spetic kick), Drive: 6 plays, 75 yards, 2:21; OHIO 28–3
- (3:35) OHIO – Gianni Spetic 53-yard field goal, Drive: 11 plays, 31 yards, 6:40; OHIO 31–3

Fourth quarter

- (6:45) OHIO – Anthony Tyus III 21-yard run (Gianni Spetic kick), Drive: 9 plays, 80 yards, 5:37; OHIO 38–7

Statistics	OHIO	M-OH
First downs	32	11
Total yards	468	190
Rushing yards	233	127
Passing yards	235	1127
Passing: Comp–Att–Int	20–27–0	14–25–1
Time of possession	37:35	22:25

Team	Category	Player	Statistics
Ohio	Passing	Parker Navarro	20/27, 235 yards, 2 TD
Ohio	Rushing	Anthony Tyus III	27 carries, 151 yards, TD
Ohio	Receiving	Coleman Owen	5 receptions, 73 yards, TD
Miami (OH)	Passing	Brett Gabbert	14/25, 127 yards, INT
Miami (OH)	Rushing	Keyon Mozee	11 carries, 28 yards
Miami (OH)	Receiving	Javon Tracy	7 receptions, 58 yards

=== Colorado State (Arizona Bowl) ===
2024 Arizona Bowl
Miami RedHawks (8–5) vs Colorado State Rams (8–4) – Game summary

Quarter	1	2	3	4	Total
RedHawks	6	3	20	14	43
Rams	3	0	7	7	17

at Arizona Stadium • Tucson, Arizona

- Date: Saturday, December 28, 2024
- Game time: 4:30 p.m. EST
- Game weather: Sunny • Temperature: 70 °F (21 °C)
- Game attendance: 40,076
- Referee: Steven Anderson
- TV announcers (The CW): Thom Brennaman (play-by-play), Max Browne (analyst), and Treavor Scales (sideline)

Game information

First quarter

- (8:15) CSU – Jordan Noyes 21-yard field goal (Drive: 13 plays, 72 yards, 6:45; Colorado State 3–0)
- (3:35) M-OH – Dom Dzioban 34-yard field goal (Drive: 5 plays, 18 yards, 1:39; Tied 3–3)
- (0:08) M-OH – Dom Dzioban 26-yard field goal (Drive: 4 plays, 3 yards, 0:53; Miami (OH) 6–3)

Second quarter

- (0:12) M-OH – Dom Dzioban 24-yard field goal (Drive: 9 plays, 55 yards, 2:20; Miami (OH) 9–3)

Third quarter

- (12:35) M-OH – Kevin Davis 4-yard run, Dom Dzioban kick (Drive: 6 plays, 75 yards, 2:25; Miami (OH) 16–3)
- (10:26) M-OH – Brett Gabbert 10-yard run, 2-point pass conversion failed (Drive: 5 plays, 47 yards, 1:57; Miami (OH) 22–3)
- (6:46) M-OH – Kevin Davis 97-yard run, Dom Dzioban kick (Drive: 1 play, 97 yards, 0:14; Miami (OH) 29–3)
- (3:13) CSU – Stephon Daily 56-yard pass from Brayden Fowler-Nicolosi, Jordan Noyes kick (Drive: 7 plays, 75 yards, 3:33; CSU 29–10)

Fourth quarter

- (13:30) M-OH – Jordan Brunson 2-yard run, Dom Dzioban kick (Drive: 3 play, 5 yards, 1:30; Miami (OH) 36–10)
- (9:02) CSU – Peter Montini 1-yard run, Jordan Noyes kick (Drive: 5 plays, 22 yards, 2:12; Miami (OH) 36–17)
- (2:16) M-OH – Jordan Brunson 12-yard run, Dom Dzioban kick (Drive: 10 plays, 40 yards, 6:46; Miami (OH) 43–17)

Statistics	M-OH	CSU
First downs	18	19
Total yards	401	462
Rushing yards	217	141
Passing yards	184	321
Passing: Comp–Att–Int	13–25–0	23–45–2
Time of possession	27:16	32:44

Team	Category	Player	Statistics
Miami (OH)	Passing	Brett Gabbert	13/25, 184 yards
Miami (OH)	Rushing	Kevin Davis	9 carries, 148 yards, 2 TD
Miami (OH)	Receiving	Kam Perry	2 receptions, 57 yards
Colorado State	Passing	Brayden Fowler-Nicolosi	23/45, 321 yards, TD, 2 INT
Colorado State	Rushing	Justin Marshall	9 carries, 84 yards
Colorado State	Receiving	Stephon Daily	4 receptions, 74 yards, TD
