= 2024 Central Michigan Chippewas football team =

American college football season

2024 Central Michigan Chippewas football
- Conference: Mid-American Conference
- Record: 4–8 (2–6 MAC)
- Head coach: Jim McElwain (6th season)
- Offensive scheme: Multiple
- Defensive coordinator: Robb Akey (6th season)
- Base defense: 4–3
- Home stadium: Kelly/Shorts Stadium

2024 Mid-American Conference football standings
	Conf.			Overall
Team	W		L	W		L
Ohio y$	7	–	1	11	–	3
Miami (OH) y	7	–	1	9	–	5
Buffalo	6	–	2	9	–	4
Bowling Green	6	–	2	7	–	6
Western Michigan	5	–	3	6	–	7
Toledo	4	–	4	8	–	5
Northern Illinois	4	–	4	8	–	5
Akron	3	–	5	4	–	8
Eastern Michigan	2	–	6	5	–	7
Central Michigan	2	–	6	4	–	8
Ball State	2	–	6	3	–	9
Kent State	0	–	8	0	–	12
Championship: Ohio 38, Miami (OH) 3
$ – Conference champion; y – Championship game participant

The 2024 Central Michigan Chippewas football team represented Central Michigan University in the Mid-American Conference during the 2024 NCAA Division I FBS football season. The Chippewas were led by Jim McElwain in his sixth and final year as the head coach before announcing his retirement at the end of the season. The Chippewas played their home games at Kelly/Shorts Stadium, located in Mount Pleasant, Michigan.

== Preseason ==
=== Preseason poll ===
On July 19 the MAC announced the preseason coaches poll. Central Michigan was picked to finish eighth in the conference. The Chippewas received zero votes to win the MAC Championship.

== Schedule ==
Date	Time	Opponent	Site	TV	Result	Attendance
August 29	7:00 p.m.	Central Connecticut*	Kelly/Shorts Stadium; Mount Pleasant, MI	ESPN+	W 66–10	18,055
September 7	6:00 p.m.	at FIU*	Pitbull Stadium; Miami, FL	ESPN+	L 16–52	17,852
September 14	12:00 p.m.	at Illinois*	Memorial Stadium; Champaign, IL	Peacock	L 9–30	51,498
September 21	1:00 p.m.	Ball State	Kelly/Shorts Stadium; Mount Pleasant, MI	ESPN+	W 37–34	18,011
September 28	3:30 p.m.	San Diego State*	Kelly/Shorts Stadium; Mount Pleasant, MI	CBSSN	W 22–21	27,072
October 12	4:00 p.m.	Ohio^{†}	Kelly/Shorts Stadium; Mount Pleasant, MI	ESPNU	L 25–27	22,437
October 19	2:00 p.m.	at Eastern Michigan	Rynearson Stadium; Ypsilanti, MI (rivalry)	ESPN+	L 34–38	17,974
October 26	2:00 p.m.	at Miami (OH)	Yager Stadium; Oxford, OH	ESPN+	L 7–46	10,661
November 5	7:30 p.m.	Bowling Green	Kelly/Shorts Stadium; Mount Pleasant, MI	ESPN2	L 13–23	7,832
November 12	7:00 p.m.	at Toledo	Glass Bowl; Toledo, OH	ESPNU	L 10–37	14,661
November 19	7:30 p.m.	Western Michigan	Kelly/Shorts Stadium; Mount Pleasant, MI (rivalry)	ESPN2	W 16–14	13,102
November 30	3:30 p.m.	at Northern Illinois	Huskie Stadium; DeKalb, IL	CBSSN	L 16–24	5,843
*Non-conference game; ^{†}Homecoming; All times are in Eastern time

== Game summaries ==
=== vs. Central Connecticut State (FCS) ===
Game One – Central Connecticut Blue Devils (FCS) (0-0) at Central Michigan Chippewas (0-0) – Game summary

Quarter	1	2	3	4	Total
Blue Devils (FCS)	7	0	3	0	10
Chippewas	14	28	24	0	66

at Kelly/Shorts Stadium • Mount Pleasant, MI

- Date: Thursday, August 29, 2024
- Game time: 7:00 PM
- Game attendance: 18,055
- Referee: Billy Williams
- TV announcers (ESPN+): Dan Gutowsky (play-by-play) and Randy Buffington (analyst)

Game information

First quarter

- (10:31) CMU – Myles Bailey 7-yard run (Tristan Mattson kick) (Drive: 8 plays, 79 yards, 4:04; Central Michigan 7-0)
- (5:55) CCSU – Elijah Howard 3-yard run (Jack Barnum kick) (Drive: 10 plays, 75 yards, 4:37; Tied 7-7)
- (5:40) CMU – Stephan Bracey Jr. 87-yard kickoff return (Tristan Mattson kick) (Central Michigan 14-7)

Second quarter

- (11:50) CMU – B.J. Harris 9-yard run (Tristan Mattson kick) (Drive: 3 plays, 46 yards, 1:33; Central Michigan 21-7)
- (7:34) CMU – Evan Boyd 47-yard pass from Joe Labas (Tristan Mattson kick) (Drive: 2 plays, 80 yards, 0:50; Central Michigan 28-7)
- (3:16) CMU – Solomon Davis 17-yard pass from Joe Labas (Tristan Mattson kick) (Drive: 5 plays, 37 yards, 2:57; Central Michigan 35-7)
- (0:37) CMU – Myles Bailey 2-yard run (Tristan Mattson kick) (Drive: 8 plays, 55 yards, 1:45; Central Michigan 42-7)

Third quarter

- (11:17) CCSU – Jack Barnum 50-yard field goal (Drive: 10 plays, 42 yards, 3:43; Central Michigan 42-10)
- (8:45) CMU – Tristan Mattson 26-yard field goal (Drive: 6 plays, 69 yards, 2:28; Central Michigan 45-10)
- (7:04) CMU – Donte Kent 68-yard punt return (Tristan Mattson kick) (Central Michigan 52-10)
- (3:45) CMU – Solomon Davis 72-yard pass from Joe Labas (Tristan Mattson kick) (Drive: 3 plays, 86 yards, 1:00; Central Michigan 59-10)
- (1:48) CMU – Aakeem Snell 46-yard interception return (Tristan Mattson kick) (Central Michigan 66-10)

Fourth quarter

- no scoring

Statistics	CCSU	CMU
First downs	16	22
Total yards	67–285	52–491
Rushing yards	44–194	24–113
Passing yards	91	378
Passing: Comp–Att–Int	12–23–1	21–28–0
Time of possession	34:57	25:03

Team	Category	Player	Statistics
Central Connecticut	Passing	Brady Olson	12/20, 91 yards
Central Connecticut	Rushing	Jadon Turner	5 carries, 61 yards
Central Connecticut	Receiving	Michael Plaskon	4 receptions, 44 yards
Central Michigan	Passing	Joe Labas	18/24, 342 yards, 3 TD
Central Michigan	Rushing	Myles Bailey	9 carries, 68 yards, 2 TD
Central Michigan	Receiving	Solomon Davis	4 receptions, 109 yards, 2 TD

=== at FIU ===
Game Two - Central Michigan Chippewas (1-0) at FIU Panthers (0-1) - Game Summary

Quarter	1	2	3	4	Total
Chippewas	0	8	8	0	16
Panthers	7	21	8	16	52

at Pitbull Stadium

- Date: Saturday, September 7th, 2024
- Game time: 6:00 PM
- Game weather: Sunny, 89 °F (32 °C)
- Game attendance: 17,852
- TV: ESPN+
- Box Score Gamebook

Game information
First quarter
- FIU – Keyone Jenkins 4-yard run (Chase Gabriel kick), 6:55. FIU 7–0. Drive: 4 plays, 33 yards, 1:59.

Second quarter

- FIU – Eric Rivers 36-yard pass from Keyone Jenkins (Chase Gabriel kick), 7:45. FIU 14–0. Drive: 3 plays, 72 yards, 1:21.
- FIU – Nazeviah Burris 17-yard pass from Keyone Jenkins (Chase Gabriel kick), 2:18. FIU 21–0. Drive: 6 plays, 43 yards, 3:23.
- FIU – Brian Blades II 21-yard interception return (Chase Gabriel kick), 1:54. FIU 28–0.
- CMU – Gavin Harris 12-yard pass from Joe Labas (Evan Boyd pass), 0:14. FIU 28–8. Drive: 9 plays, 58 yards, 1:35.

Third quarter

- FIU – Kejon Owens 26-yard run (Dean Patterson pass), 6:04. FIU 36–8. Drive: 2 plays, 36 yards, 0:30.
- CMU – Chris Parker 44-yard pass from Joe Labas (Gavin Harris pass), 0:39. FIU 36–16. Drive: 5 plays, 71 yards, 2:22.

Fourth quarter

- FIU – Lexington Joseph 35-yard run, 12:39. FIU 42–16. Drive: 7 plays, 75 yards, 3:00.
- FIU – Chase Gabriel 42-yard field goal, 6:32. FIU 45–16. Drive: 6 plays, 21 yards, 3:35.
- FIU – Luby Maurice Jr. 15-yard run (Chase Gabriel kick), 2:28. FIU 52–16. Drive: 2 plays, 9 yards, 0:52.

Statistics	CMU	FIU
First downs	22	15
Total yards	369	309
Rushing yards	179	185
Passing yards	190	124
Passing: Comp–Att–Int	23-44-5	10-18-0
Time of possession	34:18	25:42

Team	Category	Player	Statistics
Central Michigan	Passing	Joe Labas	151 yards, 2 TD, 5 INT
Central Michigan	Rushing	Myles Bailey	54 yards
Central Michigan	Receiving	Chris Parker	55 yards, TD
FIU	Passing	Keyone Jenkins	124 yards, 2 TD
FIU	Rushing	Kejon Owens	60 yards, TD
FIU	Receiving	Josiah Miamen	54 yards

=== at Illinois ===
Game Three – Central Michigan Chippewas (1-1) vs Illinois Fighting Illini (2-0) – Game summary

Quarter	1	2	3	4	Total
Chippewas	3	3	0	3	9
Fighting Illini	7	6	10	7	30

at Memorial Stadium • Champaign, Illinois

- Date: September 14
- Game time: 12:00 p.m.
- Game weather: 79 °F (26 °C), sunny
- Game attendance: 51,498
- Referee: Kole Knueppel
- TV announcers (Peacock): Jac Collinsworth (play-by-play), Michael Robinson (analyst), and Caroline Pineda (sideline reporter)

Game information

First quarter

- ILL – Pat Bryant 11-yard pass from Luke Altmyer (David Olano kick), 7:05. Illinois 7–0. Drive: 12 plays, 59 yards, 6:25.
- CMU – Tristan Mattson 32-yard field goal, 1:58. Illinois 7–3. Drive: 10 plays, 61 yards, 5:07.

Second quarter

- ILL – David Olano 49-yard field goal, 1:55. Illinois 10–3. Drive: 6 plays, 26 yards, 2:53.
- CMU – Tristan Mattson 29-yard field goal, 0:36. Illinois 10–6. Drive: 10 plays, 64 yards, 1:19.
- ILL – Ethan Moczulski 59-yard field goal, 0:00. Illinois 13–6. Drive: 5 plays, 34 yards, 0:36.

Third quarter

- ILL – Pat Bryant 20-yard pass from Luke Altmyer (David Olano kick), 13:05. Illinois 20–6. Drive: 4 plays, 75 yards, 1:55.
- ILL – David Olano 34-yard field goal, 4:43. Illinois 23–6. Drive: 10 plays, 62 yards, 4:29.

Fourth quarter

- CMU – Tristan Mattson 25-yard field goal, 11:58. Illinois 23–9. Drive: 12 plays, 59 yards, 3:59.
- ILL – Kadin Feagin 2-yard run (David Olano kick), 9:34. Illinois 30–9. Drive: 4 plays, 46 yards, 2:23.

Statistics	CMU	ILL
First downs	19	20
Total yards	62–309	58–379
Rushing yards	33–142	29–137
Passing yards	167	242
Passing: Comp–Att–Int	15–29–1	19–29–0
Time of possession	20:03	30:57

Team	Category	Player	Statistics
Central Michigan	Passing	Joe Labas	12/25, 125 yards, 1 INT
Central Michigan	Rushing	Myles Bailey	6 carries, 49 yards
Central Michigan	Receiving	Evan Boyd	3 receptions, 38 yards
Illinois	Passing	Luke Altmyer	19/29, 242 yards, 2 TD
Illinois	Rushing	Josh McCray	8 carries, 54 yards
Illinois	Receiving	Pat Bryant	7 receptions, 102 yards, 2 TD

=== vs. Ball State ===
Game Four – Ball State Cardinals (1–1) at Central Michigan Chippewas (1–2) – Game summary

Quarter	1	2	3	4	Total
Cardinals	10	7	7	10	34
Chippewas	0	23	0	14	37

at Kelly/Shorts Stadium, Mount Pleasant, Michigan

- Date: September 21, 2024
- Game time: 1:00pm
- Game weather: Sunny, 79 °F (26 °C), W 3 mph
- Game attendance: 18,011
- Referee: Matt Packowski
- TV announcers (ESPN+): Michael Reghi (play-by-play) and Marcus Ray (analyst)

Game information

First quarter

- BALL – Carson Holmer 31-yard field goal, 7:21. Ball State 3–0. Drive: 10 plays, 53 yards, 4:23.
- BALL – Qian Magwood 6-yard pass from Kadin Semonza (Carson Holmer kick), 0:37. Ball State 10–0. Drive: 7 plays, 63 yards, 3:26.

Second quarter

- CMU – Bert Emanuel Jr. 20-yard run (Tristan Mattson kick), 10:00. Ball State 10–7. Drive: 3 plays, 62 yards, 1:18.
- CMU – Chris Parker 7-yard pass from Bert Emanuel Jr. (Tristan Mattson kick), 5:37. Central Michigan 14–10. Drive: 3 plays, 80 yards, 1:33.
- CMU – Marion Lukes 2-yard run (PAT blocked), 1:43. Central Michigan 20–10. Drive: 6 plays, 41 yards, 1:49.
- BALL – Malcolm Gillie 23-yard pass from Kadin Semonza (Carson Holmer kick), 0:20. Central Michigan 20–17. Drive: 9 plays, 75 yards, 1:23.
- CMU – Tristan Mattson 33-yard field goal, 0:00. Central Michigan 23–17. Drive: 3 plays, 60 yards, 0:20.

Third quarter

- BALL – Braedon Sloan 22-yard run (Carson Holmer kick), 8:56. Ball State 24–23. Drive: 11 plays, 75 yards, 6:04.

Fourth quarter

- BALL – Carson Holmer 40-yard field goal, 8:39. Ball State 27–23. Drive: 8 plays, 38 yards, 4:05.
- CMU – Bert Emanuel Jr. 16-yard run (Tristan Mattson kick), 5:02. Central Michigan 30-27. Drive: 9 plays, 75 yards, 3:37.
- BALL – Tanner Koziol 16-yard pass from Kadin Semonza (Carson Holmer kick), 0:53. Ball State 34–30. Drive: 5 plays, 97 yards, 1:06.
- CMU – Chris Parker 20-yard pass from Joe Labas (Tristan Mattson kick), 0:16. Central Michigan 37–34. Drive: 5 plays, 75 yards, 0:37.

Statistics	BALL	CMU
First downs	27	19
Total yards	431	527
Rushing yards	146	335
Passing yards	285	192
Passing: Comp–Att–Int	30-40-0	15-21-0
Time of possession	36:40	23:20

Team	Category	Player	Statistics
Ball State	Passing	Kadin Semonza	30/40, 285 yards, 3 TD
Ball State	Rushing	Braedon Sloan	19 carries, 94 yards, TD
Ball State	Receiving	Tanner Koziol	9 receptions, 112 yards, TD
Central Michigan	Passing	Joe Labas	14/20, 185 yards, TD
Central Michigan	Rushing	B.J. Harris	8 carries, 151 yards
Central Michigan	Receiving	Chris Parker	5 receptions, 79 yards, 2 TD

=== vs. San Diego State ===
Game Five – San Diego State Aztecs (1–2) at Central Michigan Chippewas (2–2) – Game summary

Quarter	1	2	3	4	Total
Aztecs	7	14	0	0	21
Chippewas	10	3	6	3	22

at Kelly/Shorts Stadium, Mount Pleasant, Michigan

- Date: September 28, 2024
- Game time: 3:30pm EDT
- TV announcers (CBSSN): Chris Lewis (play-by-play) and Taylor McHargue (analyst)

Game information

First quarter

- CMU – Tristan Mattson 25-yard field goal, 12:26. Central Michigan 3–0. Drive: 6 plays, 61 yards, 2:28.
- SDSU – Marquez Cooper 3-yard run (Nick Lopez kick), 6:13. San Diego State 7–3. Drive: 6 plays, 75 yards, 1:56.
- CMU – Marion Lukes 8-yard pass from Joe Labas (Tristan Mattson kick), 0:31. Central Michigan 10–7. Drive: 12 plays, 75 yards, 5:42.

Second quarter

- SDSU – Jude Wolfe 5-yard pass from Danny O'Neil (Nick Lopez kick), 12:43. San Diego State 14–10. Drive: 4 plays, 17 yards, 1:07.
- SDSU – Jude Wolfe 26-yard pass from Danny O'Neil (Nick Lopez kick), 3:30. San Diego State 21–10. Drive: 3 plays, 73 yards, 0:53.
- CMU – Tristan Mattson 34-yard field goal, 0:26. San Diego State 21–13. Drive: 12 plays, 59 yards, 3:04.

Third quarter

- CMU – B.J. Harris 1-yard run (2-point conversion failed), 5:52. San Diego State 21-19. Drive: 15 plays, 77 yards, 7:29.

Fourth quarter

- CMU – Tristan Mattson 46-yard field goal, 0:05. Central Michigan 22–21. Drive: 15 plays, 52 yards, 1:51.

Statistics	SDSU	CMU
First downs	21	26
Total yards	364	452
Rushing yards	118	154
Passing yards	246	298
Passing: Comp–Att–Int	14-23-0	25-46-1
Time of possession	24:33	35:27

Team	Category	Player	Statistics
San Diego State	Passing	Danny O'Neil	14/23, 246 yards, 2 TD
San Diego State	Rushing	Marquez Cooper	34 carries, 111 yards, TD
San Diego State	Receiving	Louis Brown IV	8 receptions, 149 yards
Central Michigan	Passing	Joe Labas	24/43, 275 yards, TD, INT
Central Michigan	Rushing	Marion Lukes	16 carries, 76 yards
Central Michigan	Receiving	Gavin Harris	2 receptions, 66 yards

=== vs. Ohio ===
Game Six – Ohio Bobcats (3–2) at Central Michigan Chippewas (3–2) – Game summary

Quarter	1	2	3	4	Total
Bobcats	3	21	0	3	27
Chippewas	0	0	8	17	25

at Kelly/Shorts Stadium • Mount Pleasant, MI

- Date: October 12
- Game time: 4:00 p.m.
- Game weather: Sunny • Temperature: 62 °F (17 °C) • Wind: SE 3 mph
- Game attendance: 22,437
- Referee: Rich Edwards
- TV announcers (ESPNU): Matt Schumacker (play-by-play) and Dustin Fox (analyst)

Game information

First quarter

- OHIO – Gianni Spetic 35-yard field goal, 11:53. Ohio 3–0. Drive: 5 plays, 57 yards, 3:07.

Second quarter

- OHIO – Parker Navarro 8-yard run (Gianni Spetic kick), 10:03. Ohio 10–0. Drive: 9 plays, 75 yards, 4:15.
- OHIO – Coleman Owen 20-yard pass from Parker Navarro (Gianni Spetic kick), 3:11. Ohio 17–0. Drive: 7 plays, 55 yards, 3:27.
- OHIO – Duncan Brune 4-yard run (Gianni Spetic), 1:01. Ohio 24–0. Drive: 5 plays, 70 yards, 0:53.

Third quarter

- CMU – Marion Lukes 3-yard run (Tyler Jefferson pass to Marion Lukes for 2-point conversion), 8:19. Ohio 24-8. Drive: 8 plays, 67 yards, 4:37.

Fourth quarter

- CMU – Tristan Mattson 37-yard field goal, 14:57. Ohio 24–11. Drive: 9 plays, 56 yards, 5:30.
- CMU – Marion Lukes 4-yard run (Tristan Mattson kick), 14:57. Ohio 24–18. Drive: 3 plays, 15 yards, 1:14.
- OHIO – Gianni Spetic 46-yard field goal, 5:17. Ohio 27–18. Drive: 7 plays, 47 yards, 3:43.
- CMU – Marion Lukes 28-yard run (Tristan Mattson kick), 1:52. Ohio 27–25. Drive: 11 plays, 75 yards, 3:25.

Statistics	OHIO	CMU
First downs	18	16
Total yards	424	292
Rushing yards	277	161
Passing yards	147	131
Passing: Comp–Att–Int	13-22-0	14-22-0
Time of possession	29:31	30:29

Team	Category	Player	Statistics
Ohio	Passing	Parker Navarro	13/22, 147 yards, TD
Ohio	Rushing	Parker Navarro	14 carries, 176 yards, TD
Ohio	Receiving	Chase Hendricks	2 receptions, 74 yards
Central Michigan	Passing	Tyler Jefferson	8/13, 95 yards
Central Michigan	Rushing	Marion Lukes	20 carries, 110 yards, 3 TD
Central Michigan	Receiving	Chris Parker	3 receptions, 33 yards

=== at Eastern Michigan (rivalry) ===
Game Seven – Central Michigan Chippewas (3–3) vs Eastern Michigan Eagles (4–2) – Game summary

Quarter	1	2	3	4	Total
Chippewas	0	14	13	7	34
Eagles	10	6	0	22	38

at Rynearson Stadium, Ypsilanti, MI

- Date: Saturday October 19, 2024
- Game time: 2:00 p.m.
- TV announcers (ESPN+): Michael Reghi (play-by-play) and Marcus Ray (analyst)

Game information

First quarter

- EMU – Markus Allen 15-yard pass from Cole Snyder (Jesus Gomez kick), 11:13. Eastern Michigan 7–0. Drive: 5 plays, 67 yards, 1:21.
- EMU – Jesus Gomez 22-yard field goal, 2:18. Eastern Michigan 10–0. Drive: 14 plays, 86 yards, 5:18.

Second quarter

- EMU – Jesus Gomez 41-yard field goal, 7:57. Eastern Michigan 13–0. Drive: 14 plays, 49 yards, 7:47.
- CMU – Evan Boyd 22-yard pass from Bert Emanuel Jr. (Tristan Mattson kick), 1:41. Eastern Michigan 13–7. Drive: 7 plays, 73 yards, 2:34.
- CMU – Jason Williams 67-yard fumble return (Tristan Mattson kick), 1:00. Central Michigan 14–13.
- EMU – Jesus Gomez 48-yard field goal, 0:00. Eastern Michigan 16–14. Drive: 8 plays, 43 yards, 0:50.

Third quarter

- CMU – Bert Emanuel Jr. 2-yard run (Tristan Mattson kick), 14:10. Central Michigan 21-16. Drive: 2 plays, 68 yards, 0:45.
- CMU – Tristan Mattson 56-yard field goal, 7:29. Central Michigan 24–16. Drive: 8 plays, 47 yards, 3:58.
- CMU – Tristan Mattson 51-yard field goal, 2:09. Central Michigan 27–16. Drive: 6 plays, 35 yards, 3:42.

Fourth quarter

- CMU – Gavin Harris 2-yard run (Tristan Mattson kick), 13:26. Central Michigan 34–16. Drive: 5 plays, 77 yards, 2:27.
- EMU – Terry Lockett Jr. 49-yard pass from Cole Snyder (Cole Snyder pass to Joey Mattord for 2-point conversion), 10:54. Central Michigan 34–24. Drive: 8 plays, 75 yards, 2:32.
- EMU – Terry Lockett Jr. 30-yard pass from Cole Snyder (Jesus Gomez kick), 7:19. Central Michigan 34–31. Drive: 3 plays, 45 yards, 1:08.
- EMU – Cole Snyder 1-yard run (Jesus Gomez kick), 1:42. Eastern Michigan 38–34. Drive: 7 plays, 62 yards, 2:12.

Statistics	CMU	EMU
First downs	20	23
Total yards	383	450
Rushing yards	285	150
Passing yards	98	300
Passing: Comp–Att–Int	5-12-0	17-38-1
Time of possession	29:07	30:53

Team	Category	Player	Statistics
Central Michigan	Passing	Bert Emanuel Jr.	3/4, 92 yards, TD
Central Michigan	Rushing	Marion Lukes	13 carries, 118 yards
Central Michigan	Receiving	Solomon Davis	1 reception, 48 yards
Eastern Michigan	Passing	Cole Snyder	17/38, 300 yards, 3 TD, INT
Eastern Michigan	Rushing	Delbert Mimms III	21 carries, 90 yards
Eastern Michigan	Receiving	Markus Allen	7 receptions, 140 yards, TD

=== at Miami (OH) ===
Game Eight – Central Michigan Chippewas (3–4) at Miami RedHawks (3–4) – Game summary

Quarter	1	2	3	4	Total
Chippewas	7	0	0	0	7
RedHawks	3	13	10	20	46

at Yager Stadium, Oxford, OH

- Date: Saturday October 26, 2024
- Game time: 2:00 PM EST
- TV announcers (ESPN+): Doug Sherman (play-by-play) and Forrest Conoly (analyst)

Game information

First quarter

- M-OH – Dom Dzioban 31-yard field goal, 10:02. Miami (OH) 3–0. Drive: 8 plays, 65 yards, 4:48.
- CMU – Myles Bailey 2-yard run (Tristan Mattson kick), 1:59. Central Michigan 7–3. Drive: 15 plays, 75 yards, 8:03.

Second quarter

- M-OH – Reggie Virgil 9-yard pass from Henry Hesson (Dom Dzioban kick), 14:49. Miami (OH) 10–7. Drive: 5 plays, 75 yards, 2:10.
- M-OH – Dom Dzioban 22-yard field goal, 6:29. Miami (OH) 13–7. Drive: 12 plays, 46 yards, 5:33.
- M-OH – Dom Dzioban 23-yard field goal, 0:01. Miami (OH) 16–7. Drive: 10 plays, 67 yards, 1:55.

Third quarter

- M-OH – Dom Dzioban 51-yard field goal, 9:19. Miami (OH) 19–7. Drive: 7 plays, 15 yards, 3:48.
- M-OH – Javon Tracy 36-yard pass from Brett Gabbert (Dom Dzioban kick), 6:18. Miami (OH) 26–7. Drive: 3 plays, 63 yards, 1:16.

Fourth quarter

- M-OH – Dom Dzioban 44-yard field goal, 13:25. Miami (OH) 29–7. Drive: 8 plays, 25 yards, 3:56.
- M-OH – Kevin Davis 2-yard run (Dom Dzioban kick), 11:19. Miami (OH) 36–7. Drive: 3 plays, 70 yards, 1:34.
- M-OH – Jordan Brunson 3-yard run (Kellan McLaughlin kick), 6:48. Miami (OH) 43–7. Drive: 3 plays, 79 yards, 1:44.
- M-OH – Kellan McLaughlin 41-yard field goal, 0:51. Miami (OH) 46–7. Drive: 8 plays, 6 yards, 5:14.

Statistics	CMU	M-OH
First downs	12	19
Total yards	168	518
Rushing yards	106	277
Passing yards	62	241
Passing: Comp–Att–Int	7-17-1	15-25-0
Time of possession	26:49	33:11

Team	Category	Player	Statistics
Central Michigan	Passing	Tyler Jefferson	7/17, 62 yards, INT
Central Michigan	Rushing	Tyler Jefferson	8 carries, 37 yards
Central Michigan	Receiving	Evan Boyd	2 receptions, 21 yards
Miami (OH)	Passing	Brett Gabbert	10/12, 165 yards, TD
Miami (OH)	Rushing	Keyon Mozee	15 carries, 120 yards
Miami (OH)	Receiving	Javon Tracy	5 receptions, 118 yards, TD

=== Bowling Green ===
Game Nine – Bowling Green Falcons (4–4) at Central Michigan Chippewas (3–5) – Game summary

Quarter	1	2	3	4	Total
Falcons	3	6	7	7	23
Chippewas	0	7	0	6	13

at Kelly/Shorts Stadium • Mount Pleasant, MI

- Date: Tuesday November 5, 2024
- Game time: 7:30 PM EST
- Game weather: Rain • Temperature: 67 °F (19 °C) • Wind: N at 9 miles per hour (14 km/h)
- Game attendance: 7,832
- Referee: Rich Edwards
- TV announcers (ESPN2): Clay Matvick (play-by-play) and Steve Addazio (analyst)

Game information

First quarter

- (9:05) BGSU – Zach Long 32-yard field goal (Drive: 12 plays, 64 yards, 5:49; BGSU 3–0)

Second quarter

- (12:55) BGSU – Zach Long 40-yard field goal (Drive: 9 plays, 59 yards, 5:17; BGSU 6–0)
- (2:28) BGSU – Zach Long 37-yard field goal (Drive: 5 plays, 35 yards, 1:40; BGSU 9–0)
- (0:31) CMU – Tyler Jefferson 1-yard run, Tristan Mattson kick (Drive: 6 plays, 75 yards, 1:57; BGSU 9–7)

Third quarter

- (12:17) BGSU – Levi Gazarek 9-yard pass from Connor Bazelak, Zach Long kick (Drive: 6 plays, 39 yards, 2:27; BGSU 16–7)

Fourth quarter

- (5:42) BGSU – Jaison Patterson 1-yard run, Zach Long kick (Drive: 8 plays, 33 yards, 5:26; BGSU 23–7)
- (1:50) CMU – Jadyn Glasser 1-yard run, Two-point run failed (Drive: 11 plays, 75 yards, 3:52; BGSU 23–13)

Statistics	BGSU	CMU
First downs	19	13
Total yards	388	250
Rushing yards	181	187
Passing yards	207	63
Passing: Comp–Att–Int	19–30–0	6–14–0
Time of possession	35:53	24:07

Team	Category	Player	Statistics
Bowling Green	Passing	Connor Bazelak	19/30, 207 yards, TD
Bowling Green	Rushing	Terion Stewart	20 carries, 117 yards
Bowling Green	Receiving	Harold Fannin Jr.	7 receptions, 86 yards
Central Michigan	Passing	Jadyn Glasser	5/7, 57 yards
Central Michigan	Rushing	Marion Lukes	20 carries, 72 yards
Central Michigan	Receiving	Chris Parker	3 receptions, 25 yards

=== at Toledo ===
Game Ten – Central Michigan Chippewas (3–6) at Toledo Rockets (6–3) – Game summary

Quarter	1	2	3	4	Total
Chippewas	3	0	0	7	10
Rockets	7	20	7	3	37

at Glass Bowl, Toledo, Ohio

- Date: Tuesday November 12, 2024
- Game time: 7:00 PM EST
- Game weather: Sunny • Temperature: 42 °F (6 °C) • Wind: W 2 miles per hour (3.2 km/h)
- Game attendance: 14,661
- Referee: Billy Williams
- TV announcers (ESPNU): Matt Schumacker (play-by-play) and Dustin Fox (analyst)

Game information

First quarter

- (8:29) CMU – Tristan Mattson 34-yard field goal (Drive: 11 plays, 62 yards, 6:25; Central Michigan 3–0)
- (4:26) TOL – Tucker Gleason 9-yard run, Dylan Cunanan kick (Drive: 10 plays, 71 yards, 3:58; Toledo 7–3)

Second quarter

- (12:42) TOL – Dylan Cunanan 30-yard field goal (Drive: 12 plays, 77 yards, 4:27; Toledo 10–3)
- (4:48) TOL – Tucker Gleason 30-yard run, Dylan Cunanan kick (Drive: 7 plays, 75 yards, 2:20; Toledo 17–3)
- (0:22) TOL – Nasir Bowers 45-yard interception, Dylan Cunanan kick (Toledo 24–3)
- (0:00) TOL – Dylan Cunanan 32-yard field goal (Drive: 2 plays, 0 yards, 0:07; Toledo 27–3)

Third quarter

- (7:17) TOL – Zy'marion Lang 27-yard pass from Tucker Gleason, Dylan Cunanan kick (Drive: 7 plays, 60 yards, 2:38; Toledo 34–3)

Fourth quarter

- (9:53) TOL – Dylan Cunanan 40-yard field goal (Drive: 4 plays, -11 yards, 1:59; Toledo 37–3)
- (1:28) CMU – Marion Lukes 2-yard run, Tristan Mattson kick (Drive: 11 plays, 70 yards, 4:07; Toledo 37–10)

Statistics	CMU	TOL
First downs	16	19
Total yards	236	299
Rushing yards	86	159
Passing yards	150	140
Passing: Comp–Att–Int	16–27–2	14–24–0
Time of possession	32:49	27:11

Team	Category	Player	Statistics
Central Michigan	Passing	Jadyn Glasser	16/27, 150 yards, 2 INT
Central Michigan	Rushing	Marion Lukes	19 carries, 80 yards, TD
Central Michigan	Receiving	Chris Parker	5 receptions, 52 yards
Toledo	Passing	Tucker Gleason	13/23, 136 yards, TD
Toledo	Rushing	Tucker Gleason	8 carries, 66 yards, 2 TD
Toledo	Receiving	Jerjuan Newton	3 receptions, 40 yards

=== Western Michigan (rivalry) ===
Game Eleven – Western Michigan Broncos (5–5) at Central Michigan Chippewas (3–7) – Game summary

Quarter	1	2	3	4	Total
Broncos	0	0	7	7	14
Chippewas	7	6	0	3	16

at Kelly/Shorts Stadium • Mount Pleasant, MI

- Date: Tuesday November 19, 2024
- Game time: 7:30 p.m.
- Game weather: Cloudy • Temperature: 54 °F (12 °C) • Wind: SE 3 miles per hour (4.8 km/h)
- Game attendance: 13,102
- Referee: Rich Edwards
- TV announcers (ESPN2): Noah Reed (play-by-play), Craig Haubert (analyst) and Scott Ferrier (sideline)
- Box score

Game information
First quarter
- CMU – Harris, B.J. 6 yd run (Mattson, Tristan kick), 3 plays, 70 yards, TOP 01:33. CMU 7–0.

Second quarter

- CMU – Mattson, Tristan 36 yd field goal, 11 plays, 74 yards, TOP 06:00. CMU 10–0.
- CMU – Mattson, Tristan 47 yd field goal, 5 plays, 28 yards, TOP 00:55. CMU 13–0.

Third quarter

- WMU – Hallock, Tate 78 yd interception return (Zurak, Luka kick). CMU 13–7.

Fourth quarter

- CMU – Mattson, Tristan 30 yd field goal, 17 plays, 50 yards, TOP 10:17. CMU 16–7.
- WMU – Buckley, Jalen 1 yd run (Zurak, Luka kick), 14 plays, 76 yards, TOP 07:34. CMU 16–14.

Statistics	WMU	CMU
First downs	10	16
Total yards	184	307
Rushing yards	50	167
Passing yards	134	140
Passing: Comp–Att–Int	15–26–0	8–17–1
Time of possession	23:43	36:17

Team	Category	Player	Statistics
Western Michigan	Passing	Hayden Wolff	13/23, 126 yards
Western Michigan	Rushing	Jalen Buckley	12 carries, 50 yards, TD
Western Michigan	Receiving	Kenneth Womack	4 receptions, 47 yards
Central Michigan	Passing	Jadyn Glasser	8/17, 140 yards, INT
Central Michigan	Rushing	Marion Lukes	15 carries, 93 yards
Central Michigan	Receiving	Solomon Davis	3 receptions, 73 yards

=== at Northern Illinois ===
Game Twelve – Central Michigan Chippewas (4–7) at Northern Illinois Huskies (6–5) – Game summary

Quarter	1	2	3	4	Total
Chippewas	0	16	0	0	16
Huskies	19	2	3	0	24

at Huskie Stadium, DeKalb, Illinois

- Date: Saturday November 30, 2024
- Game time: 3:30 p.m.
- TV: CBSSN

Game information
First quarter
- NIU – Gavin Williams 24-yard run (2-point conversion pass failed), 10:42. Huskies 6–0. Drive: 6 plays, 66 yards, 2:47.
- NIU – Ethan Hampton 16-yard run (PAT failed), 6:55. Huskies 12–0. Drive: 5 plays, 36 yards, 2:11.
- NIU – Telly Johnson Jr. 4-yard run (Kanon Woodill kick), 2:23. Huskies 19–0. Drive: 4 plays, 66 yards, 2:24.

Second quarter

- CMU – Jesse Prewitt III 3-yard pass from Jadyn Glasser (PAT blocked), 13:44. Huskies 19–6. Drive: 7 plays, 72 yards, 3:34.
- NIU – JaVaughn Byrd defensive PAT conversion, 13:44. Huskies 21–6. Drive: 7 plays, 72 yards, 3:34.
- CMU – Tristan Mattson 40-yard field goal, 6:24. Huskies 21–9. Drive: 10 plays, 34 yards, 5:10.
- CMU – Jesse Prewitt III 6-yard pass from Jadyn Glasser (Tristan Mattson kick), 1:56. Huskies 21–16. Drive: 7 plays, 35 yards, 2:59.

Third quarter

- NIU – Kanon Woodill 26-yard field goal, 6:13. Huskies 24–16. Drive: 17 plays, 66 yards, 8:47.

Fourth quarter

- No scoring plays

Statistics	CMU	NIU
First downs	15	22
Total yards	204	332
Rushing yards	112	163
Passing yards	92	169
Passing: Comp–Att–Int	12-25-1	19-30-0
Time of possession	26:23	33:37

Team	Category	Player	Statistics
Central Michigan	Passing	Jadyn Glasser	12/25, 92 yards, 2 TD, INT
Central Michigan	Rushing	Marion Lukes	13 carries, 78 yards
Central Michigan	Receiving	Jesse Prewitt III	5 receptions, 37 yards, 2 TD
Northern Illinois	Passing	Ethan Hampton	19/30, 169 yards
Northern Illinois	Rushing	Telly Johnson Jr.	20 carries, 84 yards, TD
Northern Illinois	Receiving	Trayvon Rudolph	9 receptions, 97 yards
