= 2024 Eastern Michigan Eagles football team =

American college football season

2024 Eastern Michigan Eagles football
- Conference: Mid-American Conference
- Record: 5–7 (2–6 MAC)
- Head coach: Chris Creighton (11th season)
- Offensive coordinator: Mike Piatkowski (2nd season)
- Offensive scheme: Spread
- Defensive coordinator: Ben Needham (2nd season)
- Base defense: 4–2–5
- Home stadium: Rynearson Stadium

2024 Mid-American Conference football standings
	Conf.			Overall
Team	W		L	W		L
Ohio y$	7	–	1	11	–	3
Miami (OH) y	7	–	1	9	–	5
Buffalo	6	–	2	9	–	4
Bowling Green	6	–	2	7	–	6
Western Michigan	5	–	3	6	–	7
Toledo	4	–	4	8	–	5
Northern Illinois	4	–	4	8	–	5
Akron	3	–	5	4	–	8
Eastern Michigan	2	–	6	5	–	7
Central Michigan	2	–	6	4	–	8
Ball State	2	–	6	3	–	9
Kent State	0	–	8	0	–	12
Championship: Ohio 38, Miami (OH) 3
$ – Conference champion; y – Championship game participant

The 2024 Eastern Michigan Eagles football team represented Eastern Michigan University in the Mid-American Conference during the 2024 NCAA Division I FBS football season. The Eagles were led by Chris Creighton in his eleventh year as the head coach. The Eagles played their home games at Rynearson Stadium, located in Ypsilanti, Michigan.

== Preseason ==
=== Preseason poll ===
On July 19 the MAC announced the preseason coaches poll. Eastern Michigan was picked to finish sixth in the conference. The Eagles received zero votes to win the MAC Championship.

== Schedule ==
Date	Time	Opponent	Site	TV	Result	Attendance
August 31	3:30 p.m.	at UMass*	Warren McGuirk Alumni Stadium; Hadley, MA	ESPN+	W 28–14	12,810
September 7	3:30 p.m.	at Washington*	Husky Stadium; Seattle, WA	BTN	L 9–30	64,222
September 14	7:00 p.m.	Jacksonville State*	Rynearson Stadium; Ypsilanti, MI	ESPN+	W 37–34 ^{2OT}	17,501
September 21	2:00 p.m.	Saint Francis (PA)*	Rynearson Stadium; Ypsilanti, MI	ESPN+	W 36–0	15,509
September 28	3:30 p.m.	at Kent State	Dix Stadium; Kent, OH	ESPN+	W 52–33	10,899
October 12	2:00 p.m.	Miami (OH)	Rynearson Stadium; Ypsilanti, MI	ESPN+	L 14–38	16,903
October 19	2:00 p.m.	Central Michigan^{†}	Rynearson Stadium; Ypsilanti, MI (rivalry, Michigan MAC Trophy)	ESPN+	W 38–34	17,974
October 26	3:30 p.m.	at Akron	InfoCision Stadium; Akron, OH	ESPN+	L 21–25	4,277
November 2	12:00 p.m.	Toledo	Rynearson Stadium; Ypsilanti, MI	ESPNU	L 28–29	13,044
November 13	7:00 p.m.	at Ohio	Peden Stadium; Athens, OH	ESPN2	L 10–35	14,133
November 20	7:00 p.m.	Buffalo	Rynearson Stadium; Ypsilanti, MI	ESPNU	L 20–37	12,004
November 30	1:30 p.m.	at Western Michigan	Waldo Stadium; Kalamazoo, MI (Michigan MAC Trophy)	ESPN+	L 18–26	11,263
*Non-conference game; ^{†}Homecoming; All times are in Eastern time

== Game summaries ==
=== at UMass ===
Game One – Eastern Michigan Eagles (0–0) at UMass Minutemen (0–0) – Game summary

Quarter	1	2	3	4	Total
Eagles	0	14	3	11	28
Minutemen	0	0	7	7	14

at Warren McGuirk Alumni Stadium • Hadley, Massachusetts

- Date: Saturday August 31, 2024
- Game time: 3:30 p.m. EDT
- Game weather: Cloudy, 79 °F (26 °C)
- Game attendance: 12,810
- Referee: Rory Bernard
- TV announcers (ESPN+): Jay Burnham (play-by-play) and Andy Gresh (analyst)

Game information

First quarter

No scoring plays

Second quarter

- EMU – Cole Snyder 1-yard run (Jesus Gomez kick), 12:47. Eagles 7–0. Drive: 10 plays, 97 yards, 3:53.
- EMU – Oran Singleton 18-yard pass from Cole Snyder (Jesus Gomez kick), 0:31. Eagles 14–0. Drive: 6 plays, 57 yards, 0:31.

Third quarter

- MASS – Jalen John 1-yard run (Jacob Lurie kick), 8:43. Eagles 14–7. Drive: 10 plays, 70 yards, 5:24.
- EMU – Jesus Gomez 20-yard field goal, 4:49. Eagles 17–7. Drive: 10 plays, 73 yards, 3:54.

Fourth quarter

- EMU – Jesus Gomez 31-yard field goal, 7:49. Eagles 20–7. Drive: 13 plays, 59 yards, 7:01.
- EMU – Delbert Mimms III 6-yard (Cole Snyder pass to Markus Allen), 5:43. Eagles 28–7. Drive: 2 plays, 33 yards, 0:29.
- MASS – C. J. Hester 2-yard run (Jacob Lurie kick), 3:06. Eagles 28–14. Drive: 8 plays, 75 yards, 2:37.

Statistics	EMU	MASS
First downs	21	24
Total yards	375	329
Rushing yards	134	152
Passing yards	241	177
Passing: Comp–Att–Int	17–28–0	20–30–0
Time of possession	26:37	33:23

Team	Category	Player	Statistics
Eastern Michigan	Passing	Cole Snyder	17/28, 241 yards, TD
Eastern Michigan	Rushing	Delbert Mimms III	12 carries, 60 yards, TD
Eastern Michigan	Receiving	Oran Singleton	8 receptions, 89 yards, TD
UMass	Passing	Taisun Phommachanh	20/30, 177 yards
UMass	Rushing	Taisun Phommachanh	16 carries, 57 yards
UMass	Receiving	Jalen John	5 receptions, 42 yards

=== at Washington ===
Game Two – Eastern Michigan Eagles (1–0) at Washington Huskies (1–0) – Game summary

Quarter	1	2	3	4	Total
Eagles	3	3	0	3	9
Huskies	0	21	9	0	30

at Husky Stadium, Seattle, Washington

- Date: Saturday September 7, 2024
- Game time: 3:30 p.m. EST
- Game weather: Clear, 79 °F (26 °C)
- Game attendance: 64,222
- Referee: Gregory Blum
- TV announcers (BTN): Mark Followill (play-by-play), Lincoln Kennedy (analyst) and Alyssa Charlston (sideline)

Game information

First quarter

- EMU – Jesus Gomez 57-yard field goal, 0:07. Eagles 3–0. Drive: 10 plays, 53 yards, 3:42.

Second quarter

- WASH – Decker DeGraaf 41-yard pass from Will Rogers (Grady Gross kick), 9:37. Huskies 7–3. Drive: 6 plays, 82 yards, 3:05.
- EMU – Jesus Gomez 29-yard field goal, 4:49. Huskies 7–6. Drive: 11 plays, 64 yards, 4:48.
- WASH – Denzel Boston 13-yard pass from Will Rogers (Grady Gross kick), 3:07. Huskies 14–6. Drive: 3 plays, 80 yards, 1:36.
- WASH – Denzel Boston 1-yard pass from Will Rogers (Grady Gross kick), 0:24. Huskies 21–6. Drive: 8 plays, 65 yards, 1:27.

Third quarter

- WASH – Jeremiah Hunter 24-yard pass from Will Rogers (kick blocked), 9:57. Huskies 27–6. Drive: 4 plays, 58 yards, 2:18.
- WASH – Grady Gross 28-yard file goal, 0:50. Huskies 30–6. Drive: 12 plays, 56 yards, 6:04.

Fourth quarter

- EMU – Jesus Gomez 50-yard field goal, 8:09. Huskies 30–9. Drive: 15 plays, 43 yards, 7:41.

Statistics	EMU	WASH
First downs	17	23
Total yards	204	501
Rushing yards	75	185
Passing yards	129	316
Passing: Comp–Att–Int	16–27–0	24–29–0
Time of possession	31:55	28:05

Team	Category	Player	Statistics
Eastern Michigan	Passing	Cole Snyder	16/27, 129 yards
Eastern Michigan	Rushing	Dontae McMillan	8 carries, 33 yards
Eastern Michigan	Receiving	Zyell Griffin	2 receptions, 35 yards
Washington	Passing	Will Rogers	21/26, 261 yards, 4 TD
Washington	Rushing	Jonah Coleman	11 carries, 104 yards
Washington	Receiving	Jeremiah Hunter	5 receptions, 72 yards, TD

=== Jacksonville State ===
Game Three – Jacksonville State Gamecocks (0–2) at Eastern Michigan Eagles (1–1) – Game summary

Quarter	1	2	3	4	OT	2OT	Total
Gamecocks	7	13	0	11	3	0	34
Eagles	14	14	3	0	3	3	37

at Rynearson Stadium • Ypsilanti, Michigan

- Date: September 14, 2024
- Game time: 7:00 p.m. EST
- Game weather: Sunny • Temperature: 80 °F (27 °C) • Wind: E at 8 miles per hour (13 km/h)
- Game attendance: 17,501
- Referee: Rich Edwards
- TV announcers (ESPN+): Doug Sherman (play-by-play) and Tyoka Jackson (analyst)

Game information

First quarter

- (10:11) JVST – Tre Stewart 5-yard run, Garrison Rippa kick (Drive: 13 plays, 75 yards, 4:49; Jacksonville State 7–0)
- (6:43) EMU – Delbert Mimms III 5-yard run, Jesus Gomez kick (Drive: 10 plays, 75 yards, 3:28; Tied 7–7)
- (1:21) EMU – Elijah Jackson-Anderson 24-yard pass from Cole Snyder, Jesus Gomez kick (Drive: 10 plays, 77 yards, 3:48; Eastern Michigan 14–7)

Second quarter

- (13:19) JVST – Garrison Rippa 35-yard field goal (Drive: 8 plays, 53 yards, 3:02; Eastern Michigan 14–10)
- (11:39) JVST – Cam Vaughn 37-yard pass from Tyler Huff, Garrison Rippa kick (Drive: 1 play, 37 yards, 0:09; Jacksonville State 17–14)
- (8:10) EMU – Max Reese 34-yard pass from Cole Snyder, Jesus Gomez kick (Drive: 7 plays, 75 yards, 3:29; Eastern Michigan 21–17)
- (3:22) EMU – Max Reese 22-yard pass from Terry Lockett, Jesus Gomez kick (Drive: 6 plays, 55 yards, 2:47; Eastern Michigan 28–17)
- (0:48) JVST – Garrison Rippa 48-yard field goal (Drive: 7 plays, 45 yards, 2:34; Eastern Michigan 28–20)

Third quarter

- (1:00) EMU – Jesus Gomez 41-yard field goal (Drive: 14 plays, 41 yards, 7:14; Eastern Michigan 31–20)

Fourth quarter

- (14:10) JVST – Michael Pettway 32-yard pass from Tyler Huff, Brock Rechsteiner pass (Drive: 6 plays, 75 yards, 1:50; Eastern Michigan 31–28)
- (0:34) JVST – Garrison Rippa 51-yard field goal (Drive: 7 plays, 37 yards, 1:18; Tied 31–31)

Overtime

- (0:00) EMU – Jesus Gomez 40-yard field goal (Drive: 4 plays, 3 yards, 0:00; Eastern Michigan 34–31)
- (0:00) JVST – Garrison Rippa 40-yard field goal (Drive: 6 plays, 3 yards, 0:00; Tied 34–34)

Double overtime

- (0:00) EMU – Jesus Gomez 34-yard field goal (Drive: 4 plays, 9 yards, 0:00; Eastern Michigan 37–34)

Statistics	JVST	EMU
First downs	24	27
Total yards	423	447
Rushing yards	112	152
Passing yards	311	295
Passing: Comp–Att–Int	24–34–0	27–39–0
Time of possession	21:15	38:45

Team	Category	Player	Statistics
Jacksonville State	Passing	Tyler Huff	24/34, 311 yards, 2 TD
Jacksonville State	Rushing	Tyler Huff	14 carries, 80 yards
Jacksonville State	Receiving	Cam Vaughn	6 receptions, 94 yards, TD
Eastern Michigan	Passing	Cole Snyder	26/37, 273 yards, 2 TD
Eastern Michigan	Rushing	Elijah Jackson-Arnold	24 carries, 87 yards
Eastern Michigan	Receiving	Oran Singleton	8 receptions, 89 yards

=== Saint Francis (PA) (FCS) ===
Game Four – Saint Francis Red Flash (FCS) (1–2) vs Eastern Michigan Eagles (2–1) – Game summary

Quarter	1	2	3	4	Total
Red Flash (FCS)	0	0	0	0	0
Eagles	10	3	16	7	36

at Rynearson Stadium, Ypsilanti, Michigan

- Date: Saturday September 21, 2024
- Game time: 2:00 PM
- TV announcers (ESPN+): Anthony Lima (play-by-play) and Je'Rod Cherry (analyst)

Game information

First quarter

- EMU – David Carter Jr. 99-yard fumble return (Jesus Gomez kick) 4:33. Eagles 7–0. Drive: 14 plays, 79 yards, 7:28.
- EMU – Jesus Gomez 40-yard field goal, 0:44. Eagles 10–0. Drive: 7 plays, 31 yards, 2:08.

Second quarter

- EMU – Jesus Gomez 49-yard field goal, 6:46. Eagles 13–0. Drive: 12 plays, 38 yards, 5:50.

Third quarter

- EMU – Delbert Mimms III 1-yard run (kick failed) 9:12. Eagles 19–0. Drive: 6 plays, 44 yards, 2:23.
- EMU – Kendric Nowling 0-yard blocked punt return (Jesus Gomez kick) 7:38. Eagles 26–0. Drive: 3 plays, -7 yards, 1:34.
- EMU – Jesus Gomez 37-yard field goal, 6:03. Eagles 29–0. Drive: 4 plays, 0 yards, 0:45.

Fourth quarter

- EMU – Zyell Griffin 89-yard pass from Jeremiah Salem (Jesus Gomez kick) 11:20. Eagles 36–0. Drive: 6 plays, 94 yards, 3:28.

Statistics	SFPA	EMU
First downs	14	17
Total yards	154	327
Rushing yards	43	124
Passing yards	111	203
Passing: Comp–Att–Int	15-27-1	14-24-0
Time of possession	30:22	29:38

Team	Category	Player	Statistics
Saint Francis (PA)	Passing	Adrian Mejia	15/27, 111 yards, INT
Saint Francis (PA)	Rushing	Adrian Mejia	17 carries, 20 yards
Saint Francis (PA)	Receiving	Jayden Ivory	3 receptions, 42 yards
Eastern Michigan	Passing	Jeremiah Salem	5/5, 102 yards, TD
Eastern Michigan	Rushing	Deion Brown	6 carries, 33 yards
Eastern Michigan	Receiving	Zyell Griffin	1 reception, 89 yards, TD

=== at Kent State ===
Game Five – Eastern Michigan Eagles (3–1) at Kent State Golden Flashes (0–4) – Game summary

Quarter	1	2	3	4	Total
Eagles	7	14	17	14	52
Golden Flashes	7	7	7	12	33

at Dix Stadium • Kent, Ohio

- Date: Saturday September 28, 2024
- Game time: 3:30 p.m. EDT
- Game weather: Cloudy • Temperature: 80 °F (27 °C) • Wind: E at 4 miles per hour (6.4 km/h)
- Game attendance: 10,899
- Referee: Billy Williams
- TV announcers (ESPN+): Shawn Kenney (play-by-play) and Ryan Cavanaugh (analyst)

Game information

First quarter

- (10:39) EMU – Elijah Jackson-Anderson 4-yard run, Jesus Gomez kick (Drive: 12 plays, 75 yards, 4:21; Eastern Michigan 7–0)
- (0:39) KSU – Ayden Harris 9-yard run, Will Hryszko kick (Drive: 8 plays, 61 yards, 3:39; Tie 7–7)

Second quarter

- (6:36) EMU – Delbert Mimms III 27-yard run, Jesus Gomez kick (Drive: 1 play, 27 yards, 0:06; Eastern Michigan 14–7)
- (5:11) KSU – Luke Floriea 43-yard pass from Tommy Ulatowski, Will Hryszko kick (Drive: 3 plays, 60 yards, 1:20; Tie 14–14)
- (2:12) EMU – Elijah Jackson-Anderson 4-yard run, Jesus Gomez kick (Drive: 10 plays, 75 yards, 2:52; Eastern Michigan 21–14)

Third quarter

- (14:30) KSU – Chrishon McCray 65-yard pass from Tommy Ulatowski, Will Hryszko kick (Drive: 2 plays, 75 yards, 0:40; Tie 21–21)
- (7:10) EMU – Cole Snyder 2-yard run, Jesus Gomez kick (Drive: 3 plays, 30 yards, 0:56; Eastern Michigan 28–21)
- (4:06) EMU – Jesus Gomez 26-yard field goal (Drive: 8 plays, 26 yards, 2:54; Eastern Michigan 31–21)
- (1:51) EMU – Oran Singleton 5-yard pass from Cole Snyder, Jesus Gomez kick (Drive: 3 plays, 24 yards, 0:42; Eastern Michigan 38–21)

Fourth quarter

- (14:02) EMU – Delbert Mimms III 27-yard run, Jesus Gomez kick (Drive: 4 plays, 45 yards, 0:57; Eastern Michigan 45–21)
- (9:21) KSU – Chrishon McCray 68-yard pass from Tommy Ulatowski, two-point conversion failed (Drive: 4 plays, 73 yards, 1:04; Eastern Michigan 45–27)
- (7:02) EMU – Deion Brown 26-yard run, Jesus Gomez kick (Drive: 4 plays, 47 yards, 2:18; Eastern Michigan 52–27)
- (4:07) KSU – Tommy Ulatowski 4-yard run, two-point conversion failed (Drive: 8 plays, 75 yards, 2:47; Eastern Michigan 52–33)

Statistics	EMU	KENT
First downs	30	19
Total yards	486	422
Rushing yards	273	77
Passing yards	213	345
Passing: Comp–Att–Int	26-33-0	15-28-1
Time of possession	33:55	26:05

Team	Category	Player	Statistics
Eastern Michigan	Passing	Cole Snyder	26/33, 213 yards, TD
Eastern Michigan	Rushing	Delbert Mimms III	23 carries, 145 yards, 2 TD
Eastern Michigan	Receiving	Terry Lockett Jr.	8 receptions, 75 yards
Kent State	Passing	Tommy Ulatowski	15/28, 345 yards, 3 TD, INT
Kent State	Rushing	Ayden Harris	14 carries, 63 yards, TD
Kent State	Receiving	Chrishon McCray	5 receptions, 188 yards, 2 TD

=== Miami (OH) ===
Game Six – Miami RedHawks (1–4) vs Eastern Michigan Eagles (4–1) – Game summary

Quarter	1	2	3	4	Total
RedHawks	7	14	0	17	38
Eagles	7	0	7	0	14

at Rynearson Stadium, Ypsilanti, Michigan

- Date: Saturday October 12, 2024
- Game time: 2:00 p.m.
- TV announcers (ESPN+): Michael Reghi (play-by-play) and Marcus Ray (analyst)

Game information

First quarter

- (14:50) MIA – Reggie Virgil 75-yard pass from Brett Gabbert (Dom Dzioban kick) (Drive: 1 play, 75 yards, 0:10; Miami (OH) 7–0)
- (10:04) EMU – Cole Snyder 1-yard run (Jesus Gomez kick) (Drive: 12 plays, 75 yards, 4:46; Tie 7–7)

Second quarter

- (10:02) MIA – Connor Briggs 5-yard pass from Brett Gabbert (Dom Dzioban kick) (Drive: 7 plays, 59 yards, 3:51; Miami (OH) 14–7)
- (0:35) MIA – Reggie Virgil 19-yard pass from Brett Gabbert (Dom Dzioban kick) (Drive: 4 plays, 34 yards, 1:54; Miami (OH) 21–7)

Third quarter

- (2:41) EMU – Delbert Mimms III 1-yard run (Jesus Gomez kick) (Drive: 10 plays, 59 yards, 3:27; Miami (OH) 21–14)

Fourth quarter

- (14:55) MIA – Cole Weaver 24-yard pass from Brett Gabbert (Dom Dzioban kick) (Drive: 5 plays, 80 yards, 2:42; Miami (OH) 28–14)
- (5:01) MIA – Dom Dzioban 44-yard field goal (Drive: 7 plays, 60 yards, 4:34; Miami (OH) 31–14)
- (1:30) MIA – Jordan Brunson 44-yard run (Dom Dzioban kick) (Drive: 3 plays, 51 yards, 0:18; Miami (OH) 38–14)

Statistics	M-OH	EMU
First downs	16	24
Total yards	421	332
Rushing yards	199	121
Passing yards	222	211
Passing: Comp–Att–Int	10-13-0	27-42-1
Time of possession	25:50	34:10

Team	Category	Player	Statistics
Miami (OH)	Passing	Brett Gabbert	10/13, 222 yards, 4 TD
Miami (OH)	Rushing	Keyon Mozee	16 carries, 100 yards
Miami (OH)	Receiving	Reggie Virgil	3 receptions, 113 yards, 2 TD
Eastern Michigan	Passing	Cole Snyder	27/42, 211 yards, INT
Eastern Michigan	Rushing	Delbert Mimms III	20 carries, 78 yards, TD
Eastern Michigan	Receiving	Max Reese	7 receptions, 50 yards

=== Central Michigan (rivalry) ===
Game Seven – Central Michigan Chippewas (3–3) vs Eastern Michigan Eagles (4–2) – Game summary

Quarter	1	2	3	4	Total
Chippewas	0	14	13	7	34
Eagles	10	6	0	22	38

at Rynearson Stadium, Ypsilanti, Michigan

- Date: Saturday October 19, 2024
- Game time: 2:00 p.m.
- TV announcers (ESPN+): Michael Reghi (play-by-play) and Marcus Ray (analyst)

Game information

First quarter

- EMU – Markus Allen 15-yard pass from Cole Snyder (Jesus Gomez kick), 11:13. Eastern Michigan 7–0. Drive: 5 plays, 67 yards, 1:21.
- EMU – Jesus Gomez 22-yard field goal, 2:18. Eastern Michigan 10–0. Drive: 14 plays, 86 yards, 5:18.

Second quarter

- EMU – Jesus Gomez 41-yard field goal, 7:57. Eastern Michigan 13–0. Drive: 14 plays, 49 yards, 7:47.
- CMU – Evan Boyd 22-yard pass from Bert Emanuel Jr. (Tristan Mattson kick), 1:41. Eastern Michigan 13–7. Drive: 7 plays, 73 yards, 2:34.
- CMU – Jason Williams 67-yard fumble return (Tristan Mattson kick), 1:00. Central Michigan 14–13.
- EMU – Jesus Gomez 48-yard field goal, 0:00. Eastern Michigan 16–14. Drive: 8 plays, 43 yards, 0:50.

Third quarter

- CMU – Bert Emanuel Jr. 2-yard run (Tristan Mattson kick), 14:10. Central Michigan 21-16. Drive: 2 plays, 68 yards, 0:45.
- CMU – Tristan Mattson 56-yard field goal, 7:29. Central Michigan 24–16. Drive: 8 plays, 47 yards, 3:58.
- CMU – Tristan Mattson 51-yard field goal, 2:09. Central Michigan 27–16. Drive: 6 plays, 35 yards, 3:42.

Fourth quarter

- CMU – Gavin Harris 2-yard run (Tristan Mattson kick), 13:26. Central Michigan 34–16. Drive: 5 plays, 77 yards, 2:27.
- EMU – Terry Lockett Jr. 49-yard pass from Cole Snyder (Cole Snyder pass to Joey Mattord for 2-point conversion), 10:54. Central Michigan 34–24. Drive: 8 plays, 75 yards, 2:32.
- EMU – Terry Lockett Jr. 30-yard pass from Cole Snyder (Jesus Gomez kick), 7:19. Central Michigan 34–31. Drive: 3 plays, 45 yards, 1:08.
- EMU – Cole Snyder 1-yard run (Jesus Gomez kick), 1:42. Eastern Michigan 38–34. Drive: 7 plays, 62 yards, 2:12.

Statistics	CMU	EMU
First downs	20	23
Total yards	383	450
Rushing yards	285	150
Passing yards	98	300
Passing: Comp–Att–Int	5-12-0	17-38-1
Time of possession	29:07	30:53

Team	Category	Player	Statistics
Central Michigan	Passing	Bert Emanuel Jr.	3/4, 92 yards, TD
Central Michigan	Rushing	Marion Lukes	13 carries, 118 yards
Central Michigan	Receiving	Solomon Davis	1 reception, 48 yards
Eastern Michigan	Passing	Cole Snyder	17/38, 300 yards, 3 TD, INT
Eastern Michigan	Rushing	Delbert Mimms III	21 carries, 90 yards
Eastern Michigan	Receiving	Markus Allen	7 receptions, 140 yards, TD

=== at Akron ===
Game Eight – Eastern Michigan Eagles (5–2) at Akron Zips (1–6) – Game summary

Quarter	1	2	3	4	Total
Eagles	0	0	14	7	21
Zips	8	10	0	7	25

at InfoCision Stadium • Akron, Ohio

- Date: Saturday October 26, 2024
- Game time: 3:30 p.m.
- Game weather: 0 °F (−18 °C)
- TV announcers (ESPN+): Anthony Lima (play-by-play) and Ryan Cavanaugh (analyst)

Game information

First quarter

- AKR – Tahj Bullock 3-yard run (Tahj Bullock pass to Liam Reardon for 2-point conversion), 2:54. Akron 8–0. Drive: 7 plays, 36 yards, 3:27.

Second quarter

- AKR – Garrison Smith 34-yard field goal, 14:09. Akron 11–0. Drive: 6 plays, 45 yards, 2:15.
- AKR – Tahj Bullock 14-yard run (Garrison Smith kick), 2:45. Akron 18–0. Drive: 7 plays, 71 yards, 3:28.

Third quarter

- EMU – Jere Getzinger 2-yard pass from Cole Snyder (Cole Snyder pass to Max Reese for 2-point conversion), 6:15. Akron 18-8. Drive: 14 plays, 65 yards, 5:24.
- EMU – Jere Getzinger 18-yard pass from Cole Snyder (PAT failed), 0:31. Akron 18–14. Drive: 9 plays, 73 yards, 3:42.

Fourth quarter

- EMU – Delbert Mimms III 1-yard run (Jesus Gomez kick), 7:41. Eastern Michigan 21–18. Drive: 12 plays, 99 yards, 5:30.
- AKR – Adrian Norton 21-yard pass from Ben Finley (Garrison Smith kick), 3:59. Akron 25–21. Drive: 11 plays, 75 yards, 3:42.

Statistics	EMU	AKR
First downs	23	20
Total yards	475	377
Rushing yards	121	220
Passing yards	354	157
Passing: Comp–Att–Int	29-48-0	14-25-1
Time of possession	31:44	28:16

Team	Category	Player	Statistics
Eastern Michigan	Passing	Cole Snyder	29/48, 354 yards, 2 TD
Eastern Michigan	Rushing	Delbert Mimms III	22 carries, 58 yards, TD
Eastern Michigan	Receiving	Terry Lockett Jr.	3 receptions, 98 yards
Akron	Passing	Ben Finley	12/22, 121 yards, TD, INT
Akron	Rushing	Jordon Simmons	16 carries, 109 yards
Akron	Receiving	Bobby Golden	4 receptions, 61 yards

=== Toledo ===
Game Nine – Toledo Rockets (5–3) at Eastern Michigan Eagles (5–3) – Game summary

Quarter	1	2	3	4	Total
Rockets	0	7	0	22	29
Eagles	7	3	9	9	28

at Rynearson Stadium • Ypsilanti, Michigan

- Date: Saturday November 2, 2024
- Game time: 12:00 p.m.
- Game weather: Sunny • Temperature: 49 °F (9 °C) • Wind: SE 3 miles per hour (4.8 km/h)
- Game attendance: 13,044
- Referee: Andrew Spaciale
- TV announcers (ESPNU): Matt Schumacker (play-by-play) and Dustin Fox (analyst)

Game information

First quarter

- (1:39) EMU – Markus Allen 6-yard pass from Cole Snyder, Jesus Gomez kick (Drive: 11 plays, 89 yards, 4:24; Eastern Michigan 7–0)

Second quarter

- (11:30) TOL – Tucker Gleason 3-yard run, Dylan Cunanan kick (Drive: 7 plays, 54 yards, 3:19; Tied 7–7)
- (7:10) EMU – Jesus Gomez 45-yard field goal (Drive: 10 plays, 48 yards, 4:20; Eastern Michigan 10–7)

Third quarter

- (8:08) EMU – Jesus Gomez 32-yard field goal (Drive: 12 plays, 64 yards, 6:47; Eastern Michigan 13–7)
- (1:25) EMU – Joey Mattord 1-yard run (Drive: 10 plays, 41 yards, 4:27; Eastern Michigan 19–7)

Fourth quarter

- (12:55) TOL – Anthony Torres 78-yard pass from Tucker Gleason, Dylan Cunanan kick (Drive: 3 plays, 80 yards, 0:51; Eastern Michigan 19–14)
- (9:51) TOL – Junior Vandeross III 25-yard pass from Tucker Gleason, Jerjuan Newton pass (Drive: 2 plays, 27 yards, 0:44; Toledo 22–19)
- (7:08) EMU – Jesus Gomez 28-yard field goal (Drive: 8 plays, 70 yards, 2:38; Tied 22–22)
- (1:56) TOL – Thomas Zsiros 25-yard pass from Tucker Gleason, Dylan Cunanan kick (Drive: 5 plays, 60 yards, 2:48; Toledo 29–22)
- (0:00) EMU – Terry Lockett 36-yard pass from Cole Snyder (Drive: 8 plays, 82 yards, 1:00; Toledo 29–28)

Statistics	TOL	EMU
First downs	16	24
Total yards	418	433
Rushing yards	167	168
Passing yards	251	265
Passing: Comp–Att–Int	18–34–1	24–46–1
Time of possession	24:32	35:28

Team	Category	Player	Statistics
Toledo	Passing	Tucker Gleason	18/34, 251 yards, 3 TD, INT
Toledo	Rushing	Sevaughn Clark	10 carries, 78 yards
Toledo	Receiving	Anthony Torres	1 reception, 78 yards, TD
Eastern Michigan	Passing	Cole Snyder	24/45, 265 yards, 2 TD, INT
Eastern Michigan	Rushing	Cole Snyder	12 carries, 65 yards
Eastern Michigan	Receiving	Oran Singleton	8 receptions, 103 yards

=== at Ohio ===
Game Ten – Eastern Michigan Eagles (5–4) at Ohio Bobcats (6–3) – Game summary

Quarter	1	2	3	4	Total
Eagles	0	7	0	3	10
Bobcats	0	14	7	14	35

at Peden Stadium • Athens, Ohio

- Date: Wednesday November 13, 2024
- Game time: 7:00 p.m.
- Game weather: Sunny • Temperature: 54 °F (12 °C) • Wind: E 5ph
- Game attendance: 14,133
- Referee: Jeremy Valentine
- TV announcers (ESPN2): Jay Alter (play-by-play) and Rocky Boiman (analyst)

Game information

First quarter

No scoring plays

Second quarter

- (12:47) EMU – Delbert Mimms III 18-yard pass from Cole Snyder (Jesus Gomez kick), Drive: 6 plays, 79 yards, 2:48; EMU 7–0
- (07:11) OHIO – Parker Navarro 3-yard run (Gianni Spetic kick), Drive: 10 plays, 72 yards, 5:16; Tied 7–7
- (00:13) OHIO – Anthony Tyus III 1-yard run (Gianni Spetic kick), Drive: 8 plays, 75 yards, 2:17; OHIO 14–7

Third quarter

- (06:04) OHIO – Parker Navarro 25-yard run (Gianni Spetic kick), Drive: 1 play, 25 yards, 0:07; OHIO 21–7

Fourth quarter

- (13:13) EMU – Jesus Gomez 29-yard field goal, Drive: 16 plays, 64 yards, 7:51; OHIO 21–10
- (07:20) OHIO – Parker Navarro 1-yard run (Gianni Spetic kick), Drive: 9 plays, 85 yards, 5:47; OHIO 28–10
- (02:59) OHIO – Parker Navarro 4-yard run (Gianni Spetic kick), Drive: 6 plays, 19 yards, 4:13; OHIO 35–10

Statistics	EMU	OHIO
First downs	15	20
Total yards	266	434
Rushing yards	111	157
Passing yards	155	277
Passing: Comp–Att–Int	18–30–3	22–32–1
Time of possession	27:57	32:03

Team	Category	Player	Statistics
Eastern Michigan	Passing	Cole Snyder	18/30, 155 yards, TD, 3 INT
Eastern Michigan	Rushing	Delbert Mimms III	16 carries, 71 yards
Eastern Michigan	Receiving	Oran Singleton	5 receptions, 70 yards
Ohio	Passing	Parker Navarro	22/32, 277 yards, INT
Ohio	Rushing	Parker Navarro	13 carries, 106 yards, 4 TD
Ohio	Receiving	Coleman Owen	8 receptions, 139 yards

=== Buffalo ===
Game Eleven – Buffalo Bulls (6–4) at Eastern Michigan Eagles (5–5) – Game summary

Quarter	1	2	3	4	Total
Bulls	8	9	6	14	37
Eagles	0	0	13	7	20

at Rynearson Stadium • Ypsilanti, Michigan

- Date: Wednesday November 20, 2024
- Game time: 7:00 p.m.
- Game weather: Clear • Temperature: 40 °F (4 °C) • Wind: SW 9 miles per hour (14 km/h)
- Game attendance: 12,004
- Referee: David Siegle
- TV announcers (ESPNU): Justin Kutcher (play-by-play) and Rene Ingoglia (analyst)

Game information

First quarter

- (8:47) BUF – JJ Jenkins 90-yard pass from C. J. Ogbonna, Andrew Schnackenberg rush (Drive: 1 play, 90 yards, 0:13; Buffalo 8–0)

Second quarter

- (9:23) BUF – Dion Crawford 0-yard safety (Buffalo 10–0)
- (2:08) BUF – Victor Snow 7-yard pass from C. J. Ogbonna, Upton Bellenfant kick (Drive: 15 plays, 80 yards, 7:10; Buffalo 17–0)

Third quarter

- (9:51) EMU – Terry Lockett 38-yard pass from Cole Snyder, Jesus Gomez kick (Drive: 9 plays, 90 yards, 3:17; Buffalo 17–7)
- (5:14) BUF – Al-Jay Henderson 1-yard run (Drive: 10 plays, 75 yards, 4:37; Buffalo 23–7)
- (0:52) EMU – Terry Lockett 13-yard pass from Cole Snyder, Jesus Gomez kick (Drive: 9 plays, 75 yards, 4:22; Buffalo 23–13)

Fourth quarter

- (8:54) EMU – Markus Allen 78-yard pass from Cole Snyder, Jesus Gomez kick (Drive: 2 plays, 90 yards, 0:33; Buffalo 23–20)
- (8:43) BUF – Al-Jay Henderson 75-yard pass from C. J. Ogbonna, Upton Bellenfant kick (Drive: 1 play, 75 yards, 0:11; Buffalo 30–20)
- (2:59) BUF – Shaun Dolac 60-yard interception, Upton Bellenfant kick (Buffalo 37–20)

Statistics	UB	EMU
First downs	20	20
Total yards	396	445
Rushing yards	136	70
Passing yards	260	375
Passing: Comp–Att–Int	18–28–0	27–39–3
Time of possession	31:48	28:12

Team	Category	Player	Statistics
Buffalo	Passing	C. J. Ogbonna	18/28, 260 yards, 3 TD
Buffalo	Rushing	Al-Jay Henderson	25 carries, 86 yards, TD
Buffalo	Receiving	JJ Jenkins	5 receptions, 120 yards, TD
Eastern Michigan	Passing	Cole Snyder	24/33, 351 yards, 3 TD, 2 INT
Eastern Michigan	Rushing	Delbert Mimms III	12 carries, 49 yards
Eastern Michigan	Receiving	Markus Allen	9 receptions, 187 yards, TD

=== at Western Michigan ===
Game Twelve – Eastern Michigan Eagles (5–6) at Western Michigan Broncos (5–6) – Game summary

Quarter	1	2	3	4	Total
Eagles	0	0	15	3	18
Broncos	0	16	7	3	26

at Waldo Stadium • Kalamazoo, Michigan

- Date: Saturday November 30, 2024
- Game time: 1:30 p.m.
- Game weather: 0 °F (−18 °C)
- TV announcers (ESPN+): Michael Reghi (play-by-play) and Ryan Cavanaugh (analyst)

Game information

First quarter

- No scoring plays

Second quarter

- (3:41) WMU – Team safety (Western Michigan 2–0)
- (1:50) WMU – Zahir Abdus-Salaam 31-yard pass from Hayden Wolff (Luka Zurak kick) (Western Michigan 9–0)
- (0:19) WMU – Jalen Buckley 15-yard run (Luka Zurak kick) (Western Michigan 16–0)

Third quarter

- (12:02) EMU – Delbert Mimms III 10-yard run (Cole Snyder pass to Max Reese for 2-point conversion) (Western Michigan 16–8)
- (6:04) WMU – Zahir Abdus-Salaam 22-yard run (Luka Zurak kick) (Western Michigan 23–8)
- (2:16) EMU – Delbert Mimms III 1-yard run (Jesus Gomez kick) (Western Michigan 23–15)

Fourth quarter

- (11:33) WMU – Luka Zurak 25-yard field goal (Western Michigan 26–15)
- (11:28) EMU – Jesus Gomez 32-yard field goal (Western Michigan 26–18)

Statistics	EMU	WMU
First downs	15	20
Total yards	294	356
Rushing yards	203	230
Passing yards	91	126
Passing: Comp–Att–Int	7-22-1	12-17-0
Time of possession	24:01	35:59

Team	Category	Player	Statistics
Eastern Michigan	Passing	Cole Snyder	7/22, 91 yards, INT
Eastern Michigan	Rushing	Delbert Mimms III	18 carries, 127 yards, 2 TD
Eastern Michigan	Receiving	Markus Allen	3 receptions, 59 yards
Western Michigan	Passing	Hayden Wolff	12/17, 126 yards, TD
Western Michigan	Rushing	Zahir Abdus-Salaam	19 carries, 135 yards, TD
Western Michigan	Receiving	Zahir Abdus-Salaam	3 receptions, 40 yards, TD
