= Jim Nichols =

American college administrator and former football coach

Biographical details
- Born: August 27, 1975 (age 51); Camden, Arkansas, U.S.
- Education: Harding University

Coaching career (HC unless noted)
- 2003–2005: Auburn (GA)
- 2006–2008: Faulkner
- 2009: Troy (assistant)
- 2010–2013: Texas Tech (director of football)
- 2016: Mount Dora Christian (FL)
- 2019: Liberty (chief of staff)

Administrative career (AD unless noted)
- 2015–2019: Mount Dora Christian (FL)
- 2019–?: Liberty (assistant AD)

Head coaching record
- Overall: 2–18 (college); 5–5 (high school)

Jim M. Nichols is American college administrator and former football coach. He was the first head football coach at Faulkner University in Montgomery, Alabama, Nichols was hired at Faulkner in 2006 following three seasons as a graduate assistant at Auburn University, where he worked under head football coach Tommy Tuberville.

Nichols was the athletics director at Mount Dora Christian Academy in Mount Dora, Florida from 2015 to 2019 and was the school's head football coach in 2016. He resigned in January 2019 to take a job as assistant athletic director and chief of staff for the football team at Liberty University in Lynchburg, Virginia. Nichols is now the vice president of development for Liberty.

Nichols was born in Camden, Arkansas and grew up in Searcy, Arkansas, where he went to Searcy High School and graduated from Harding University.

== Head coaching record ==
=== College ===
Year	Team	Overall	Conference	Standing	Bowl/playoffs
Faulkner Eagles (NAIA independent) (2007)
2007	Faulkner	0–9			
Faulkner Eagles (Mid-South Conference) (2008)
2008	Faulkner	2–9	0–5	6th (West)	
Faulkner:		2–18	0–5		
Total:		2–18			

=== High school ===
Year	Team	Overall	Conference	Standing	Bowl/playoffs
Mount Dora Christian Bulldogs () (2016)
2016	Mount Dora Christian	5–5	3–1	2nd	
Mount Dora Christian:		5–5	3–1		
Total:		5–5			
