= 2024 MAC Football Championship Game =

- Conference championship
Ohio Bobcats	Miami RedHawks
(9–3)	(8–4)
38	3
Head coach: Tim Albin	Head coach: Chuck Martin
	1	2	3	4	Total
Ohio	7	14	10	7	38
Miami	3	0	0	0	3
- Date: December 7, 2024
- Season: 2024
- Stadium: Ford Field
- Location: Detroit, Michigan
- Referee: Andrew Speciale
- Attendance: 15,478

United States TV coverage
- Network: ESPN
- Announcers: Anish Shroff (play-by-play), Andre Ware (analyst), and Paul Carcaterra (sideline)

2024 Mid-American Conference football standings
	Conf.			Overall
Team	W		L	W		L
Ohio y$	7	–	1	11	–	3
Miami (OH) y	7	–	1	9	–	5
Buffalo	6	–	2	9	–	4
Bowling Green	6	–	2	7	–	6
Western Michigan	5	–	3	6	–	7
Toledo	4	–	4	8	–	5
Northern Illinois	4	–	4	8	–	5
Akron	3	–	5	4	–	8
Eastern Michigan	2	–	6	5	–	7
Central Michigan	2	–	6	4	–	8
Ball State	2	–	6	3	–	9
Kent State	0	–	8	0	–	12
Championship: Ohio 38, Miami (OH) 3
$ – Conference champion; y – Championship game participant

The 2024 MAC Football Championship Game was a college football conference championship game played on December 7, 2024, at Ford Field in Detroit, Michigan. It was the 28th edition of the MAC Football Championship Game and determined the champion of the Mid-American Conference (MAC) for the 2024 season. The game began at 12:00 p.m. EST and air on ESPN.

For the first time, the participants were not determined by division winners. Following the 2023 season, the MAC eliminated divisions and the game will now feature the teams with the best conference records. A new tiebreaker system was established to compare teams with the same conference record. For the first time since 1968, Ohio won the MAC Championship, winning 38–3. Parker Navarro won Offensive Player of the Game with 235 passing yards with 2 touchdowns, 73 rushing yards, and 2 touchdowns. Bradley Weaver was Defensive Player of the Game. Gianni Spetic hit a 53-yard field goal and won Special Teams Player of the Game.

== Venue ==
The 2024 MAC title game was held at Ford Field for the 21st consecutive season. The venue, located in downtown Detroit at 2000 Brush St., is the home of the Detroit Lions of the National Football League (NFL) and has a seating capacity for football of 65,000.

== Teams ==
For the first time in its history, the game featured the teams with the best conference records without regard to divisions. Ohio and Miami previously met as part of their Battle of the Bricks in-state rivalry in their 100th meeting on October 19, with Miami winning 30–20. Both teams enter the game without having lost since the first meeting This will be the first time the schools have played twice in the same season. Entering the championship game, Miami leads the rivalry series 56–42–2. Ohio has won 13 of the last 18 but Miami has won the last two. In addition to the win earlier in the 2024 season, their win over Ohio during the 2023 season handed the Bobcats their second conference loss and vaulted the RedHawks to the 2023 MAC Football Championship Game where they defeated Toledo.

=== Ohio ===
Ohio clinched a berth by beating Ball State on November 29, 2024. Ohio is looking for their first MAC Championship since 1968; Ohio is playing in their sixth MAC Championship Game (2006, 2009, 2011, 2016, 2022).

Ohio entered the season coming off back-to-back to win seasons and a fifth straight bowl win. They suffered huge transfer losses in the offseason and entered the year ranked 133 out of 134 FBS teams in returning production as determined by the SP+ rankings. Ohio opened the season 2–2. In non-conference play they lost to power conference opponents Syracuse and Kentucky with wins over South Alabama and Morgan State. They opened conference play with wins over Akron and Central Michigan before losing to Miami. Following that, they ended the regular season having won five straight.

Ohio's nine-win season was accomplished with a run-oriented offense led by dual threat quarterback Paker Navarro who won MAC offensive player of the week the last three weeks of the regular season and four times overall. The rushing attack was led by Anthony Tyus who entered the game second in the MAC with 960 yards rushing. Coleman Owen was one of only two thousand-yard receivers in the conference. Ohio's 394 yards per game of total offense led the MAC and their 305 yards allowed on defense was second in the conference.

=== Miami (OH) ===
Miami clinched a berth by beating Bowling Green on November 29, 2024. Miami is playing in their seventh MAC Championship Game (2003, 2004, 2007, 2010, 2019, 2023), having previously won it four times, including in 2023; a win by Miami would make them the first repeat MAC Championship Game winner since Northern Illinois won the 2011 and 2012 games.

Miami entered the season as the defending MAC champion and preseason favorite. Miami started slowly as they opened the season with three consecutive non-conference losses to power conference opponents Northwestern, Cincinnati and Notre Dame. They then defeated Massachusetts and opened MAC play with a loss to Toledo. After starting 1–4, they entered the game on a seven game winning streak.

Miami was quarterbacked by sixth year starter and first-team all-MAC quarterback Brett Gabbert. Their offense featured the MAC's only thousand-yard rusher in Keyon Mozee. Their defense led the MAC with 17.3 points allowed per game was led by returning 2023 MAC Defensive Player of the Year Matt Salopek.

== Game summary ==
Ohio Bobcats (9–3) vs Miami RedHawks (8–4)

Quarter	1	2	3	4	Total
Bobcats	7	14	10	7	38
RedHawks	3	0	0	0	3

at Ford Field, Detroit, Michigan

- Date: Saturday December 7, 2024
- Game time: 12:00 p.m.
- Game weather: Indoor
- Game attendance: 15,478
- Referee: Andrew Speciale
- TV announcers (ESPN): Anish Shroff (play-by-play), Andre Ware (analyst), and Paul Carcaterra (sideline)
- boxscore

Game information

First quarter

- (8:53) M-OH – Dom Dzioban 29 yard field goal (Drive: 11 plays, 64 yards, 6:07; Miami 3–0)
- (3:16) OHIO – Parker Navarro 4 yard rush, Gianni Spetic kick (Drive: 11 plays, 75 yards, 5:37; Ohio 7–3)

Second quarter

- (5:29) OHIO – Parker Navarro 1 yard rush, Gianni Spetic kick (Drive: 18 plays, 82 yards, 10:14; Ohio 14–3)
- (0:52) OHIO – Mason Williams 21 yard pass from Parker Navarro, Gianni Spetic kick (Drive: 10 plays, 75 yards, 3:27; Ohio 21–3)

Third quarter

- (12:39) OHIO – Coleman Owen 25 yard pass from Parker Navarro, Gianni Spetic kick (Drive: 6 plays, 75 yards, 2:21; Ohio 28–3)
- (3:35) OHIO – Gianni Spetic 53 yard field goal (Drive: 11 plays, 31 yards, 6:40; Ohio 31–3)

Fourth quarter

- (6:45) OHIO – Anthony Tyus III 21 yard rush, Gianni Spetic kick (Drive: 9 plays, 80 yards, 5:37; Ohio 38–3)

Statistics	OHIO	M-OH
First downs	32	11
Plays–yards	73–467	48–189
Rushes–yards	46–232	23–62
Passing yards	235	127
Passing: comp–att–int	20–27–0	14–25–1
Turnovers		
Time of possession	37:35	22:25

Team	Category	Player	Statistics
Ohio	Passing	Parker Navarro	20/27, 235 yards, 2 TD
Ohio	Rushing	Anthony Tyus III	27 carries, 151 yards, TD
Ohio	Receiving	Coleman Owen	5 receptions, 73 yards, TD
Miami	Passing	Brett Gabbert	14/25, 127 yards, INT
Miami	Rushing	Keyon Mozee	11 carries, 28 yards
Miami	Receiving	Javon Tracy	7 receptions, 58 yards
