= Anthony Tyus III =

American football player (born 2003)

No. 34 – Carolina Panthers
- Position: Running back
- Roster status: Active

Personal information
- Born: March 20, 2003 (age 23); Portage, Michigan, U.S.
- Listed height: 6 ft 1 in (1.85 m)
- Listed weight: 222 lb (101 kg)

Career information
- High school: Portage Northern (Portage, Michigan)
- College: Northwestern (2021–2023); Ohio (2024)
- NFL draft: 2025: undrafted

Career history
- Detroit Lions (2025)*; Seattle Seahawks (2025)*; Carolina Panthers (2025–present)
- * Offseason or practice squad member only

Awards and highlights
- Second team All-MAC (2024)

Career NFL statistics as of Week 6, 2026
- Returns: 5
- Return yards: 127
- Stats at Pro Football Reference

Anthony Tyus III (born March 20, 2003) is an American professional football running back for the Carolina Panthers of the National Football League (NFL). He played college football for the Northwestern Wildcats and Ohio Bobcats.

== Early life ==
Tyus III attended Portage Northern High School in Portage, Michigan. As a junior, he rushed for over 1,800 yards and 19 touchdowns on 199 carries. As a senior, Tyus III ran for 1,801 yards and 22 touchdowns on 174 carries, while recording 54 tackles with five and a half being for a loss, a sack, two interceptions, two fumble recoveries, and a forced fumble. Coming out of high school, he was rated as a three-star recruit and committed to play college football for the Northwestern Wildcats over other schools such as Cincinnati, Iowa State, Michigan State, and Indiana.

== College career ==
=== Northwestern ===
In his three-year career with the Wildcats from 2021 through 2023, Tyus III appeared in 31 games, where he rushed 119 times for 504 yards and two touchdowns, while also hauling in ten passes for 81 yards and a touchdown. After the 2023 season, he entered his name into the NCAA transfer portal.

=== Ohio ===
Tyus III transferred to play for the Ohio Bobcats. In the 2024 season opener, he ran for a career-high 202 yards and two touchdowns on 16 carries in a loss to Syracuse. In week 13, Tyus III ran for 125 yards and a touchdown in a victory over Toledo. In the 2024 MAC Football Championship Game, he ran for 151 yards and a touchdown as he helped the Bobcats to a championship win over Miami RedHawks. Tyus III finished the 2024 season with 1,234 rushing yards and nine touchdowns on 237 carries, after which he declared for the 2025 NFL draft.

== Professional career ==
Pre-draft measurables
| Height | Weight | Arm length | Hand span | Wingspan | 40-yard dash | 10-yard split | 20-yard split | 20-yard shuttle | Three-cone drill | Vertical jump | Broad jump | Bench press |
|---|---|---|---|---|---|---|---|---|---|---|---|---|
| 6 ft 0 7/8 in (1.85 m) | 220 lb (100 kg) | 31 5/8 in (0.80 m) | 9 1/8 in (0.23 m) | 6 ft 2 3/4 in (1.90 m) | 4.59 s | 1.58 s | 2.64 s | 4.44 s | 7.23 s | 33.5 in (0.85 m) | 10 ft 5 in (3.18 m) | 19 reps |
All values from Pro Day

=== Detroit Lions ===
After not being selected in the 2025 NFL draft, Tyus signed with the Detroit Lions as an undrafted free agent. However, he would be waived by the team on July 17, 2025.

=== Seattle Seahawks ===
On August 5, 2025, Tyus signed with the Seattle Seahawks. He was waived on August 26 as part of final roster cuts and re-signed to the practice squad the next day Tyus was waived from the practice squad on August 28.

=== Carolina Panthers ===
On October 1, 2025, Tyus signed with the Carolina Panthers' practice squad. He signed a reserve/future contract with Carolina on January 12, 2026.

On August 30, 2026, Tyus was waived as part of final roster cuts; he was re–signed to the team's practice squad the next day. On September 30, he was promoted to the active roster. On October 7, he was waived and re-signed to the practice squad the next day. He was signed to their active roster on October 21.

== Personal life ==
His father, Anthony Tyus played college football for the Central Michigan Chippewas.
