= Battle of the Bricks =

American college football rivalry

- Miami RedHawks Ohio Bobcats
- Sport: Football
- First meeting: October 17, 1908; Miami, 5–0
- Latest meeting: November 10, 2026; Miami, 34–17
- Next meeting: 2027

Statistics
- Total meetings: 103
- All-time series: Miami leads, 57–44–2
- Largest victory: Miami, 45–0 (1909)
- Longest win streak: Miami, 8 (1945–1952)
- Longest unbeaten streak: Miami, 15 (1945–1959)
- Current win streak: Miami, 1 (2026–present)

Locations of Miami and Ohio

The Battle of the Bricks is the name given to the Miami–Ohio football rivalry. It is a college football rivalry between the Miami RedHawks of Miami University (1809) and the Ohio Bobcats of Ohio University (1804), the two oldest universities in the State of Ohio. Both schools are members of the Mid-American Conference. Through the 2025 season, the two teams have met 102 times on the football field, with Miami holding a 56–44–2 edge in the all-time series. Ohio University players and staff receive a mug with game information for each rivalry win over Miami. The title "Battle of the Bricks" originally referred to football games, but has since been used broadly to cover any contest between the two complementary universities.

== Game results ==
Miami victories	Ohio victories	Tie games

No.	Date	Location	Winner	Score
1	October 17, 1908	Oxford, OH	Miami	5–0
2	October 16, 1909	Oxford, OH	Miami	45–0
3	November 9, 1912	Oxford, OH	Miami	18–6
4	November 8, 1913	Oxford, OH	Miami	44–6
5	October 10, 1914	Athens, OH	Ohio	6–0
6	November 13, 1915	Oxford, OH	Miami	13–7
7	November 3, 1928	Oxford, OH	Miami	20–13
8	November 2, 1929	Athens, OH	Ohio	14–0
9	October 25, 1930	Oxford, OH	Ohio	27–6
10	November 14, 1931	Athens, OH	Ohio	13–0
11	October 22, 1932	Oxford, OH	Miami	16–0
12	October 21, 1933	Oxford, OH	Ohio	6–0
13	October 20, 1934	Oxford, OH	Miami	7–0
14	November 2, 1935	Athens, OH	Ohio	20–0
15	October 24, 1936	Oxford, OH	Miami	3–0
16	October 16, 1937	Athens, OH	Ohio	19–0
17	November 5, 1938	Oxford, OH	Ohio	20–12
18	November 11, 1939	Athens, OH	Ohio	20–7
19	November 2, 1940	Oxford, OH	Ohio	27–0
20	November 1, 1941	Athens, OH	Ohio	26–0
21	October 31, 1942	Oxford, OH	Ohio	39–13
22	October 20, 1945	Oxford, OH	Miami	34–0
23	October 26, 1946	Athens, OH	Miami	23–14
24	October 25, 1947	Oxford, OH	Miami	21–0
25	October 23, 1948	Athens, OH	Miami	21–0
26	October 22, 1949	Oxford, OH	Miami	26–0
27	October 28, 1950	Athens, OH	Miami	28–20
28	October 20, 1951	Oxford, OH	Miami	7–0
29	October 25, 1952	Athens, OH	Miami	20–0
30	October 24, 1953	Oxford, OH	Tie	7–7
31	October 23, 1954	Athens, OH	Miami	46–13
32	October 22, 1955	Oxford, OH	Miami	34–7
33	October 20, 1956	Athens, OH	Miami	16–7
34	October 19, 1957	Oxford, OH	Miami	26–0
35	October 18, 1958	Athens, OH	Miami	14–10
36	October 24, 1959	Oxford, OH	Miami	24–0
37	October 22, 1960	Athens, OH	Ohio	21–0
38	October 21, 1961	Oxford, OH	Ohio	28–18
39	October 20, 1962	Athens, OH	Ohio	12–6
40	October 26, 1963	Oxford, OH	Ohio	13–10
41	October 24, 1964	Athens, OH	Ohio	10–7
42	October 23, 1965	Oxford, OH	Miami	34–0
43	October 22, 1966	Athens, OH	Miami	33–13
44	October 21, 1967	Oxford, OH	Miami	22–15
45	October 19, 1968	Athens, OH	Ohio	24–7
46	October 18, 1969	Athens, OH	Miami	24–21
47	October 17, 1970	Athens, OH	Ohio	23–22
48	October 16, 1971	Oxford, OH	Ohio	3–0
49	October 14, 1972	Oxford, OH	Miami	31–7
50	October 13, 1973	Oxford, OH	#20 Miami	10–6
51	October 12, 1974	Athens, OH	Miami	31–3
52	October 18, 1975	Oxford, OH	Miami	17–9
53	October 16, 1976	Athens, OH	Ohio	28–14

No.	Date	Location	Winner	Score
54	October 15, 1977	Oxford, OH	Miami	28–24
55	November 4, 1978	Athens, OH	Miami	31–16
56	October 13, 1979	Oxford, OH	Ohio	9–7
57	October 18, 1980	Athens, OH	Ohio	17–7
58	October 24, 1981	Oxford, OH	Miami	40–14
59	October 23, 1982	Athens, OH	Ohio	20–0
60	November 5, 1983	Oxford, OH	Ohio	17–14
61	November 3, 1984	Athens, OH	Ohio	24–19
62	October 5, 1985	Oxford, OH	Miami	29–22
63	October 4, 1986	Athens, OH	Miami	34–14
64	October 17, 1987	Oxford, OH	Miami	10–9
65	October 15, 1988	Athens, OH	Ohio	38–21
66	October 14, 1989	Oxford, OH	Tie	22–22
67	October 13, 1990	Athens, OH	Miami	40–18
68	October 19, 1991	Oxford, OH	Miami	34–0
69	October 17, 1992	Athens, OH	Miami	23–21
70	October 23, 1993	Oxford, OH	Ohio	22–20
71	October 15, 1994	Athens, OH	Miami	31–10
72	November 11, 1995	Athens, OH	Miami	30–2
73	November 9, 1996	Oxford, OH	Miami	24–8
74	November 8, 1997	Athens, OH	Miami	45–21
75	October 31, 1998	Oxford, OH	Miami	35–21
76	November 13, 1999	Athens, OH	Ohio	40–28
77	November 4, 2000	Oxford, OH	Miami	27–24
78	October 20, 2001	Athens, OH	Miami	36–24
79	November 2, 2002	Oxford, OH	Miami	38–20
80	November 22, 2003	Athens, OH	#18 Miami	49–31
81	September 18, 2004	Oxford, OH	Miami	40–20
82	November 21, 2005	Athens, OH	Miami	38–7
83	November 24, 2006	Oxford, OH	Ohio	34–24
84	November 24, 2007	Athens, OH	Ohio	38–29
85	November 28, 2008	Oxford, OH	Ohio	41–26
86	October 17, 2009	Athens, OH	Ohio	28–7
87	October 23, 2010	Oxford, OH	Ohio	34–13
88	November 22, 2011	Athens, OH	Ohio	21–14
89	October 27, 2012	Oxford, OH	Miami	23–20
90	October 26, 2013	Athens, OH	Ohio	41–16
91	November 25, 2014	Oxford, OH	Ohio	24–21
92	October 10, 2015	Athens, OH	Ohio	34–3
93	October 1, 2016	Oxford, OH	Ohio	17–7
94	October 31, 2017	Athens, OH	Ohio	45–28
95	November 7, 2018	Oxford, OH	Miami	30–28
96	November 6, 2019	Athens, OH	Miami	24–21
97	November 2, 2021	Athens, OH	Ohio	35–33
98	November 8, 2022	Oxford, OH	Ohio	37–21
99	October 28, 2023	Athens, OH	Miami	30–16
100	October 19, 2024	Oxford, OH	Miami	30–20
101	December 7, 2024	Detroit, MI	Ohio	38–3
102	November 4, 2025	Athens, OH	Ohio	24–20
103	November 10, 2026	Oxford, OH	Miami	34–17
Series: Miami leads 57–44–2
The 2020 meeting was canceled due to the COVID-19 pandemic. 2nd game in 2024 season was the MAC Championship game

== See also ==
- List of NCAA college football rivalry games
- List of most-played college football series in NCAA Division I
