= Reggie Virgil =

American football player (born 2004)

No. 82 – Arizona Cardinals
- Position: Wide receiver
- Roster status: Active

Personal information
- Born: May 14, 2004 (age 22); Apopka, Florida, U.S.
- Listed height: 6 ft 3 in (1.91 m)
- Listed weight: 187 lb (85 kg)

Career information
- High school: Mount Dora Christian (Mount Dora, Florida)
- College: Miami (OH) (2022–2024); Texas Tech (2025)
- NFL draft: 2026: 5th round, 143rd overall pick

Career history
- Arizona Cardinals (2026–present)

Awards and highlights
- Second-team All-MAC (2024)

Career NFL statistics as of Week Week 9, 2026
- Receptions: 3
- Receiving Yards: 54
- Stats at Pro Football Reference

Reginald Virgil (born May 14, 2004) is an American professional football wide receiver for the Arizona Cardinals of the National Football League (NFL). He played college football for the Miami RedHawks and the Texas Tech Red Raiders and was selected by the Cardinals in the fifth round of the 2026 NFL draft.

== Early life ==
Virgil was born on May 14, 2004 in Apopka, Florida. He attended Mount Dora Christian Academy in Mount Dora, Florida. Coming out of high school, he committed to play college football for the Miami RedHawks.

== College career ==
As a freshman in 2022, Virgil caught one pass for 28 yards. In 2023, he recorded one reception for 34 yards and a touchdown in 12 games played. In week 7 of the 2024 season, Virgil hauled in three passes for 113 yards and two touchdowns in a win over Eastern Michigan. During the 2024 season, he hauled in 41 passes for 816 yards and nine touchdowns, earning second-team all-MAC honors. After the season, Virgil entered his name into the NCAA transfer portal.

Virgil transferred to play for the Texas Tech Red Raiders. In week one of the 2025 season, he scored the team's first touchdown of the season on a nine-yard reception. In week 12 of the 2025 season, Virgil notched 107 total yards and three touchdowns on seven touches in a win over UCF.

=== College statistics ===
Season	Team	GP	Receiving				Rushing			
Season	Team	GP	Rec	Yds	Avg	TD	Att	Yds	Avg	TD
2022	Miami (OH)	11	1	28	28.0	0	0	0	0.0	0
2023	Miami (OH)	12	1	34	34.0	1	0	0	0.0	0
2024	Miami (OH)	13	41	816	19.9	9	0	0	0.0	0
2025	Texas Tech	13	55	676	12.3	6	2	35	17.5	2
Career		49	98	1,554	15.9	16	2	35	17.5	2

== Professional career ==
Pre-draft measurables
Height	Weight	Arm length	Hand span	Wingspan	40-yard dash	10-yard split	20-yard split	Vertical jump	Broad jump
6 ft 2 5/8 in (1.90 m)	187 lb (85 kg)	31 1/4 in (0.79 m)	9 1/4 in (0.23 m)	6 ft 3 7/8 in (1.93 m)	4.57 s	1.58 s	2.66 s	36.0 in (0.91 m)	10 ft 7 in (3.23 m)
All values from NFL Combine

Virgil was selected by the Arizona Cardinals in the fifth round with the 143rd overall pick of the 2026 NFL draft.
