= Mount Dora Christian Academy =

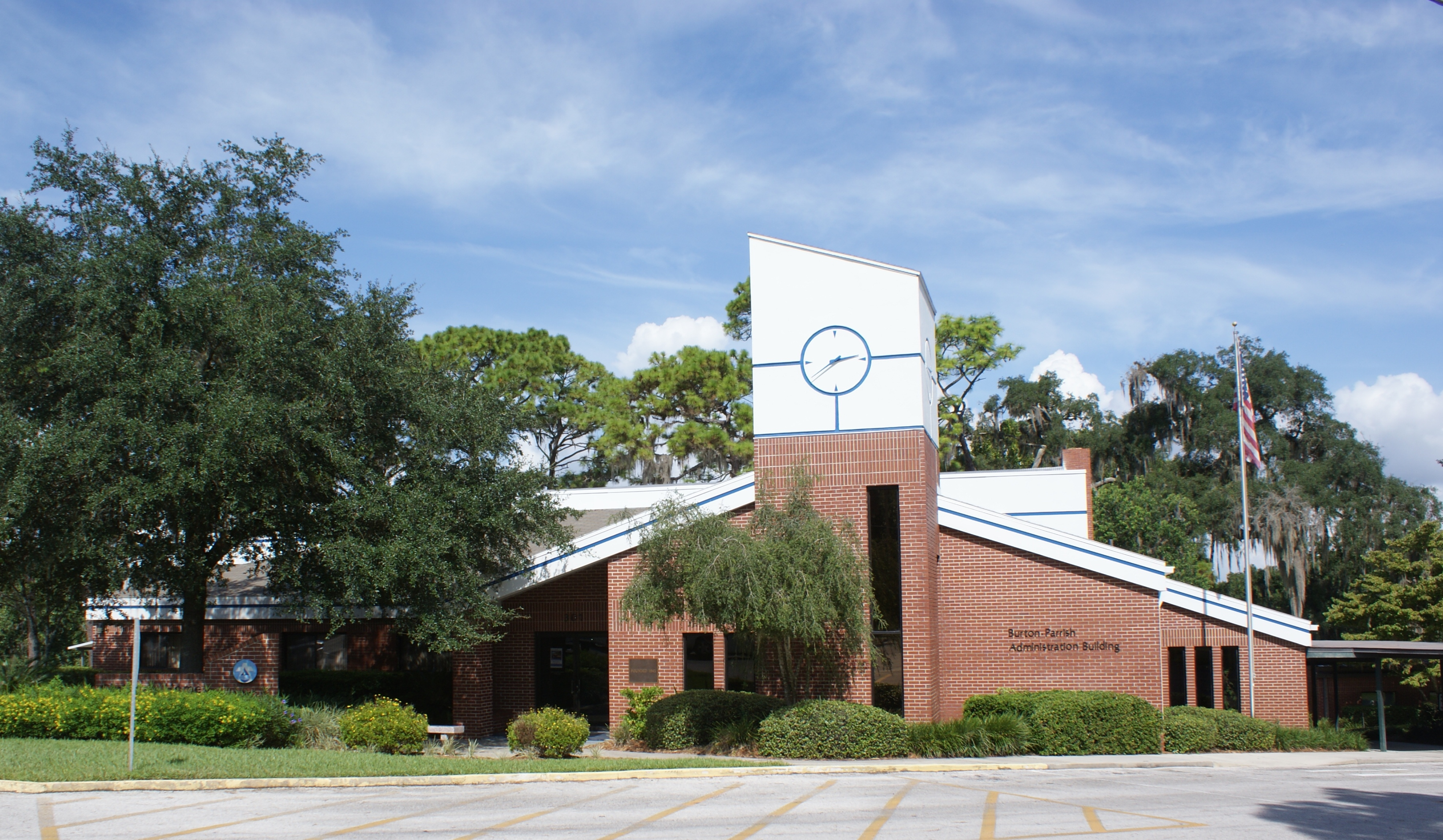

Location
- 301 West 13th Avenue; Mount Dora, Lake, Florida 32757; United States

Information
- Other name: Mount Dora Bible
- Former name: Christian Home & Bible School
- Type: Private School
- Motto: Faith-Driven World Changers
- Religious affiliation: Christian — Church of Christ
- Established: 1945
- Founder: W. O. Norton
- Oversight: CH&BS Board of Trustees
- President: Sam Smith
- Principal: Secondary: Sara Hill Elementary: Cleta Horton
- Head of school: Laws Rushing II
- Grades: PreK-12th grade
- Enrollment: 860
- Student to teacher ratio: 13-to-1
- Campus size: 70+ acres
- Athletics conference: FHSAA 1A/2A/Independent
- Sports: 33 athletic teams
- Mascot: Bulldog
- Yearbook: Pinelogue
- Affiliation: Church of Christ
- Website: https://www.mdcacademy.org/

Mount Dora Christian Academy (formerly Christian Home and Bible School) is a co-educational PreK-12 private Christian school in Mount Dora, Florida, United States. Founded in 1945, Mount Dora Christian Academy is affiliated with, but not directed or funded by, the Churches of Christ.

Mount Dora Christian Academy is accredited by the Florida Council of Independent Schools (FCIS), Cognia (formerly known as AdvancedED), and the National Christian School Association (NCSA). MDCA is a part of the Florida High School Athletic Association (FHSAA) and is also an ACT, PSAT, and CLEP testing site.

== Athletic programs ==
Thirty-three teams including, Girls and Boys Cross Country, Cheerleading, Girls and Boys Golf, Girls Volleyball, Girls and Boys Weightlifting, Boys and Girls Soccer, Girls and Boys Basketball, Baseball, Softball, Boys and Girls Tennis, and Boys and Girls Track and Field

== Notable alumni ==
- Reggie Virgil is an NFL wide receiver for the Arizona Cardinals and a former college football wide receiver for the Texas Tech Red Raiders
- Inbee Park is a former LPGA world number one women's golfer
- Jesiah Pierre is a former college football linebacker for the UCF Knights
- Isaiah Bryant is a current college football wide receiver for the Navy Midshipmen
