= Marcus Ray =

American football player and coach (born 1976)

Biographical details
- Born: August 14, 1976 (age 50); Columbus, Ohio, U.S.

Playing career
- 1994–1998: Michigan
- 1999: Oakland Raiders
- 2000: Scottish Claymores
- Position: Defensive back

Coaching career (HC unless noted)
- 2001: Lin-McKin HS (OH) (co-DC/DB)
- 2002: Eastmoor Acad. (OH) (AHC/DC)
- 2003: Northland HS (OH) (AHC/DC)
- 2004–2006: Ohio Dominican (DB)
- 2007: Michigan (GA)
- 2008: Central Michigan (GA)
- 2009: Ohio Dominican (assistant)
- 2010: Mifflin HS (OH) (DC)

Accomplishments and honors

Championships
- National (1997)

Awards
- Second-team All-American (1997); First-team All-Big Ten (1997); Second-team All-Big Ten (1996)

Marcus Kenyon Ray (born August 14, 1976) is an American football coach and former player. In college, he played for the Michigan Wolverines football team and was a member of the 1997 squad that won a national championship. Ray played professionally in the National Football League (NFL) for the Oakland Raiders and for the Scottish Claymores of NFL Europe. He has since coached football at the high school and college levels.

== Early life and college career ==
A native of Columbus, Ohio, Ray attended high school at Eastmoor Academy. He played college football at the University of Michigan, red-shirting in 1994 before earning varsity letters and wearing jersey #29 in each of the next four seasons (1995–1998). In 1995, Ray started six games at free safety. The following season in 1996, he started all 12 of Michigan's games at strong safety and earned All-Big Ten Conference honors. Ray intercepted three passes and made 100 total tackles on the season, tied for second best on the team with Jarrett Irons behind leader, Sam Sword.

Ray started all 12 games at strong safety for the 1997 Michigan Wolverines, who won a national championship after completing a 12–0 season with a victory in the Rose Bowl. That season, the Wolverines set the NCAA Division I-A season record for fewest yards allowed per completion by a team. Ray intercepted five passes, second on the team to Heisman Trophy winner, Charles Woodson. His 71 total tackles and 44 solo stops were each third on the team behind those tallied by Sword and Dhani Jones. Ray appeared on the December 1, 1997 cover of Sports Illustrated in an action shot from that season's Michigan – Ohio State football game with Ohio State Buckeyes wide receiver, David Boston. Ray again earned all-conference honors, and was a second-team All-American selection by the Associated Press and Sporting News. The 1998 consensus preseason All-American was selected as a co-captain of the 1998 Michigan Wolverines football team, but he was suspended for six games by the NCAA for associating with a sports agent. As a result, he only started three games in 1998. Ray completed his Michigan football career with ten interceptions, now seventh most in program history. He tallied 229 total tackles including 148 solo stops as a Wolverine.

== Professional playing and coaching career ==
Ray appeared in eight National Football League (NFL) games for the Oakland Raiders in 1999. During the 2000 season, he played with the Scottish Claymores in NFL Europe, where he contributed to the team's efforts that took them to the World Bowl.

Ray served as an assistant coach and defensive coordinator for various high schools in Columbus, Ohio between 2001 and 2003. In 2004, he began a three-year tenure as defensive backs coach at Ohio Dominican University. In 2007, he served as a graduate assistant at his alma mater, Michigan. The following year, he was a graduate assistant for the Central Michigan Chippewas football team. Ray returned to Ohio Dominican as an assistant coach for a season in 2009. In 2010, he became the defensive coordinator at Mifflin High School in Columbus.

== Writing ==
In 2010, Ray wrote a book of inspirational thoughts entitled, Rays of Light, Volume 1 "Let There Be Light". He published it in 2011 through his company, TEAM RAYROC LLC, of which he is CEO and president.
