= Javon Tracy =

American football player (born 2003)

- Tracy after 2026 game vs EIU

No. 11 – Minnesota Golden Gophers
- Position: Wide receiver
- Class: (redshirt) Senior

Personal information
- Born: September 21, 2003 (age 23)
- Listed height: 6 ft 0 in (1.83 m)
- Listed weight: 205 lb (93 kg)

Career information
- High school: Decatur Central (Indianapolis)
- College: Miami (OH) (2022–2024); Minnesota (2025–present)

Awards and highlights
- First-team All-MAC (2024)
- Stats at ESPN

Javon Tracy (born September 21, 2003) is an American football wide receiver for the Minnesota Golden Gophers. He previously played for the Miami RedHawks.

== Early life ==
Tracy attended Decatur Central High School in Indianapolis, Indiana. He was rated as a three-star recruit by 247Sports and committed to play college football for the for the Miami RedHawks over offers from Indiana State, Iowa, Western Michigan, and Youngstown State.

== College career ==
=== Miami (Ohio) ===
Tracy enrolled at Miami University on June 1, 2022. As a redshirt freshman he played in two games. The following year in 2023, he played in 14 games and caught 22 receptions for 348 yards and two touchdowns. In 2024, Tracy played in 13 games and had 47 receptions for 818 yards and seven touchdowns, earning a First-team All-MAC selection. After the season, he entered the NCAA transfer portal.

=== Minnesota ===
Tracy transferred to play for the Minnesota Golden Gophers. During the 2025 season, he totaled 37 receptions for 454 yards and six touchdowns. In week one of the 2026 season, Tracy hauled in five passes for 98 yards, while also returning four punts for 167 yards and two touchdowns in a win over Eastern Illinois.

== Personal life ==
Javon is the younger brother of NFL running back Tyrone Tracy Jr..
