= Bahamas Bowl =

Annual U.S. college football game in Nassau, Bahamas

- Stadium: Thomas Robinson Stadium
- Location: Nassau, Bahamas
- Operated: 2014–2025
- Conference tie-ins: Conference USA (2014–2025 ) Mid-American Conference (2014-2025)
- Payout: US$225,000 (2019)
- Website: bahamasbowl.com

Sponsors
- Popeyes (2014–2016); Elk Grove Village, Illinois (2018–2019); HomeTown Lenders (2022)

Former names
- Popeyes Bahamas Bowl (2014–2016); Makers Wanted Bahamas Bowl (2018–2019); HomeTown Lenders Bahamas Bowl (2022); Bahamas Bowl (2017, 2020–2021)

2024 season matchup
- Buffalo vs. Liberty (Buffalo 26–7)

2025 season matchup
- Not played

The Bahamas Bowl is an NCAA Division I Football Bowl Subdivision college football bowl game that has been contested nine times since 2014 in Nassau, Bahamas, at the 15,000-seat Thomas Robinson Stadium. The bowl has tie-ins with the Mid-American Conference and Conference USA.

The game was not played following the 2020 season, due to the COVID-19 pandemic, nor the 2023 and 2025 seasons, due to stadium renovations.

For the December 2023 edition, the game was replaced by a bowl game at Jerry Richardson Stadium in Charlotte, North Carolina, due to renovations at Thomas Robinson Stadium. This edition was known as the Famous Toastery Bowl, reflecting the title sponsor of the relocated game.

The Bahamas Bowl was not played following the 2025 football season; future plans for the bowl are unclear. Instead, the Xbox Bowl was played at Ford Center at the Star in Frisco, Texas.

== History ==
Prime Minister's Trophy

The inaugural edition of the Bahamas Bowl, played in 2014, was the first major (FBS or historical equivalent) bowl game to be played outside the United States and Canada between two U.S. teams since the January 1, 1937, Bacardi Bowl in Havana, Cuba. The game featured teams from the Mid-American Conference and Conference USA; that conference matchup has continued annually. In July 2019, the MAC announced a continuation of its tie-in with the bowl through the 2025–26 football season.

From its inception to 2017, the game was sponsored by the Popeyes Louisiana Kitchen restaurant franchise and officially known as the Popeyes Bahamas Bowl. After Restaurant Brands International acquired Popeyes in 2017, they declined to renew sponsorship. Elk Grove Village, Illinois—"home to the largest industrial park in the United States"—picked up title sponsorship in 2018, with the bowl using the official naming of Makers Wanted Bahamas Bowl. The name lasted until Elk Grove Village ended its sponsorship in March 2020. On May 25, 2022, it was announced that HomeTown Lenders would be the new title sponsor of the game.

The winning team is presented with a trophy, since 2016 named the Prime Minister's Trophy. The current trophy, in use since the 2018 playing, is approximately 30 inches (76 cm) tall and weighs nearly 30 pounds (14 kg).

On October 2, 2020, the 2020 edition of the bowl was cancelled due to the COVID-19 pandemic and related travel restrictions.

After a one-year hiatus, the bowl returned to the Bahamas for the edition following the 2024 season, and was played in January for the first time.

In early June 2025, the Bahamas Bowl was not included in the announced lineup of bowls scheduled to follow the 2025 season. Future plans for the bowl are unclear.

== Game results ==
Date	Bowl name	Winning team		Losing team		Attendance
December 24, 2014	Bahamas Bowl	Western Kentucky	49	Central Michigan	48	13,667
December 24, 2015	Bahamas Bowl	Western Michigan	45	Middle Tennessee	31	13,123
December 23, 2016	Bahamas Bowl	Old Dominion	24	Eastern Michigan	20	13,422
December 22, 2017	Bahamas Bowl	Ohio	41	UAB	6	13,585
December 21, 2018	Bahamas Bowl	FIU	35	Toledo	32	13,510
December 20, 2019	Bahamas Bowl	Buffalo	31	Charlotte	9	13,547
2020	Cancelled due to the COVID-19 pandemic					
December 17, 2021	Bahamas Bowl	Middle Tennessee	31	Toledo	24	13,596
December 16, 2022	Bahamas Bowl	UAB	24	Miami (OH)	20	12,172
2023	Not played due to stadium renovations					
January 4, 2025	Bahamas Bowl	Buffalo	26	Liberty	7	4,610
2025	Not played					

== MVPs ==
Year	Offensive MVP			Defensive MVP			Ref.
Year	Player	Team	Pos.	Player	Team	Pos.	Ref.
2014	Brandon Doughty	Western Kentucky	QB	Derik Overstreet	Western Kentucky	DL	
2015	Jamauri Bogan	Western Michigan	RB	Grant DePalma	Western Michigan	LB	
2016	Ray Lawry	Old Dominion	RB	TJ Ricks	Old Dominion	LB	
2017	Dorian Brown	Ohio	RB	Javon Hagan	Ohio	FS	
2018	Christian Alexander	FIU	QB	Edwin Freeman	FIU	LB	
2019	Jaret Patterson	Buffalo	RB	Malcolm Koonce	Buffalo	DE	
2021	Nicholas Vattiato	Middle Tennessee	QB	DQ Thomas	Middle Tennessee	LB	
2022	Trea Shropshire	UAB	WR	Michael Fairbanks II	UAB	LB	
2025	Al-Jay Henderson	Buffalo	RB	Red Murdock	Buffalo	LB	

== Most appearances ==
Updated through the January 2025 edition (10 games, 20 total appearances).

Teams with multiple appearances

Team	Appearances	Record	Win pct.
Buffalo	2	2–0	1.000
Middle Tennessee	2	1–1	.500
UAB	2	1–1	.500
Toledo	2	0–2	.000

Teams with a single appearance

Won (5): FIU, Ohio, Old Dominion, Western Kentucky, Western Michigan
Lost (5): Central Michigan, Charlotte, Eastern Michigan, Liberty, Miami (OH)

== Appearances by conference ==
Updated through the January 2025 edition (10 games, 20 total appearances).

Conference	Record				Appearances by season	
Conference	Games	W	L	Win pct.	Won	Lost
C-USA	9	5	4	.556	2014, 2016, 2018, 2021, 2022	2015, 2017, 2019, 2024*
MAC	9	4	5	.444	2015, 2017, 2019, 2024*	2014, 2016, 2018, 2021, 2022

- Games marked with an asterisk (*) were played in January of the following calendar year.

== Game records ==
Team	Record, Team vs. Opponent	Year
Most points scored (one team)	49, Western Kentucky vs. Central Michigan	2014
Most points scored (losing team)	48, Central Michigan vs. Western Kentucky	2014
Most points scored (both teams)	97, Western Kentucky vs. Central Michigan	2014
Fewest points allowed	6, Ohio vs. UAB	2017
Largest margin of victory	35, Ohio vs. UAB	2017
Total yards	647, Western Kentucky vs. Central Michigan	2014
Rushing yards	282, Western Michigan vs. Middle Tennessee	2015
Passing yards	493, Central Michigan vs. Western Kentucky	2014
First downs	29, Western Kentucky vs. Central Michigan	2014
Fewest yards allowed	242, Buffalo vs. Liberty	2025
Fewest rushing yards allowed	80, Buffalo vs. Charlotte	2019
Fewest passing yards allowed	77, Charlotte vs. Buffalo	2019
Individual	Record, Player, Team vs. Opponent	Year
All-purpose yards	215, Jamauri Bogan (Western Michigan)	2015
Touchdowns (all-purpose)	4, shared by Bogan, Brown, and Davis (see below)	
Rushing yards	215, Jamauri Bogan (Western Michigan)	2015
Rushing touchdowns	4, shared by: Jamauri Bogan (Western Michigan); Dorian Brown (Ohio)	2015; 2017
Passing yards	493, Cooper Rush (Central Michigan)	2014
Passing touchdowns	7, Cooper Rush (Central Michigan)	2014
Receiving yards	183, shared by: Corey Davis (Western Michigan); Trea Shropshire (UAB)	2015; 2022
Receptions	9, Yusuf Ali (Middle Tennessee)	2021
Receiving touchdowns	4, Titus Davis (Central Michigan)	2014
Tackles	15, Matthew Salopek (Miami (OH)); 10 (solo), Matthew Salopek (Miami (OH))	2022
Sacks	2, shared by: Derik Overstreet (Western Kentucky); Malcolm Koonce, (Buffalo); Nate Givhan (Toledo)	2014; 2019; 2021
Interceptions	1, by multiple players	
Long Plays	Record, Player, Team vs. Opponent	Year
Touchdown run	74 yds., Dorian Brown (Ohio)	2017
Touchdown pass	90 yds., Dequan Finn to Matt Landers (Toledo)	2021
Kickoff return	45 yds., Andre Wilson (UAB)	2017
Punt return	34 yds., Kylan Nelson (Ohio)	2017
Interception return	49 yds., Samuel Womack (Toledo)	2021
Fumble return	27 yds., Tony Annese (Central Michigan)	2014
Punt	68 yds., Ethan Duane (Buffalo)	2025
Field goal	52 yds., Upton Bellenfant (Buffalo)	2025

== Media coverage ==
The bowl has been televised by ESPN since its inception.

== See also ==
- List of college football games played outside the United States
