= 2024 UMass Minutemen football team =

American college football season

2024 UMass Minutemen football
- Conference: Independent
- Record: 2–10
- Head coach: Don Brown (8th season; first 10 games); Shane Montgomery (interim; remainder of season)
- Offensive coordinator: Shane Montgomery (1st season)
- Offensive scheme: Pro spread
- Defensive coordinator: Keith Dudzinski (10th season)
- Base defense: 4–3 or 4–2–5
- Home stadium: Warren McGuirk Alumni Stadium

2024 NCAA Division I FBS independents football records
	Conf.			Overall
Team	W		L	W		L
No. 2 Notre Dame ^		–		14	–	2
UConn		–		9	–	4
UMass		–		2	–	10
^ – College Football Playoff participant; Rankings from AP Poll

The 2024 UMass Minutemen football team represented the University of Massachusetts Amherst during the 2024 NCAA Division I FBS football season. They played their home games at Warren McGuirk Alumni Stadium located in Hadley, Massachusetts and competed as an FBS independent. They were led by head coach Don Brown in his third season since he was rehired, his eighth overall as head coach. He was fired on November 18, with offensive coordinator Shane Montgomery serving as interim head coach for the final two games.

This season marked the Minutemen's last season competing as an independent, as UMass rejoined the Mid-American Conference (MAC) as a full member beginning in 2025.

== Schedule ==
Date	Time	Opponent	Site	TV	Result	Attendance
August 31	3:30 p.m.	Eastern Michigan	McGuirk Alumni Stadium; Hadley, MA	ESPN+	L 14–28	12,810
September 7	3:30 p.m.	at Toledo	Glass Bowl; Toledo, OH	ESPN+	L 23–38	21,668
September 14	3:30 p.m.	at Buffalo	University at Buffalo Stadium; Amherst, NY (rivalry)	CBSSN	L 3–34	15,204
September 21	3:30 p.m.	Central Connecticut	McGuirk Alumni Stadium; Hadley, MA	ESPN+	W 35–31	10,847
September 28	3:30 p.m.	at Miami (OH)	Yager Stadium; Oxford, OH	ESPN+	L 20–23 ^{OT}	9,542
October 5	12:00 p.m.	at Northern Illinois	Huskie Stadium; DeKalb, IL	CBSSN	L 20–34	12,466
October 12	12:00 p.m.	No. 21 Missouri	McGuirk Alumni Stadium; Hadley, MA	ESPN2	L 3–45	16,102
October 26	3:30 p.m.	Wagner	McGuirk Alumni Stadium; Hadley, MA	ESPN+	W 35–7	14,374
November 2	4:15 p.m.	at Mississippi State	Davis Wade Stadium; Starkville, MS	SECN	L 20–45	48,617
November 16	12:00 p.m.	Liberty	McGuirk Alumni Stadium; Hadley, MA	ESPN+	L 34–35 ^{OT}	9,115
November 23	12:45 p.m.	at No. 10 Georgia	Sanford Stadium; Athens, GA	SECN	L 21–59	93,033
November 30	12:00 p.m.	UConn	McGuirk Alumni Stadium; Hadley, MA (rivalry)	ESPN+	L 42–47	10,365
Rankings from AP Poll and CFP Rankings released prior to game; All times are in Eastern time

== Game summaries ==
=== Eastern Michigan ===
Eastern Michigan Eagles at UMass Minutemen – Game summary

Quarter	1	2	3	4	Total
Eagles	0	14	3	11	28
Minutemen	0	0	7	7	14

at Warren McGuirk Alumni Stadium, Hadley, Massachusetts

- Date: August 31
- Game time: 3:30 p.m. EDT
- Game weather: Cloudy, 79 °F (26 °C)
- Game attendance: 12,810
- Referee: Rory Bernard
- TV announcers (ESPN+): Jay Burnham (play-by-play) and Andy Gresh (analyst)
- Box score, Recap

Game information
First quarter
- No scoring plays

Second quarter

- EMU – Cole Snyder 1-yard run (Jesus Gomez kick), 12:47. Eagles 7–0. Drive: 10 plays, 97 yards, 3:53.
- EMU – Oran Singleton 18-yard pass from Cole Snyder (Jesus Gomez kick), 0:31. Eagles 14–0. Drive: 6 plays, 57 yards, 0:31.

Third quarter

- MASS – Jalen John 1-yard run (Jacob Lurie kick), 8:43. Eagles 14–7. Drive: 10 plays, 70 yards, 5:24.
- EMU – Jesus Gomez 20-yard field goal, 4:49. Eagles 17–7. Drive: 10 plays, 73 yards, 3:54.

Fourth quarter

- EMU – Jesus Gomez 31-yard field goal, 7:49. Eagles 20–7. Drive: 13 plays, 59 yards, 7:01.
- EMU – Delbert Mimms III 6-yard (Cole Snyder pass to Markus Allen), 5:43. Eagles 28–7. Drive: 2 plays, 33 yards, 0:29.
- MASS – C. J. Hester 2-yard run (Jacob Lurie kick), 3:06. Eagles 28–14. Drive: 8 plays, 75 yards, 2:37.

Statistics	EMU	MASS
First downs	21	24
Total yards	375	329
Rushing yards	134	152
Passing yards	241	177
Turnovers	0	0
Time of possession	26:37	33:23

Team	Category	Player	Statistics
Eastern Michigan	Passing	Cole Snyder	17/28, 241 yards, TD
Eastern Michigan	Rushing	Delbert Mimms III	12 rushes, 60 yards, TD
Eastern Michigan	Receiving	Oran Singleton	8 receptions, 89 yards, TD
UMass	Passing	Taisun Phommachanh	20/30, 177 yards
UMass	Rushing	Taisun Phommachanh	16 rushes, 57 yards
UMass	Receiving	Jalen John	5 receptions, 42 yards

=== at Toledo ===
UMass Minutemen at Toledo Rockets – Game summary

Quarter	1	2	3	4	Total
Minutemen	0	13	3	7	23
Rockets	7	10	7	14	38

at Glass Bowl, Toledo, Ohio

- Date: September 7
- Game time: 3:30 p.m. EDT
- Game weather: Cloudy, 61 °F (16 °C)
- Game attendance: 21,668
- Referee: Greg Sujack
- TV announcers (ESPN+): Michael Reghi and Je'Rod Cherry
- Box score, Recap

Game information
First quarter
- TOL – Jerjuan Newton 40-yard pass from Tucker Gleason (Dylan Cunanan kick), 3:19. Rockets 7–0. Drive: 4 plays, 67 yards, 1:38.

Second quarter

- MASS – Jacob Lurie 23-yard field goal, 11:52. Rockets 7–3. Drive: 10 plays, 86 yards, 6:22.
- TOL – Dylan Cunanan 26-yard field goal, 9:09. Rockets 10–3. Drive: 8 plays, 67 yards, 2:43.
- MASS – Jakobie Keeney-James 14-yard pass from Taisun Phommachanh (Jacob Lurie kick), 2:42. Tied 10–10. Drive: 11 plays, 75 yards, 6:27.
- TOL – Jacquez Stuart 98-yard kickoff return (Dylan Cunanan kick), 2:32. Rockets 17–10.
- MASS – Jacob Lurie 42-yard field goal, 0:01. Rockets 17–13. Drive: 10 plays, 41 yards, 2:32.

Third quarter

- MASS – Jacob Lurie 30-yard field goal, 6:44. Rockets 17–16. Drive: 17 plays, 59 yards, 7:17.
- TOL – Junior Vandeross III 73-yard pass from Tucker Gleason (Dylan Cunanan kick), 4:08. Rockets 24–16.

Fourth quarter

- TOL – Willie Shaw III 4-yard run (Dylan Cunanan kick), 12:30. Rockets 31–16. Drive: 4 plays, 55 yards, 1:47.
- MASS – Taisun Phommachanh 8-yard run (Jacob Lurie kick), 2:56. Rockets 31–23. Drive: 10 plays, 73 yards, 5:01.
- TOL – Anthony Torres 7-yard pass from Tucker Gleason (Dylan Cunanan kick), 2:26. Rockets 38–23. Drive: 4 plays, 25 yards, 0:29.

Statistics	MASS	TOL
First downs	23	12
Total yards	384	258
Rushing yards	125	83
Passing yards	259	175
Turnovers	1	0
Time of possession	44:21	15:39

Team	Category	Player	Statistics
UMass	Passing	Taisun Phommachanh	26/40, 259 yards, TD, INT
UMass	Rushing	Taisun Phommachanh	22 rushes, 44 yards, TD
UMass	Receiving	Jakobie Keeney-James	6 receptions, 93 yards, TD
Toledo	Passing	Tucker Gleason	8/23, 175 yards, 3 TD
Toledo	Rushing	Tucker Gleason	3 rushes, 34 yards
Toledo	Receiving	Junior Vandeross III	3 receptions, 115 yards, TD

=== at Buffalo ===
UMass Minutemen at Buffalo Bulls – Game summary

Quarter	1	2	3	4	Total
Minutemen	0	3	0	0	3
Bulls	7	3	17	7	34

at UB Stadium, Amherst, New York

- Date: September 14
- Game time: 1:00 p.m. EDT
- Game weather: Sunny, 82 °F (28 °C)
- Game attendance: 15,204
- Referee: Andrew Speciale
- TV announcers (CBSSN): Jordan Kent and Logan Ryan
- Box score, Recap

Game information

First quarter

- UB – J. J. Jenkins 40-yard pass from C. J. Ogbonna (Upton Bellenfant kick), 10:06. Bulls 7–0. Drive: 6 plays, 85 yards, 2:01.

Second quarter

- UB – Upton Bellenfant 37-yard field goal, 11:52. Bulls 10–0. Drive: 6 plays, 18 yards, 2:14.
- MASS – Jacob Lurie 34-yard field goal, 1:50. Bulls 10–3. Drive: 13 plays, 39 yards, 6:20.

Third quarter

- UB – Upton Bellenfant 34-yard field goal, 11:24 Bulls 13–3. Drive: 10 plays, 55 yards, 3:22.
- UB – C. J. Ogbonna 8-yard run (Upton Bellenfant kick), 4:38. Bulls 20–3. Drive: 2 plays, 20 yards, 0:35.
- UB – Marquis Cooper 100-yard interception return (Upton Bellenfant kick), 0:00. Bulls 27–3.

Fourth quarter

- UB – Lamar Sperling 1-yard run (Upton Bellenfant kick), 4:54. Bulls 34–3. Drive: 13 plays, 75 yards, 8:07.

Statistics	MASS	UB
First downs	11	15
Total yards	193	314
Rushing yards	72	129
Passing yards	121	185
Turnovers	1	1
Time of possession	32:04	27:56

Team	Category	Player	Statistics
UMass	Passing	Taisun Phommachanh	14/29, 121 yards, INT
UMass	Rushing	Brandon Campbell	8 rushes, 36 yards
UMass	Receiving	Jacquon Gibson	4 receptions, 58 yards
Buffalo	Passing	C. J. Ogbonna	14/22, 185 yards, TD
Buffalo	Rushing	Lamar Sperling	16 rushes, 86 yards, TD
Buffalo	Receiving	J. J. Jenkins	2 receptions, 44 yards, TD

=== Central Connecticut (FCS) ===
Central Connecticut Blue Devils (FCS) at UMass Minutemen – Game summary

Quarter	1	2	3	4	Total
Blue Devils (FCS)	0	21	7	3	31
Minutemen	7	14	7	7	35

at Warren McGuirk Alumni Stadium, Hadley, Massachusetts

- Date: September 21
- Game time: 3:30 p.m. EDT
- Game weather: Cloudy, 67 °F (19 °C)
- Game attendance: 10,847
- Referee: Jerry Magallanes
- TV announcers (ESPN+): Jay Burnham (play-by-play) and Andy Gresh (analyst)
- Box score, Recap

Game information
First quarter
- MASS – Jackson Paradis 1-yard run (Jacob Lurie kick), 8:31. Minutemen 7–0. Drive: 10 plays, 56 yards, 5:15.

Second quarter

- MASS – Jakobie Kenney-James 15-yard pass from Taisun Phommachanh (Jacob Lurie kick), 9:10. Minutemen 14–0. Drive: 7 plays, 82 yards, 3:41.
- CCSU – Ricky Ortega 3-yard run (Jack Barnum kick), 6:15. Minutemen 14–7. Drive: 5 plays, 75 yards, 2:55.
- CCSU – Elijah Howard 1-yard run (Jack Barnum kick), 4:08. Tied 14–14. Drive: 2 plays, 2 yards, 0:48.
- MASS – Owen Anderson 2-yard pass from Taisun Phommachanh (Jacob Lurie kick), 0:39. Minutemen 21–14. Drive: 11 plays, 84 yards, 3:22.
- CCSU – Elijah Howard 2-yard pass from Brady Olson (Jack Barnum kick), 0:07. Tied 21–21. Drive: 4 plays, 27 yards, 0:25.

Third quarter

- CCSU – Paul Marsh Jr. 10-yard pass from Brady Olson (Jack Barnum kick), 10:12. Blue Devils 28–21. Drive: 8 plays, 52 yards, 4:48.
- MASS – T. Y. Harding 57-yard pass from Taisun Phommachanh (Jacob Lurie kick), 1:38. Tied 28–28. Drive: 6 plays, 85 yards, 2:39.

Fourth quarter

- CCSU – Jack Barnum 25-yard field goal, 14:11. Blue Devils 31–28. Drive: 5 plays, 61 yards, 2:13.
- MASS – Brandon Campbell 3-yard run (Jacob Lurie kick), 9:18. Minutemen 35–31. Drive: 10 plays, 75 yards, 4:53.

Statistics	CCSU	MASS
First downs	11	27
Total yards	247	450
Rushing yards	90	163
Passing yards	157	287
Turnovers	1	1
Time of possession	22:14	37:46

Team	Category	Player	Statistics
Central Connecticut	Passing	Brady Olson	12/26, 157 yards, 2 TD, INT
Central Connecticut	Rushing	Elijah Howard	14 rushes, 46 yards, TD
Central Connecticut	Receiving	Michael Plaskon	3 receptions, 65 yards
UMass	Passing	Taisun Phommachanh	20/30, 287 yards, 3 TD, INT
UMass	Rushing	Jalen John	13 rushes, 65 yards
UMass	Receiving	Jakobie Kenney-James	5 receptions, 95 yards, TD

=== at Miami (OH) ===
UMass Minutemen at Miami RedHawks – Game summary

Quarter	1	2	3	4	OT	Total
Minutemen	7	3	0	10	0	20
RedHawks	7	3	7	3	3	23

at Yager Stadium, Oxford, Ohio

- Date: September 28
- Game time: 3:30 p.m. EDT
- Game attendance: 9,542
- TV announcers (ESPN+): Doug Sherman (play-by-play) and Forrest Conoly (analyst)

Statistics	MASS	M-OH
First downs	15	19
Total yards	344	349
Rushing yards	171	168
Passing yards	173	181
Turnovers	0	1
Time of possession	30:51	29:09

Team	Category	Player	Statistics
UMass	Passing	Taisun Phommachanh	9-22 173 Yards 1 TD
UMass	Rushing	Taisun Phommachanh	18 carries 80 Yards
UMass	Receiving	Jakobie Keeney-James	4 Receptions 150 Yards 1 TD
Miami (OH)	Passing	Brett Gabbert	16-25 181 Yards 1 TD 1 INT
Miami (OH)	Rushing	Keyon Mozee	9 carries 114 Yards 1 TD
Miami (OH)	Receiving	Javon Tracy	5 Receptions 49 Yards 1 TD

=== at Northern Illinois ===
UMass Minutemen at Northern Illinois Huskies – Game summary

Quarter	1	2	3	4	Total
Minutemen	7	6	0	7	20
Huskies	7	0	6	21	34

at Huskie Stadium, DeKalb, Illinois

- Date: October 5
- Game time: 12:00 p.m. EDT/11:00 a.m. CDT
- Game weather: Sunny • Temperature: 68 °F (20 °C) • Wind: NW at 12 miles per hour (19 km/h)
- Game attendance: 12,466
- Referee: Matt Packowski
- TV announcers (CBSSN): Carter Blackburn (play-by-play) and Luke Kuechly (analyst)

Game information
First quarter
- NIU – Brock Lampe 15-yard pass from Ethan Hampton (Kanon Woodill kick), 14:10. Huskies 7–0. Drive: 1 play, 15 yards, 0:06.
- MASS – T.Y. Harding 58-yard pass from Taisun Phommachanh (Jacob Lurie kick), 11:56. Tied 7–7. Drive: 4 plays, 75 yards, 2:14.

Second quarter

- MASS – Jacob Lurie 27-yard field goal, 12:33. Minutemen 10–7. Drive: 12 plays, 71 yards, 5:37.
- MASS – Jacob Lurie 27-yard field goal, 0:06. Minutemen 13–7. Drive: 10 plays, 46 yards, 3:19.

Third quarter

- NIU – Jaylen Poe 22-yard run (PAT missed), 11:23. Tied 13–13. Drive: 7 plays, 75 yards, 3:37.

Fourth quarter

- NIU – Jaylen Poe 3-yard run (Kanon Woodill kick), 14:12. Huskies 20–13. Drive: 13 plays, 75 yards, 7:06.
- NIU – Gavin Williams 1-yard run (Kanon Woodill kick), 5:29. Huskies 27–13. Drive: 9 plays, 90 yards, 5:22.
- MASS – T.Y. Harding 16-yard pass from Taisun Phommachanh (Jacob Lurie kick), 3:16. Huskies 27–20. Drive: 8 plays, 75 yards, 2:13.
- NIU – Ethan Hampton 1-yard run (Kanon Woodill kick), 2:05. Huskies 34–20. Drive: 3 plays, 4 yards, 0:57.

Statistics	MASS	NIU
First downs	19	23
Total yards	378	402
Rushing yards	115	367
Passing yards	263	35
Turnovers	1	2
Time of possession	26:20	33:40

Team	Category	Player	Statistics
UMass	Passing	Taisun Phommachanh	15/30, 263 yards, 2 TD
UMass	Rushing	CJ Hester	15 carries, 71 yards
UMass	Receiving	T.Y. Harding	5 receptions, 116 yards, 2 TD
Northern Illinois	Passing	Ethan Hampton	5/9, 34 yards, TD, INT
Northern Illinois	Rushing	Gavin Wiliams	19 carries, 125 yards, TD
Northern Illinois	Receiving	Brock Lampe	1 reception, 15 yards, TD

=== No. 21 Missouri ===
No. 21 Missouri Tigers at UMass Minutemen – Game summary

Quarter	1	2	3	4	Total
No. 21 Tigers	14	10	21	0	45
Minutemen	0	3	0	0	3

at Warren McGuirk Alumni Stadium, Hadley, Massachusetts

- Date: October 12
- Game time: 12:00 p.m.
- Game weather: Sunny • Temperature: 64 °F (18 °C) • Wind: NW at 14 miles per hour (23 km/h)
- Game attendance: 16,102
- Referee: Gary Patterson
- TV announcers (ESPN2): Roy Philpott (play-by-play), Sam Acho (analyst), and Taylor Davis (sideline reporter)

Game information

First quarter

- (14:03) MIZ – Luther Burden 61-yard run, Blake Craig kick (Drive: 2 plays, 63 yards, 0:51; Missouri 7–0)
- (5:15) MIZ - Marcus Carroll 3-yard run, Blake Craig kick (Drive: 13 plays, 80 yards, 7:10; Missouri 14–0)

Second quarter

- (11:02) MIZ - Marcus Carroll 4-yard run, Blake Craig kick (Drive: 9 plays, 80 yards, 4:37; Missouri 21–0)
- (6:00) UMA - Jacob Lurie 28-yard field goal (Drive: 10 plays, 65 yards, 5:02; Missouri 21–3)
- (0:00) MIZ - Blake Craig 42-yard field goal (Drive: 2 plays, -10 yards, 0:08; Missouri 24–3)

Third quarter

- (10:09) MIZ - Marcus Carroll 35-yard run, Blake Craig kick (Drive: 6 plays, 57 yards, 2:28; Missouri 31–3)
- (8:30) MIZ - Joshua Manning 63-yard pass from Brady Cook, Blake Craig kick (Drive: 1 play, 63 yards, 0:12; Missouri 38–3)
- (1:24) MIZ - Brett Norfleet 8-yard pass from Brady Cook, Blake Craig kick (Drive: 3 plays, 48 yards, 1:41; Missouri 45–3)

Fourth quarter

No scoring plays

Statistics	MIZ	MASS
First downs	22	13
Total yards	461	237
Rushing yards	231	95
Passing yards	230	142
Turnovers	0	2
Time of possession	31:41	28:19

Team	Category	Player	Statistics
Missouri	Passing	Brady Cook	14/19, 219 yards, 2 TD
Missouri	Rushing	Marcus Carroll	15 carries, 91 yards, 3 TD
Missouri	Receiving	Joshua Manning	2 receptions, 68 yards, TD
UMass	Passing	Taisun Phommachanh	12/22, 132 yards, INT
UMass	Rushing	Te'Rai Powell	1 carry, 39 yards
UMass	Receiving	Jakobie Keeney-James	6 receptions, 80 yards

=== Wagner (FCS) ===
Wagner Seahawks (FCS) at UMass Minutemen – Game summary

Quarter	1	2	3	4	Total
Seahawks (FCS)	0	0	0	0	0
Minutemen	0	0	0	0	0

at Warren McGuirk Alumni Stadium, Hadley, Massachusetts

- Date: October 26
- Game time: 3:30 p.m. EDT
- TV announcers (ESPN+): Jay Burnham (play-by-play) and Andy Gresh (analyst)

Statistics	WAG	MASS
First downs		
Total yards		
Rushing yards		
Passing yards		
Turnovers		
Time of possession		

Team	Category	Player	Statistics
Wagner	Passing		
Wagner	Rushing		
Wagner	Receiving		
UMass	Passing		
UMass	Rushing		
UMass	Receiving		

=== at Mississippi State ===
UMass Minutemen at Mississippi State Bulldogs – Game summary

Quarter	1	2	3	4	Total
Minutemen	10	0	0	10	20
Bulldogs	0	21	14	10	45

at Davis Wade Stadium, Oxford, Mississippi

- Date: November 2
- Game time: 4:15 p.m. EDT/3:15 p.m. CDT
- Game weather: Sunny, 77 °F (25 °C)
- Game attendance: 48,617
- Referee: David Smith
- TV announcers (SECN): Dave Neal (play-by-play), Aaron Murray (analyst) and Ashley ShahAhmadi (sideline)

Game information
First quarter
- MASS – Brandon Campbell 3-yard run (Jacob Lurie kick), 7:23. Minutemen 7–0. Drive: 13 plays, 76 yards, 6:32.
- MASS – Jacob Lurie 24-yard field goal, 1:13. Minutemen 10–0. Drive: 8 plays, 37 yards, 4:14.

Second quarter

- MSST – Michael Van Buren Jr. 4-yard run (Kyle Ferrie kick), 14:27. Minutemen 10–7. Drive: 7 plays, 58 yards, 1:38.
- MSST – Seydou Traore 19-yard pass from Michael Van Buren Jr. (Kyle Ferrie kick), 9:05. Bulldogs 14–10. Drive: 6 plays, 97 yards, 2:11.
- MSST – Michael Van Buren Jr. 2-yard run (Kyle Ferrie kick), 1:56. Bulldogs 21–10. Drive: 11 plays, 80 yards, 4:19.

Third quarter

- MSST – Johnnie Daniels 36-yard run (Kyle Ferrie kick), 11:11. Bulldogs 28–10. Drive: 5 plays, 68 yards, 1:47.
- MSST – Davon Booth 30-yard run (Kyle Ferrie kick), 3:25. Bulldogs 35–10. Drive: 6 plays, 80 yards, 1:58.

Fourth quarter

- MASS – Jacob Lurie 35-yard field goal, 12:05. Bulldogs 35–13. Drive: 12 plays, 58 yards, 6:20.
- MSST – Kyle Ferrie 24-yard field goal, 10:17. Bulldogs 38–13. Drive: 7 plays, 69 yards, 1:48.
- MSST – Xavier Gayten 72-yard run (Kyle Ferrie kick), 6:51. Bulldogs 45–13. Drive: 2 plays, 78 yards, 0:35.
- MASS – Jakobie Kenney-James 4-yard pass from A. J. Hairston (Jacob Lurie kick), 0:17. Bulldogs 45–20. Drive: 13 plays, 75 yards, 6:34.

Statistics	MASS	MSST
First downs	25	26
Total yards	335	463
Rushing yards	199	241
Passing yards	136	222
Turnovers	1	0
Time of possession	40:49	19:11

Team	Category	Player	Statistics
UMass	Passing	A. J. Hairston	7/11, 62 yards, TD
UMass	Rushing	Brandon Campbell	10 carries, 64 yards, TD
UMass	Receiving	Jakobie Keeney-James	4 receptions, 29 yards, TD
Mississippi State	Passing	Michael Van Buren Jr.	14/25, 222 yards, TD
Mississippi State	Rushing	Johnnie Daniels	6 carries, 92 yards, TD
Mississippi State	Receiving	Jordan Mosley	4 receptions, 107 yards

=== Liberty ===
Liberty Flames at UMass Minutemen – Game summary

Quarter	1	2	3	4	OT	Total
Flames	0	7	7	14	7	35
Minutemen	7	13	0	8	6	34

at Warren McGuirk Alumni Stadium, Hadley, Massachusetts

- Date: November 16
- Game time: 12:00 p.m. EDT/11:00 a.m. CDT
- Game weather: Sunny • Temperature: 56 °F (13 °C) • Wind: NW 11 miles per hour (18 km/h)
- Game attendance: 9,115
- Referee: Gary Patterson
- TV announcers (ESPN+): Jay Burnham (play-by-play) and Andy Gresh (analyst)

Game information

First quarter

- (9:20) UMASS – Jalen John 9-yard run, Jacob Lurie kick (Drive: 10 plays, 77 yards, 5:35; UMass 7–0)
- (7:20) UMASS – Jacob Lurie 22-yard field goal (Drive: 13 plays, 86 yards, 6:50; UMass 10–0)

Second quarter

- (5:01) LIB – Quinton Cooley 11-yard run, Colin Karhu kick (Drive: 6 plays, 82 yards, 2:11; UMass 10–7)
- (1:33) UMASS – Jacob Lurie 43-yard field goal (Drive: 9 plays, 51 yards, 3:28; UMass 13–7)
- (0:10) UMASS – AJ Hairston 2-yard run, Jacob Lurie kick (Drive: 6 plays, 45 yards, 0:58; UMass 20–7)

Third quarter

- (10:01) LIB – Kaidon Salter 8-yard run, Colin Karhu kick (Drive: 11 plays, 82 yards, 4:51; UMass 20–14)

Fourth quarter

- (13:09) LIB – Quinton Cooley 11-yard run, Colin Karhu kick (Drive: 12 plays, 89 yards, 5:40; Liberty 21–20)
- (7:08) UMASS – Ahmad Haston 2-yard run, Dominick Mazotti pass (Drive: 11 plays, 75 yards, 6:01; UMass 28–21)
- (3:49) LIB – Kaidon Salter 1-yard run, Colin Karhu kick (Drive: 8 plays, 65 yards, 3:19; Tied 28–28)

Overtime

- (0:00) UMASS – Jalen John 2-yard run (Drive: 2 plays, 25 yards, 0:00; UMass 34–28)
- (0:00) LIB – Quinton Cooley 11-yard run, Colin Karhu kick (Drive: 3 plays, 25 yards, 0:00; Liberty 35–34)

Statistics	LIB	MASS
First downs	27	26
Total yards	423	426
Rushing yards	309	263
Passing yards	114	163
Turnovers	2	0
Time of possession	27:50	32:10

Team	Category	Player	Statistics
Liberty	Passing	Kaidon Salter	9/16, 114 yards, INT
Liberty	Rushing	Quinton Cooley	20 carries, 147 yards, 3 TD
Liberty	Receiving	Treon Sibley	1 reception, 34 yards
UMass	Passing	AJ Hairston	13/25, 163 yards
UMass	Rushing	Jalen John	15 carries, 119 yards, 2 TD
UMass	Receiving	Jakobie Keeney-James	6 receptions, 75 yards

=== at No. 10 Georgia ===
UMass Minutemen at No. 10 Georgia Bulldogs – Game summary

Quarter	1	2	3	4	Total
Minutemen	7	7	7	0	21
No. 10 Bulldogs	7	21	17	14	59

at Sanford Stadium, Athens, Georgia

- Date: November 23
- Game time: 12:45 p.m. EDT
- Game weather: Sunny • Temperature: 57 °F (14 °C)
- Game attendance: 93,033
- Referee: Lee Hedrick
- TV announcers (SECN): Dave Neal (play-by-play), Max Starks (analyst), and Ashley ShahAhmadi (sideline)

Statistics	MASS	UGA
First downs	14	34
Total yards	351	550
Rushing yards	226	208
Passing yards	125	342
Turnovers	2	0
Time of possession	30:04	29:56

Team	Category	Player	Statistics
UMass	Passing	AJ Hairston	7/16, 121 yards, TD
UMass	Rushing	John Jalen	9 carries, 107 yards, TD
UMass	Receiving	Jakobie Keeney-James	3 receptions, 101 yards, TD
Georgia	Passing	Carson Beck	20/31, 297 yards, 4 TD
Georgia	Rushing	Nate Frazier	21 carries, 136 yards, 3 TD
Georgia	Receiving	Arian Smith	3 receptions, 110 yards, TD

=== UConn (rivalry) ===
UConn Huskies at UMass Minutemen – Game summary

Quarter	1	2	3	4	Total
Huskies	14	13	6	14	47
Minutemen	14	14	0	14	42

at Warren McGuirk Alumni Stadium, Hadley, Massachusetts

- Date: November 30
- Game time: 11:00 AM
- Game weather: Temperature: 37 °F (3 °C) • Wind: W at 8 miles per hour (13 km/h) • Weather: Sunny
- Game attendance: 10,365
- Referee: Nate Black
- TV announcers (ESPN+): Jay Burnham (play-by-play) and Andy Gresh (analyst)

Game information
First quarter
- CONN - Hansen, Louis 55 yd pass from Fagnano, Joe (Freeman, Chris kick), 13:57. Huskies 7–0. Drive: 1 plays, 55 yards, TOP 00:10
- MASS - Gibson, Jacquon 19 yd pass from Hairston, AJ (Lurie, Jacob kick), 8:16. Tied 7–7. Drive: 9 plays, 78 yards, TOP 05:34
- MASS - Keeney-James, Jakobie 29 yd pass from Hairston, AJ (Lurie, Jacob kick), 2:17. Minutemen 14–7. Drive: 8 plays, 60 yards, TOP 04:39
- CONN - Brown, Mel 96 yd kickoff return (Freeman, Chris kick), 2:02. Tied 14–14. Drive: 1 play, 96 yards

Second quarter

- CONN - Edwards, Cam 3 yd run (Freeman, Chris kick), 11:58. Huskies 21–14. Drive: 10 plays, 80 yards, TOP 03:14
- MASS - Mazotti, Dominick 1 yd pass from Hairston, AJ (Lurie, Jacob kick), 8:26. Tied 21–21. Drive: 4 plays, 35 yards, TOP 01:55
- CONN - Freeman, Chris 30 yd field goal, 4:46. Huskies 24–21. Drive: 8 plays, 63 yards, TOP 03:34
- MASS - John, Jalen 15 yd run (Moore, Riley kick), 1:19. Minutemen 28–24. Drive: 8 plays, 75 yards, TOP 03:27
- CONN - Freeman, Chris 53 yd field goal, 0:17. Minutemen 28–27. Drive: 7 plays, 17 yards, TOP 00:55

Third quarter

- CONN - Gathings, Jasaiah 26 yd pass from Fagnano, Joe (2PC no good), 0:12. Huskies 33–28. Drive: 4 plays, 49 yards, TOP 01:29

Fourth quarter

- CONN - Edwards, Cam 3 yd pass from Fagnano, Joe (Freeman, Chris kick), 11:12. Huskies 40–28. Drive: 7 plays, 35 yards, TOP 03:35
- MASS - Hester, CJ 8 yd run (Lurie, Jacob kick), 7:20. Huskies 40–35. Drive: 7 plays, 75 yards, TOP 03:52
- CONN - Robinson, Durell 15 yd run (Freeman, Chris kick), 2:18. Huskies 47–35. Drive: 9 plays, 78 yards, TOP 04:57
- MASS - Harding, T.Y. 7 yd pass from Perry, Will (Moore, Riley kick), 0:36. Huskies 47–42. Drive: 13 plays, 75 yards, TOP 01:42

Statistics	CONN	MASS
First downs	22	22
Total yards	434	390
Rushing yards	253	184
Passing yards	181	206
Turnovers	1	0
Time of possession	29:05	30:55

Team	Category	Player	Statistics
UConn	Passing	Joe Fagnano	15/26, 181 yards, 3 TDs, INT
UConn	Rushing	Cam Edwards	18 carries, 142 yards, 1 TD
UConn	Receiving	Louis Hansen	4 reception, 73 yards, 1 TD
UMass	Passing	AJ Hairston	13/21, 134 yards, 3 TDs
UMass	Rushing	Jalen John	18 carries, 78 yards, 1 TD
UMass	Receiving	Jakobie Keeney-James	5 reception, 68 yards, 1 TD
