= 2025 Bahamas Bowl =

Postseason college football bowl game

- 10th Bahamas Bowl
Buffalo Bulls	Liberty Flames
(8–4)	(8–3)
MAC	CUSA
26	7
Head coach: Pete Lembo	Head coach: Jamey Chadwell
	1	2	3	4	Total
Buffalo	6	3	7	10	26
Liberty	0	0	0	7	7
- Date: January 4, 2025
- Season: 2024
- Stadium: Thomas Robinson Stadium
- Location: Nassau, Bahamas
- MVP: Offense: Al-Jay Henderson (RB, Buffalo); Defense: Red Murdock (LB, Buffalo)
- Favorite: Buffalo by 3.5
- Referee: Darryl DeBerry (AAC)
- Attendance: 4,610

United States TV coverage
- Network: ESPN2
- Announcers: Matt Schumacker (play-by-play), Dustin Fox (analyst) and Coley Harvey (sideline)

The 2025 Bahamas Bowl was a college football bowl game played on January 4, 2025, at Thomas Robinson Stadium located in Nassau, The Bahamas. The 10th annual Bahamas Bowl game featured Buffalo and Liberty. The game began at approximately 11:00 a.m. EST and aired on ESPN2. The Bahamas Bowl was one of the final 2024–25 bowl games concluding the 2024 FBS football season, and was the final team-competitive bowl game not part of the College Football Playoff (CFP). Buffalo defeated Liberty, 26–7, to claim their fourth consecutive bowl victory.

== Teams ==
Consistent with conference tie-ins, the game featured the Buffalo Bulls from Mid-American Conference (MAC) and Liberty Flames from the Conference USA (C-USA). The teams had previously met three times, between 1998 and 2023, with Liberty winning each of those games.

=== Buffalo Bulls ===
Buffalo compiled an 8–4 regular season record (6–2 in MAC play). After playing to a 4–4 record through eight games, the Bulls concluded their schedule with four consecutive wins. Buffalo faced two ranked FBS teams, losing to Missouri while defeating Northern Illinois.

=== Liberty Flames ===
Liberty posted an overall record of 8–3 in regular-season games (5–3 in C-USA play). The Flames had one game canceled, against Appalachian State, due to Hurricane Helene. Liberty began their season with five consecutive wins, then went 3–3 in their final six games. The Flames did not face any ranked opponents.

Liberty's starting quarterback, Kaidon Salter, and running back, Quinton Cooley, both opted out of the game. Salter had committed to play at Colorado in 2025 and Cooley chose to focus on preparing for the 2025 NFL draft.

== Game summary ==
2025 Bahamas Bowl

Quarter	1	2	3	4	Total
Buffalo	6	3	7	10	26
Liberty	0	0	0	7	7

at Thomas Robinson Stadium • Nassau, Bahamas

- Date: Saturday, January 4, 2025
- Game time: 11:02 a.m. EST
- Game weather: Sunny • Temperature: 73 °F (23 °C) • Wind: 14 mph (23 km/h) north
- Game attendance: 4,610
- Referee: Darryl DeBerry
- TV announcers (ESPN2): Matt Schumacker (play-by-play), Dustin Fox (analyst) and Coley Harvey (sideline)
- Box score

Game information

First Quarter

- (10:30) BUFF – Upton Bellenfant 52 yard field goal (Drive: 7 plays, 29 yards, 3:00; Buffalo 3–0)
- (5:37) BUFF – Upton Bellenfant 43 yard field goal (Drive: 7 plays, 42 yards, 3:24; Buffalo 6–0)

Second Quarter

- (14:56) BUFF – Upton Bellenfant 20 yard field goal (Drive: 8 plays, 55 yards, 1:46; Buffalo 9–0)

Third Quarter

- (12:01) BUFF – Al-Jay Henderson 45 yard run, Upton Bellenfant kick (Drive: 9 plays, 75 yards, 2:59; Buffalo 16–0)

Fourth Quarter

- (12:28) BUFF – Upton Bellenfant 45 yard field goal (Drive: 4 plays, 7 yards, 1:26; Buffalo 19–0)
- (12:09) BUFF – Red Murdock 31 yard interception return, Upton Bellenfant kick (Drive: 2 plays, 0 yards, 0:19; Buffalo 26–0)
- (7:00) LIB – Reese Smith 36 yard pass from Nate Hampton, Colin Karhu kick (Drive: 14 plays, 75 yards, 5:09; Buffalo 26–7)

=== Statistics ===
Statistics	BUF	LIB
First downs	18	11
Plays–yards	75–359	56–242
Rushes–yards	56–222	35–162
Passing yards	137	80
Passing: comp–att–int	9–19–0	6–21–1
Time of possession	37:01	22:59

Team	Category	Player	Statistics
Buffalo	Passing	C. J. Ogbonna	9/19, 137 yards
Buffalo	Rushing	Al-Jay Henderson	21 carries, 199 yards, TD
Buffalo	Receiving	Victor Snow	4 receptions, 41 yards
Liberty	Passing	Nate Hampton	2/9, 40 yards, TD, INT
Liberty	Rushing	Billy Lucas	3 carries, 57 yards
Liberty	Receiving	Reese Smith	1 reception, 36 yards, TD
