= Jake Hansen (American football) =

American football player (born 1998)

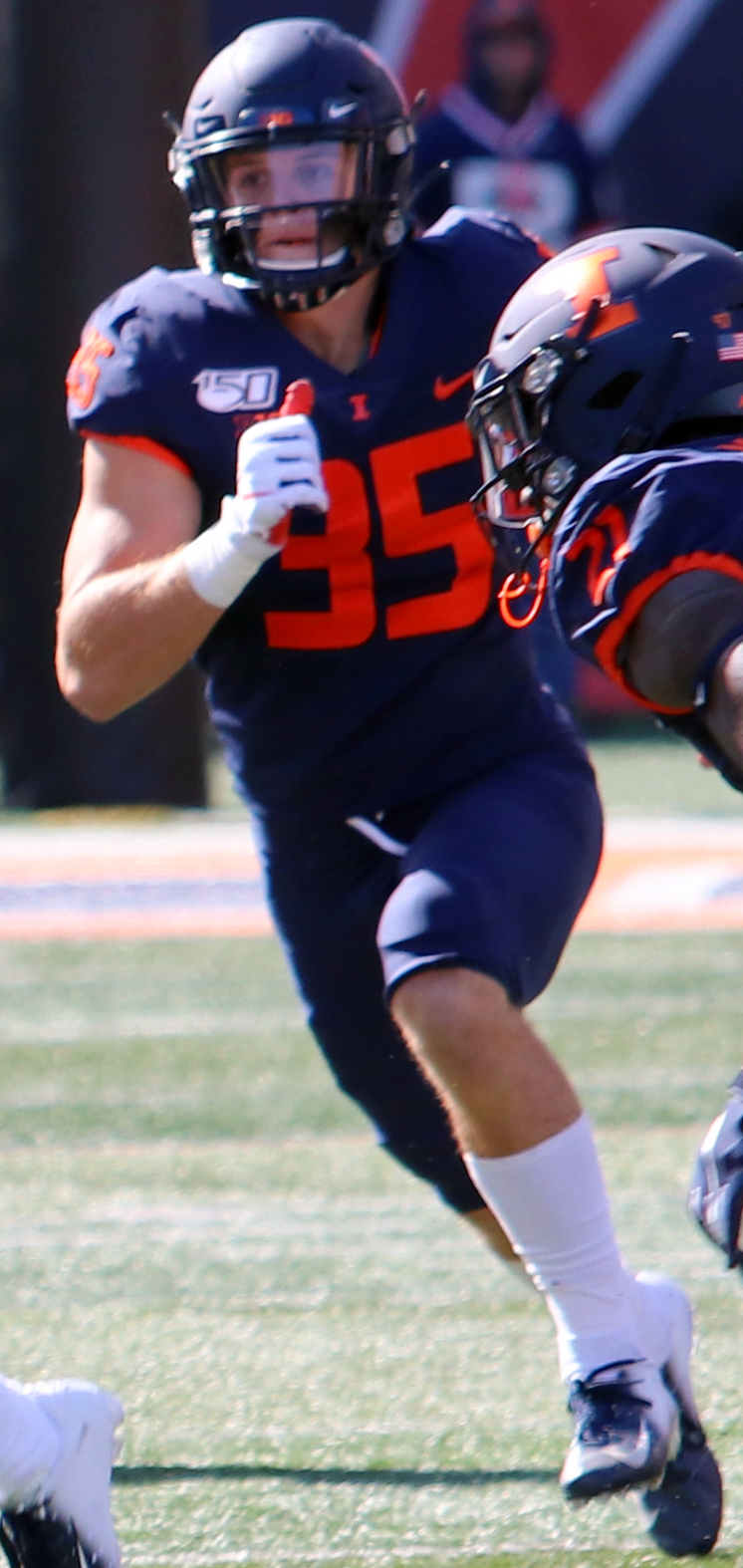
- Hansen with the Illinois Fighting Illini in 2019

No. 35 – Houston Texans
- Position: Linebacker
- Roster status: Active

Personal information
- Born: June 19, 1998 (age 28); Tarpon Springs, Florida, U.S.
- Listed height: 6 ft 1 in (1.85 m)
- Listed weight: 230 lb (104 kg)

Career information
- High school: East Lake (Tarpon Springs)
- College: Illinois (2016–2021)
- NFL draft: 2022: undrafted

Career history
- Houston Texans (2022–present)

Awards and highlights
- Second-team All-Big Ten (2020); NCAA records: Forced fumbles in a season: 7 (Note: Tied with Jacob Rodriguez of the 2025 Texas Tech Red Raiders, Red Murdock of the 2024 Buffalo Bulls, and Harold Landry of the 2016 Boston College Eagles.) (2019)

Career NFL statistics as of Week 1, 2026
- Total tackles: 86
- Sacks: 2.0
- Forced fumbles: 1
- Fumble recoveries: 1
- Stats at Pro Football Reference

Jake Hansen (born June 19, 1998) is an American professional football linebacker for the Houston Texans of the National Football League (NFL). He played college football for the Illinois Fighting Illini.

== College career ==
Hansen was a member of the Illinois Fighting Illini for six seasons. He decided to utilize the extra year of eligibility granted to college athletes who played in the 2020 season due to the coronavirus pandemic and return to Illinois for a sixth season. Hansen suffered a season-ending knee injury six games into the year. He finished his collegiate career with 276 tackles, 28.5 tackles for loss, and eight sacks and also forced 12 fumbles with seven fumble recoveries and intercepted three passes. Hansen was a three-time captain and led the nation in takeaways over two seasons (2019-2020). In college, Hansen came second in school history for forced fumbles with 12.

== Professional career ==
Pre-draft measurables
Height	Weight	Arm length	Hand span	Wingspan	Bench press
6 ft 0 7/8 in (1.85 m)	238 lb (108 kg)	32 3/8 in (0.82 m)	9 3/4 in (0.25 m)	6 ft 5 5/8 in (1.97 m)	21 reps
All values from NFL Combine

Hansen signed with the Houston Texans as an undrafted free agent on May 13, 2022. He made the Texans' initial 53-man roster out of training camp. As a rookie, he appeared in 11 games and started two in the 2022 season. He finished with one sack, 25 total tackles (15 solo), one forced fumble, and one fumble recovery.

On March 10, 2025, Hansen re-signed with the Texans on a one-year contract worth $2 million. On November 3, Hansen and the Texans agreed to a one-year, $3 million contract extension.

== Personal life ==
Hansen married his college sweetheart, Margeaux Adam, in a Chicago ceremony in June of 2025.
