= Red Murdock =

American football player (born 2003)

- Murdock with the Denver Broncos in 2026

No. 50 – Denver Broncos
- Position: Linebacker
- Roster status: Practice squad

Personal information
- Born: September 24, 2003 (age 23); Petersburg, Virginia, U.S.
- Listed height: 6 ft 1 in (1.85 m)
- Listed weight: 232 lb (105 kg)

Career information
- High school: Fork Union Military (Fork Union, Virginia)
- College: Buffalo (2022–2025)
- NFL draft: 2026: 7th round, 257th overall pick

Career history
- Denver Broncos (2026−present)*
- * Offseason or practice squad member only

Awards and highlights
- 2× First-team All-MAC (2024, 2025); NCAA records: Career forced fumbles: 17; Forced fumbles in a season: 7 (Note: Tied with Jacob Rodriguez of the 2025 Texas Tech Red Raiders, Jake Hansen of the 2019 Illinois Fighting Illini, and Harold Landry of the 2016 Boston College Eagles.) (2024)
- Stats at Pro Football Reference

Khalil Elijah "Red" Murdock (born September 24, 2003) is an American professional football linebacker for the Denver Broncos of the National Football League (NFL). He played college football for the Buffalo Bulls and is the NCAA's all-time and single-season leader in career forced fumbles. Murdock was selected by the Broncos with the final pick of the 2026 NFL draft, making him that year’s Mr. Irrelevant.

== Early life ==
Murdock was a middle child, one of his single mother's six children. In the eighth grade, he achieved a perfect score on the Standards of Learning for English exam, a standardized test administered in Virginia.

Murdock attended high school at Hopewell located in Hopewell, Virginia. As a junior in 2019, he missed much of the season due to a hip injury but, along with teammate TreVeyon Henderson, he led Hopewell to a Virginia High School League championship. He underwent surgery after the season to repair a torn labrum. While at Hopewell, he completed an associate's degree at Brightpoint Community College via a dual enrollment program. He did not attract any attention from Division I football programs at Hopewell and made the decision to complete a post-graduate year at Fork Union Military Academy in Fork Union, Virginia to pursue a Division I scholarship. He helped lead Fork Union to an undefeated season but Buffalo was the only program to offer him a college football scholarship.

== College career ==
In his freshman season at the University at Buffalo in 2022, he redshirted but played in five games, recording six tackles and a pass deflection.

During the 2023 season, Murdock totaled 60 tackles with nine and a half being for a loss, two sacks, and four forced fumbles.

In May 2024, he earned a Bachelor of Arts in psychology. In week four of the 2024 season, he tallied 12 tackles and a forced fumble in an overtime win versus Northern Illinois. During the 2025 Bahamas Bowl, Murdock notched 13 tackles with three being for a loss, an interception which he returned for a touchdown in a victory over Liberty, where for his performance he was named the game's Defensive MVP. He finished the 2024 season, second in the nation with 156 tackles with 16.5 being for a loss, two sacks, an interception, seven forced fumbles, and a touchdown. His seven forced fumbles led the NCAA and his 156 total tackles were second behind only fellow Buffalo linebacker Shaun Dolac.

Heading into the 2025 season, Murdock was named a nominee for the Allstate AFCA Good Works Team. In a victory over Bowling Green, Murdock broke the NCAA record for career forced fumbles previously held by Buffalo linebacker Khalil Mack.

=== College statistics ===
| Year | Team | GP | Tackles | | | | | | Interceptions | | | | Fumbles | | |
| Year | Team | GP | Solo | Ast | Cmb | TFL | Sck | Yds | Int | Yds | PD | TD | FR | Yds | FF |
|---|---|---|---|---|---|---|---|---|---|---|---|---|---|---|---|
| 2022 | Buffalo (redshirt) | 5 | 6 | 0 | 6 | 0 | 0 | 0 | 0 | 0 | 1 | 0 | 0 | 0 | 0 |
| 2023 | Buffalo | 12 | 36 | 24 | 60 | 9.5 | 2 | 12 | 0 | 0 | 0 | 0 | 0 | 0 | 4 |
| 2024 | Buffalo | 13 | 73 | 83 | 156 | 16.5 | 2 | 11 | 1 | 31 | 1 | 1 | 0 | 0 | 7 |
| 2025 | Buffalo | 12 | 53 | 89 | 142 | 13.5 | 5 | 33 | 0 | 0 | 1 | 0 | 2 | 0 | 6 |
| Career | | 42 | 168 | 196 | 364 | 39.5 | 9 | 56 | 1 | 31 | 3 | 1 | 2 | 0 | 17 |

== Professional career ==
Pre-draft measurables
| Height | Weight | Arm length | Hand span | Wingspan | 40-yard dash | 10-yard split | 20-yard split | Vertical jump | Broad jump | Bench press |
|---|---|---|---|---|---|---|---|---|---|---|
| 6 ft 1 7/8 in (1.88 m) | 232 lb (105 kg) | 31 in (0.79 m) | 10 3/8 in (0.26 m) | 6 ft 5 5/8 in (1.97 m) | 4.79 s | 1.63 s | 2.63 s | 31.5 in (0.80 m) | 9 ft 6 in (2.90 m) | 22 reps |
All values from NFL Combine/Pro Day

Murdock was selected by the Denver Broncos in the seventh round (257th overall) of the 2026 NFL draft, making him that year's Mr. Irrelevant. On May 7, 2026, Murdock signed his four-year rookie contract with Denver. On August 30, he was waived by the Broncos as a part of final roster cuts. The next day, Murdock was re-signed to the team's practice squad.
