= Aurora Christian Schools =

Location
- 41.789798°N 88.366916°W

Information
- Enrollment: 558 (2016)
- Website: www.aurorachristian.org

Aurora Christian Schools (ACS) is a private Christian school with grades preschool through high school in Aurora, Illinois.

It opened as a Kindergarten through grade 9 school on September 3, 1975. Eighty-two students enrolled at the beginning of the first school year, and enrollment climbed to 114 at the end of the year. The private school has since expanded and now offers Pre-K through 12th.

== Athletics ==
Aurora Christian offers a total of thirteen varsity/non-varsity sports to its students. These include: cross country, football, golf, soccer, volleyball, boys' and girls' basketball, wrestling, baseball, softball, track, cheer, and poms.

== Notable alumni ==
- Ethan Hampton, college football quarterback
