= C. J. Ogbonna =

American football player (born 2001)

CJ Ogbonna
No. 7
- Position: Quarterback

Personal information
- Born: June 27, 2001 (age 25); Atlanta, Georgia, U.S.
- Listed height: 6 ft 2 in (1.88 m)
- Listed weight: 220 lb (100 kg)

Career information
- High school: Wheeler (Marietta, Georgia)
- College: Hutchinson (2019–2020); Southeast Missouri State (2021–2022); Buffalo (2023–2024)
- Stats at ESPN

C.J. Ogbonna (born June 27, 2001) is an American football quarterback. He previously played for the Hutchinson Blue Dragons, the Southeast Missouri State Redhawks and the Buffalo Bulls.

== Early life ==
Ogbonna was born in Atlanta, Georgia, but grew up in Marietta, Georgia where he attended Wheeler High School. In his high school career, Ogbonna completed 180 of his 316 pass attempts for 2,770 yards and 32 touchdowns, to 6 interceptions. Additionally, Ogbonna rushed for 88 yards and 2 touchdowns.

Out of high school, Ogbonna chose to play at the junior college (JUCO) level for Hutchinson Community College in Hutchinson, Kansas.

== College career ==
=== Hutchinson Community College ===
Ogbonna did not see any action in his freshman season in 2019. In the 2020-2021 season for Hutchinson, Ogbonna was the starting quarterback and played in 6 of the teams 8 games (missing two due to an injury.) He completed 57 of 92 passing attempts while recording 736 passing yards, 8 touchdowns and 2 interceptions. At the end of his sophomore season, Hutchinson was down 21-10 to Snow College in the NJCAA National Football Championship when Ogbonna entered the game with under 5 minutes in the 3rd quarter and Hutchinson won the game 29-27 with Ogbonna going 5-5 on passing attempts with 128 passing yards. Ogbonna decided to transfer to Southeast Missouri State shortly after the season.

=== Southeast Missouri State ===
Ogbonna started all 11 games for the team in the 2021 season and completed 111 of his 220 passes for 1,521 passing yards and 12 passing touchdowns, to 8 interceptions. Ogbonna also ran for 357 yards including 3 rushing touchdowns.

Ogbonna was named to the Ohio Valley Conference All-Newcomer Team in 2021.

After the 2022 season, Ogbonna decided to enter the transfer portal, and on January 16, 2023, he committed to play for Buffalo.

=== Buffalo ===
In Ogbonna's first season at Buffalo he sat behind Cole Snyder and was used as a change of pace quarterback with the threat of running. In the 2023 season, he recorded 214 rushing yards and 3 rushing touchdowns. Ogbonna became the starting quarterback for the 2024 season and led Buffalo to a 9 win season with a bowl game win, making it Buffalo's second season above 8 wins since joining NCAA Division I football in 1962. He finished the season with 190 completions on 336 attempts, 2,381 passing yards, 19 passing touchdowns, to 5 interceptions; while rushing for 343 yards on 123 attempts and scoring a career best 8 rushing touchdowns.

After first announcing he would be transferring on January 8, 2025, just weeks later on January 27, 2025, Ogbonna announced that he would be declaring for the 2025 NFL draft.

== College statistics ==
Year	Team	Games			Passing								Rushing			
Year	Team	GP	GS	Record	Cmp	Att	Pct	Yds	Avg	TD	Int	Rtg	Att	Yds	Avg	TD
2019	Hutchinson CC	0	0	—	0	0	0.0	0	-	0	0	0.0	0	0	-	0
2020-21	Hutchinson CC	6	5	5−0	57	92	62.0	736	8.0	8	3	151.3	29	94	3.2	1
2021	Southeast Missouri	11	11	4-7	111	220	50.5	1,521	6.9	12	8	119.3	94	357	3.8	3
2022	Southeast Missouri	7	0	—	2	9	22.2	6	0.7	0	0	27.8	16	52	3.3	0
2023	Buffalo	8	0	—	8	21	38.1	87	4.1	1	2	69.6	51	214	4.2	3
2024	Buffalo	13	13	9-4	190	336	56.5	2,381	7.1	19	5	131.8	123	343	2.8	8
NCAA Career		39	24	13-11	311	586	53.1	3,995	6.8	32	15	123.2	284	966	3.4	14
