= 2024 Buffalo Bulls football team =

American college football season

2024 Buffalo Bulls football

Bahamas Bowl champion

Bahamas Bowl, W 26–7 vs. Liberty
- Conference: Mid-American Conference
- Record: 9–4 (6–2 MAC)
- Head coach: Pete Lembo (1st season)
- Offensive coordinator: Dave Patenaude (1st season)
- Offensive scheme: Pro spread
- Defensive coordinator: Joe Bowen (1st season)
- Base defense: Multiple
- Captain: Game captains
- Home stadium: University at Buffalo Stadium

2024 Mid-American Conference football standings
	Conf.			Overall
Team	W		L	W		L
Ohio y$	7	–	1	11	–	3
Miami (OH) y	7	–	1	9	–	5
Buffalo	6	–	2	9	–	4
Bowling Green	6	–	2	7	–	6
Western Michigan	5	–	3	6	–	7
Toledo	4	–	4	8	–	5
Northern Illinois	4	–	4	8	–	5
Akron	3	–	5	4	–	8
Eastern Michigan	2	–	6	5	–	7
Central Michigan	2	–	6	4	–	8
Ball State	2	–	6	3	–	9
Kent State	0	–	8	0	–	12
Championship: Ohio 38, Miami (OH) 3
$ – Conference champion; y – Championship game participant

The 2024 Buffalo Bulls football team represented the University at Buffalo as a member of the Mid-American Conference (MAC) during the 2024 NCAA Division I FBS football season. Led by first-year head coach Pete Lembo, the Bulls compiled an overall record of 9–4 with a mark of 6–2 in conference play, tying for third place in the MAC. Buffalo was invited to the Bahamas Bowl, where the Bulls defeated Liberty. The team played home games at University at Buffalo Stadium in Amherst, New York.

On September 21, Buffalo beat No. 23 Northern Illinois for program's second win over a ranked NCAA Division I Football Bowl Subdivision (FBS) opponent and first since 2008.

== Schedule ==
Date	Time	Opponent	Site	TV	Result	Attendance
August 29	7:00 p.m.	No. 17 (FCS) Lafayette*	University at Buffalo Stadium; Amherst, NY	ESPN+	W 30–13	16,400
September 7	7:00 p.m.	at No. 9 Missouri*	Faurot Field; Columbia, MO	SECN+, ESPN+	L 0–38	62,621
September 14	1:00 p.m.	UMass*	University at Buffalo Stadium; Amherst, NY (rivalry)	CBSSN	W 34–3	15,204
September 21	3:30 p.m.	at No. 23 Northern Illinois	Huskie Stadium; DeKalb, IL	ESPN+	W 23–20 ^{OT}	18,688
September 28	12:00 p.m.	at UConn*	Pratt & Whitney Stadium at Rentschler Field; East Hartford, CT	CBSSN	L 3–47	20,347
October 12	12:00 p.m.	Toledo	University at Buffalo Stadium; Amherst, NY	ESPNU	W 30–15	13,996
October 19	3:30 p.m.	Western Michigan^{†}	University at Buffalo Stadium; Amherst, NY	ESPN+	L 41–48	18,487
October 26	12:00 p.m.	at Ohio	Peden Stadium; Athens, OH	CBSSN	L 16–47	16,048
November 2	12:00 p.m.	at Akron	InfoCision Stadium–Summa Field; Akron, OH	CBSSN	W 41–30	4,610
November 12	7:00 p.m.	Ball State	University at Buffalo Stadium; Amherst, NY	CBSSN	W 51–48 ^{OT}	12,708
November 20	7:00 p.m.	at Eastern Michigan	Rynearson Stadium; Ypsilanti, MI	ESPNU	W 37–20	12,004
November 26	7:00 p.m.	Kent State	University at Buffalo Stadium; Amherst, NY	ESPN+	W 43–7	11,916
January 4, 2025	11:00 a.m.	vs. Liberty*	Thomas Robinson Stadium; Nassau, Bahamas (Bahamas Bowl)	ESPN2	W 26–7	4,610
*Non-conference game; ^{†}Homecoming; Rankings from AP Poll and CFP Rankings released prior to game; All times are in Eastern time

== Preseason ==
=== Preseason poll ===
On July 19, the MAC announced the preseason coaches poll. Buffalo was picked to finish tenth in the conference. The Bulls received zero votes to win the MAC Championship.

== Game summaries ==
=== No. 17 (FCS) Lafayette ===
Game One – No. 17 (FCS) Lafayette Leopards (0–0) at Buffalo Bulls (0–0) – Game summary

Quarter	1	2	3	4	Total
No. 17 (FCS) Leopards	0	0	6	7	13
Bulls	13	3	7	7	30

at UB Stadium • Amherst, New York

- Date: Thursday, August 29, 2024
- Game time: 7:00 p.m. EDT
- Game weather: 76 °F (24 °C); Sunny
- Game attendance: 16,400
- Referee: Jeremy Valentine
- TV announcers (ESPN+): Anthony Lima (play-by-play) and Jordan Reid (analyst)
- Boxscore

Game information

First quarter

- (9:02) UB – Al-Jay Henderson 11-yard run (run failed) (Drive: 10 plays, 60 yards, 2:59; Buffalo 6-0)
- (3:17) UB – Nik McMillan 31-yard pass from C. J. Ogbonna (Nick Reed kick) (Drive: 5 plays, 48 yards, 2:04; Buffalo 13-0)

Second quarter

- (9:23) UB – Nick Reed 22-yard field goal (Drive: 8 plays, 49 yards, 2:55; Buffalo 16-0)

Third quarter

- (10:09) LAF – Dallas Holmes 18-yard pass from Carson Persing (pass failed) (Drive: 2 plays, 18 yards, 0:06; Buffalo 16-6)
- (6:10) UB – Taji Johnson 32-yard pass from C.J. Ogbonna (Nick Reed kick) (Drive: 8 plays, 75 yards, 2:23; Buffalo 23-6)

Fourth quarter

- (10:12) LAF – Chris Carasia 13-yard pass from Dean DeNobile (Jack Simonetta kick) (Drive: 11 plays, 66 yards, 4:02; Buffalo 23-13)
- (5:25) UB – Jacqez Barksdale 19-yard run (Nick Reed kick) (Drive: 1 play, 19 yards, 0:06; Buffalo 30-13)

Statistics	LAF	UB
First downs	14	23
Plays–yards	63–225	69–403
Rushing yards	28–45	45–208
Passing yards	180	195
Passing: Comp–Att–Int	24–35–2	14–24–0
Time of possession	28:47	31:13

Team	Category	Player	Statistics
Lafayette	Passing	Dean DeNobile	23/33, 162 yards, TD, 2 INT
Lafayette	Rushing	Troy Bruce	4 carries, 29 yards
Lafayette	Receiving	Chris Carasia	8 receptions, 83 yards, TD
Buffalo	Passing	C. J. Ogbonna	14/24, 195 yards, 2 TD
Buffalo	Rushing	Jacqez Barksdale	14 carries, 99 yards, TD
Buffalo	Receiving	Nik McMillan	5 receptions, 76 yards, TD

=== at No. 9 Missouri ===
Game Two – Buffalo Bulls (1–0) at No. 9 Missouri Tigers (1–0) – Game summary

Quarter	1	2	3	4	Total
Bulls	0	0	0	0	0
No. 9 Tigers	3	21	7	7	38

at Faurot Field • Columbia, Missouri

- Date: Saturday, September 7, 2024
- Game time: 6 p.m. CDT
- Game weather: 70 °F (21 °C); Sunny; Wind at NE9 MPH
- Game attendance: 62,621
- Referee: Kyle Olson
- TV announcers (SECN+/ESPN+): Lowell Galindo (play-by-play) and Fozzy Whittaker (analyst)
- Boxscore

Game information

First quarter

- (10:47) MIZZ: Blake Craig 51 yard field goal (Drive: 7 plays, 26 yards, 3:21; Missouri 3-0)

Second quarter

- (12:13) MIZZ: Luther Burden III 3 yard run (Blake Craig Kick) (Drive: 10 plays, 64 yards, 5:09; Missouri 10-0)
- (6:12) MIZZ: Brady Cook 3 yard run (Blake Craig Kick) (Drive: 9 plays, 69 yards, 3:55; Missouri 17-0)
- (1:51) MIZZ: Brady Cook 31 yard run (Blake Craig Kick) (Drive: 4 plays, 55 yards, 1:12; Missouri 24-0)

Third quarter

- (1:00) MIZZ: Nate Noel 4 yard run (Blake Craig Kick) (Drive: 8 plays, 47 yards, 4:17; Missouri 31-0)

Fourth quarter

- (0:31) MIZZ: Jamal Roberts yard run (Blake Craig Kick) (Drive: 10 plays, 53 yards, 3:08; Missouri 38-0)

Statistics	UB	MIZZ
First downs	9	28
Plays–yards	52–169	83–518
Rushing yards	114	255
Passing yards	55	263
Passing: Comp–Att–Int	6–20–1	34–42–1
Time of possession	21:39	38:21

Team	Category	Player	Statistics
Buffalo	Passing	C.J. Ogbonna	6/20, 55 yards, INT
Buffalo	Rushing	Jacqez Barksdale	15 carries, 67 yards
Buffalo	Receiving	Victor Snow	4 receptions, 41 yards
Missouri	Passing	Brady Cook	28/36, 228 yards, INT
Missouri	Rushing	Nate Noel	12 carries, 73 yards, TD
Missouri	Receiving	Theo Wease	13 receptions, 149 yards

=== UMass ===
Game Three – UMass Minutemen (0–2) at Buffalo Bulls (1–1) – Game summary

Quarter	1	2	3	4	Total
Minutemen	0	3	0	0	3
Bulls	7	3	17	7	34

at UB Stadium • Amherst, New York

- Date: Saturday, September 14, 2024
- Game time: 1:00 p.m. EDT
- Game weather: 82 °F (28 °C); Sunny
- Game attendance: 15,204
- Referee: Andrew Speciale
- TV announcers (CBSSN): Jordan Kent (play-by-play) and Logan Ryan (analyst)
- Boxscore

Game information

First quarter

- (10:06) UB – JJ Jenkins 40-yard pass from C. J. Ogbonna, Upton Bellenfant kick (Drive: 6 plays, 85 yards, 2:01; Buffalo 7-0)

Second quarter

- (11:52) UB – Upton Bellenfant 37-yard field goal (Drive: 6 plays, 18 yards, 2:14; Buffalo 10-0)
- (1:50) UMASS – Jacob Lurie 34-yard field goal (Drive: 13 plays, 39 yards, 6:20; Buffalo 10-3)

Third quarter

- (11:24) UB – Upton Bellenfant 34-yard field goal (Drive: 10 plays, 55 yards, 3:22; Buffalo 13-3)
- (4:38) UB – C. J. Ogbonna 8-yard run, Upton Bellenfant kick (Drive: 2 plays, 20 yards, 0:35; Buffalo 20-3)
- (0:00) UB – Marquis Cooper 100-yard interception, Upton Bellenfant kick (Buffalo 27-3)

Fourth quarter

- (4:54) UB – Lamar Sperling 1-yard run, Upton Bellenfant kick (Drive: 13 plays, 75 yards, 8:07; Buffalo 34-3)

Statistics	UMASS	UB
First downs	11	15
Plays–yards	66–193	60–314
Rushing yards	37–72	38–129
Passing yards	121	185
Passing: Comp–Att–Int	14–29–1	14–22–0
Time of possession	44:00	27:56

Team	Category	Player	Statistics
UMass	Passing	Taisun Phommachanh	14/29, 121 yards, INT
UMass	Rushing	Brandon Campbell	8 carries, 36 yards
UMass	Receiving	Jacquon Gibson	4 receptions, 58 yards
Buffalo	Passing	C.J. Ogbonna	14/22, 185 yards, TD
Buffalo	Rushing	Lamar Sperling	16 carries, 86 yards, TD
Buffalo	Receiving	JJ Jenkins	2 receptions, 44 yards, TD

=== at No. 23 Northern Illinois ===
Game Four – Buffalo Bulls (2–1) at No. 23 Northern Illinois Huskies (2–0) – Game summary

Quarter	1	2	3	4	OT	Total
Bulls	0	3	7	10	3	23
No. 23 Huskies	7	7	0	6	0	20

at Huskie Stadium • DeKalb, Illinois

- Date: Saturday September 21, 2024
- Game time: 3:30 p.m. EDT
- Game weather: Sunny • Temperature: 88 °F (31 °C) • Wind: N 9 mph
- Game attendance: 18,688
- Referee: David Siegle
- TV announcers (ESPN+): Jason Ross Jr. (play-by-play) and Tyoka Jackson (analyst)
- Boxscore

Game information

First quarter

- (5:14) NIU – Antario Brown 5-yard run, Kanon Woodill kick (Drive: 13 plays, 66 yards, 6:36; Northern Illinois 7-0)

Second quarter

- (7:18) UB – Upton Bellenfant 42-yard field goal (Drive: 11 plays, 54 yards, 5:26; Northern Illinois 7-3)
- (1:55) NIU – Antario Brown 14-yard run, Kanon Woodill kick (Drive: 2 plays, 36 yards, 0:16; Northern Illinois 14-3)

Third quarter

- (10:59) UB – Victor Snow 46-yard pass from C. J. Ogbonna, Upton Bellenfant kick (Drive: 6 plays, 59 yards, 2:32; Northern Illinois 14-10)

Fourth quarter

- (14:51) NIU – Kanon Woodill 30-yard field goal (Drive: 11 plays, 57 yards, 5:44; Northern Illinois 17-10)
- (12:02) UB – Al-Jay Henderson 36-yard run, Upton Bellenfant kick (Drive: 7 plays, 75 yards, 2:49; Tied 17-17)
- (3:28) UB – Upton Bellenfant 42-yard field goal (Drive: 4 plays, -4 yards, 2:11; Buffalo 20-17)
- (0:24) NIU – Kanon Woodill 27-yard field goal (Drive: 13 plays, 66 yards, 3:04; Tied 20-20)

Overtime

- (0:00) UB – Upton Bellenfant 37-yard field goal (Drive: 4 plays, 6 yards, 0:00; Buffalo 23-20)

Statistics	UB	NIU
First downs	9	24
Plays–yards	54–184	85–359
Rushing yards	37–77	42–165
Passing yards	107	194
Passing: Comp–Att–Int	10–17–0	23–43–1
Time of possession	23:47	36:13

Team	Category	Player	Statistics
Buffalo	Passing	C. J. Ogbonna	10/17, 107 yards, TD
Buffalo	Rushing	Al-Jay Henderson	11 carries, 56 yards, TD
Buffalo	Receiving	Victor Snow	3 receptions, 72 yards, TD
Northern Illinois	Passing	Ethan Hampton	23/43, 194 yards, INT
Northern Illinois	Rushing	Antario Brown	24 carries, 73 yards, 2 TD
Northern Illinois	Receiving	Cam Thompson	3 receptions, 49 yards

=== at UConn ===
Game Five – Buffalo Bulls (3–1) at UConn Huskies (2–2) – Game summary

Quarter	1	2	3	4	Total
Bulls	0	3	0	0	3
Huskies	10	13	14	10	47

at Pratt & Whitney Stadium at Rentschler Field • East Hartford, Connecticut

- Date: Saturday September 28, 2024
- Game time: 12:00 p.m. EDT
- Game weather: Cloudy • Temperature: 73 °F (23 °C) • Wind: E at 8 miles per hour (13 km/h)
- Game attendance: 20,347
- Referee: Riley Johnson
- TV announcers (CBSSN): Jordan Kent (play-by-play), Logan Ryan (color analyst) & Keiana Martin (sideline)
- Boxscore

Game information

First quarter

- (8:49) CONN - Chris Freeman 26-yard field goal (Drive: 12 plays, 58 yards, 5:11; UConn 3-0)
- (4:32) CONN - Cam Edwards 43-yard run, Chris Freeman kick (Drive: 4 plays, 57 yards, 2:01; UConn 10-0)

Second quarter

- (11:09) CONN - Chris Freeman 39-yard field goal (Drive: 11 plays, 46 yards, 3:59; UConn 13-0)
- (5:18) CONN - Chris Freeman 22-yard field goal (Drive: 4 plays, 18 yards, 1:12; UConn 16-0)
- (1:13) CONN - Skyler Bell 40-yard pass from Joe Fagnano, Chris Freeman kick (Drive: 7 plays, 64 yards, 1:17; UConn 23-0)
- (0:00) BUF - Upton Bellenfant 47-yard field goal (Drive: 7 plays, 46 yards, 1:13; UConn 23-3)

Third quarter

- (14:12) CONN - Skyler Bell 70-yard pass from Joe Fagnano, Chris Freeman kick (Drive: 3 plays, 75 yards, 0:48; UConn 30-3)
- (5:33) CONN - Skyler Bell 12-yard pass from Joe Fagnano, Chris Freeman kick (Drive: 6 plays, 57 yards, 2:38; UConn 37-3)

Fourth quarter

- (14:56) CONN - Mel Brown 23-yard run (Chris Freeman kick) (Drive: 4 plays, 83 yards, 2:06; UConn 44-3)
- (12:00) CONN - Chris Freeman 27-yard field goal (Drive: 6 plays, 41 yards, 1:50; UConn 47-3)

Statistics	UB	CONN
First downs	12	28
Plays–yards	63–198	79–537
Rushing yards	27–75	46–257
Passing yards	123	280
Passing: Comp–Att–Int	16–36–1	19–33–0
Time of possession	25:40	34:20

Team	Category	Player	Statistics
Buffalo	Passing	CJ Ogbonna	12/25, 82 yards
Buffalo	Rushing	CJ Ogbonna	14 carries, 38 yards
Buffalo	Receiving	JJ Jenkins	5 receptions, 32 yards
UConn	Passing	Joe Fagnano	11/19, 217 yards, 3 TD
UConn	Rushing	Cam Edwards	10 carries, 97 yards, TD
UConn	Receiving	Skyler Bell	6 receptions, 153 yards, 3 TD

=== Toledo ===
Game Six – Toledo Rockets (4–1) at Buffalo Bulls (3–2) – Game summary

Quarter	1	2	3	4	Total
Rockets	0	0	7	8	15
Bulls	7	0	14	9	30

at UB Stadium • Amherst, New York

- Date: Saturday October 12, 2024
- Game time: 12:00 p.m.
- Game weather: Sunny, 58 °F (14 °C)
- Game attendance: 13,996
- Referee: Greg Sujack
- TV announcers (ESPNU): Courtney Lyle (play-by-play) and Rene Ingoglia (analyst)
- Boxscore

Game information

First quarter

- (04:55) BUF TD: Victor Snow 2-yard run (Upton Bellenfant kick) BUF 3–0; 8 plays, 81 yards, 4:21

Second quarter

No scoring plays

Third quarter

- (10:40) BUF TD: Jake Orlando 2-yard pass from C.J. Ogbonna (Upton Bellenfant kick) BUF 14–0; 10 plays, 81 yards, 4:15
- (04:19) BUF TD: C.J. Ogbonna 2-yard run (Upton Bellenfant kick) BUF 21–0; 1 plays, 2 yards, 00:04
- (02:29) TOL TD: Jerjuan Newton 26-yard pass from John Alan Richter (Dylan Cunanan kick) BUF 21–7; 10 plays, 81 yards, 4:15

Fourth quarter

- (13:52) BUF TD: C.J. Ogbonna 1-yard run (Upton Bellenfant miss kick) BUF 27–7; 8 plays, 49 yards, 3:18
- (09:13) BUF FG: Upton Bellenfant 23-yard field goal BUF 30–7; 13 plays, 75 yards, 4:05
- (05:08) TOL TD: Jerjuan Newton 23-yard pass from John Alan Richter, two-point conversion pass Anthony Torres from John Alan Richter BUF 30–15; 13 plays, 75 yards, 4:05

Statistics	TOL	UB
First downs	21	19
Plays–yards	75–418	72–357
Rushing yards	46	230
Passing yards	372	127
Passing: Comp–Att–Int	30–49–0	11–20–0
Time of possession	26:08	33:52

Team	Category	Player	Statistics
Toledo	Passing	John Richter	16/23, 227 yards, 2 TD
Toledo	Rushing	Tucker Gleason	6 carries, 20 yards
Toledo	Receiving	Jurjuan Newton	7 receptions, 159 yards, 2 TD
Buffalo	Passing	CJ Ogbonna	11/20, 127 yards, TD
Buffalo	Rushing	Al-Jay Henderson	18 carries, 142 yards
Buffalo	Receiving	JJ Jenkins	2 receptions, 43 yards

=== Western Michigan ===
Game Seven – Western Michigan Broncos (3–3) at Buffalo Bulls (4–2) – Game summary

Quarter	1	2	3	4	Total
Broncos	7	21	7	13	48
Bulls	10	7	7	17	41

at UB Stadium • Amherst, New York

- Date: Saturday October 19, 2024
- Game time: 3:30 p.m.
- Game weather: Sunny, 66 °F (19 °C)
- Game attendance: 18,487
- Referee: Billy Williams
- TV announcers (ESPN+): Anthony Lima (play-by-play) and Je'Rod Cherry (analyst)
- Boxscore

Game information

First quarter

- (13:38) BUF TD: Messiah Burch 7-yard run (Upton Bellenfant kick) BUF 7–0; 2 plays, 7 yards, 0:00
- (11:12) WMU TD: Blake Bosma 16-yard pass from Hayden Wolff (Luka Zurak kick) Tie 7–7; 6 plays, 75 yards, 2:26
- (08:32) BUF FG: Upton Bellenfant 26-yard field goal BUF 10–7; 7 plays, 61 yards, 2:40

Second quarter

- (13:38) WMU TD: Jaden Nixon 1-yard run (Luka Zurak kick) WMU 14–10; 10 plays, 69 yards, 0:43
- (08:49) WMU TD: Blake Bosma 14-yard pass from Hayden Wolff (Luka Zurak kick) WMU 21–10; 6 plays, 77 yards, 2:56
- (07:55) WMU TD: Blake Bosma 12-yard pass from Hayden Wolff (Luka Zurak kick) WMU 28–10; 3 plays, 13 yards, 0:48
- (03:22) BUF TD: Victor Snow 26-yard pass from C.J. Ogbonna (Upton Bellenfant kick) WMU 28–17; 9 plays, 71 yards, 4:26

Third quarter

- (08:21) WMU TD: Jaden Nixon 2-yard run (Luka Zurak kick) WMU 35–17; 9 plays, 76 yards, 4:25
- (05:47) BUF TD: Taji Johnson 11-yard pass from C.J. Ogbonna (Upton Bellenfant kick) WMU 35–24; 7 plays, 65 yards, 2:29

Fourth quarter

- (14:52) BUF TD: Victor Snow 12-yard run, pass failed WMU 35–30; 12 plays, 71 yards, 0:08
- (11:45) WMU FG: Luka Zurak 35-yard field goal WMU 38–30; 8 plays, 56 yards, 3:03
- (11:08) BUF TD: Al-Jay Henderson 68-yard run, two-point conversion pass Chance Morrow from C.J. Ogbonna Tie 38–38; 3 plays, 75 yards, 0:37
- (08:59) WMU FG: Luka Zurak 37-yard field goal WMU 41–38; 4 plays, 2 yards, 1:59
- (02:43) WMU TD: Jaden Nixon 54-yard run (Luka Zurak kick) WMU 48–38; 8 plays, 85 yards, 4:27
- (01:02) BUF FG: Upton Bellenfant 22-yard field goal WMU 48–41; 9 plays, 58 yards, 1:36

Statistics	WMU	UB
First downs	26	23
Plays–yards	74–489	73–551
Rushing yards	209	242
Passing yards	280	309
Passing: Comp–Att–Int	20–31–0	22–34–0
Time of possession	33:22	26:38

Team	Category	Player	Statistics
Western Michigan	Passing	Hayden Wolff	20/31, 280 yards, 3 TD
Western Michigan	Rushing	Jaden Nixon	14 carries, 112 yards, 3 TD
Western Michigan	Receiving	Blake Bosma	6 receptions, 85 yards, 3 TD
Buffalo	Passing	C.J. Ogbonna	22/34, 309 yards, 2 TD
Buffalo	Rushing	Al-Jay Henderson	12 carries, 97 yards, TD
Buffalo	Receiving	Victor Snow	7 receptions, 84 yards, TD

=== at Ohio ===
Game Eight – Buffalo Bulls (4–3) at Ohio Bobcats (4–3) – Game summary

Quarter	1	2	3	4	Total
Bulls	0	10	6	16	32
Bobcats	3	21	9	14	47

at Peden Stadium • Athens, Ohio

- Date: Saturday October 26, 2024
- Game time: 12:00 p.m.
- Game weather: Sunny • Temperature: 58 °F (14 °C)
- Game attendance: 16,048
- Referee: Greg Sujack
- TV announcers (CBSSN): Dave Ryan (play-by-play) and Adam Brenemen (analyst)

Game information

First quarter

- (01:38) OHIO – Gianni Spetic 23-yard field goal, Drive: 11 plays, 65 yards, 5:38; OHIO 3–0

Second quarter

- (12:47) BUFF – Messiah Burch 27-yard run (Upton Bellenfant kick), Drive: 8 plays, 75 yards, 3:51; BUFF 7–3
- (08:21) OHIO – Rickey Hunt Jr. 46-yard run (Gianni Spetic kick), Drive: 9 plays, 80 yards, 4:21; OHIO 10–7
- (06:12) OHIO – Coleman Owen 65-yard pass from Parker Navarro (Gianni Spetic kick), Drive: 2 plays, 73 yards, 0:52; OHIO 17–7
- (03:23) BUFF – Upton Bellenfant 40-yard field goal, Drive: 7 plays, 53 yards, 2:49; OHIO 17–10
- (06:12) OHIO – Coleman Owen 13-yard pass from Parker Navarro (Gianni Spetic kick), Drive: 7 plays, 75 yards, 2:20; OHIO 24–10

Third quarter

- (08:21) OHIO – Nolan McCormick 2-yard run (Gianni Spetic kick), Drive: 6 plays, 80 yards, 3:05; OHIO 31–10
- (02:28) BUFF – Victor Snow 21-yard pass from C.J Ogbanna (pass failed), Drive: 11 plays, 75 yards, 3:41; OHIO 31–16
- (02:28) OHIO – Kadin Schmitz 100-yard Defensive PAT Conversion, OHIO 33–16

Fourth quarter

- (08:21) OHIO – Coleman Owen 22-yard run (Gianni Spetic kick), Drive: 6 plays, 57 yards, 2:41; OHIO 40–16
- (02:28) OHIO – Shay Taylor 30-yard Interception Return (Gianni Spetic kick), OHIO 47–16

Statistics	UB	OHIO
First downs	22	22
Plays–yards	72–383	60–489
Rushing yards	33–126	41–258
Passing yards	257	231
Passing: Comp–Att–Int	24–39–1	14–19–1
Time of possession	29:29	30:31

Team	Category	Player	Statistics
Buffalo	Passing	C. J. Ogbonna	24/39, 257 yards, TD, INT
Buffalo	Rushing	Al-Jay Henderson	14 carries, 81 yards
Buffalo	Receiving	Victor Snow	5 receptions, 75 yards, TD
Ohio	Passing	Parker Navarro	14/19, 231 yards, 2 TD, INT
Ohio	Rushing	Rickey Hunt Jr.	9 carries, 89 yards, TD
Ohio	Receiving	Coleman Owen	6 receptions, 146 yards, 2 TD

=== at Akron ===
Game Nine – Buffalo Bulls (4–4) at Akron Zips (2–6) – Game summary

Quarter	1	2	3	4	Total
Bulls	14	10	14	3	41
Zips	7	0	0	23	30

at InfoCision Stadium • Akron, Ohio

- Date: Saturday November 2, 2024
- Game time: 12:00 p.m.
- Game weather: Sunny • Temperature: 52 °F (11 °C)
- Game attendance: 4,610
- Referee: David Siegle
- TV announcers (CBSSN): John Sadak (play-by-play) and Randy Cross (analyst)

Game information

First quarter

- (13:16) AKR – Ahmarian Granger 29-yard pass from Ben Finley (Garrison Smith kick), Drive: 5 plays, 71 yards, 1:44; AKR 7–0
- (07:50) BUFF – JJ Jenkins 18-yard pass from C.J. Ogbonna (Upton Bellenfant kick), Drive: 2 plays, 62 yards, 0:39; Tied 7–7
- (04:35) BUFF – Jacqez Barksdale 1-yard run (Upton Bellenfant kick), Drive: 8 plays, 23 yards, 2:58; BUFF 14–7

Second quarter

- (14:19) BUFF – Upton Bellenfant 33-yard field goal, Drive: 9 plays, 30 yards, 3:42; BUFF 17–7
- (08:04) BUFF – Jake Orlando 2-yard pass from C.J. Ogbonna (Upton Bellenfant kick), Drive: 11 plays, 88 yards, 4:17; BUFF 24–7

Third quarter

- (13:03) BUFF – Al-Jay Henderson 45-yard run (Upton Bellenfant kick), Drive: 6 plays, 77 yards, 1:48; BUFF 31–7
- (02:33) BUFF – C.J. Ogbonna 8-yard run (Upton Bellenfant kick), Drive: 4 plays, 44 yards, 1:57; BUFF 38–7

Fourth quarter

- (14:51) AKR – Adrian Norton 28-yard pass from Ben Finley (Tahj Bullock pass to Adrian Norton for 2-point conversion), Drive: 10 plays, 88 yards, 2:32; BUFF 38–15
- (09:25) AKR – Adrian Norton 25-yard pass from Ben Finley (Garrison Smith kick), Drive: 8 plays, 75 yards, 3:07; BUFF 38–22
- (04:39) AKR – Kyan Mason 28-yard pass from Ben Finley (Tahj Bullock run for 2-point conversion), Drive: 11 plays, 72 yards, 2:32; BUFF 38–30
- (02:38) BUFF – Upton Bellenfant 36-yard field goal, Drive: 4 plays, 4 yards, 0:21; BUFF 41–30

Statistics	UB	AKR
First downs	19	23
Total yards	390	452
Rushing yards	180	74
Passing yards	210	378
Passing: Comp–Att–Int	17-29-0	23-43-1
Time of possession	32:56	27:04

Team	Category	Player	Statistics
Buffalo	Passing	C.J. Ogbonna	17/29, 210 yards, 2 TD
Buffalo	Rushing	Al-Jay Henderson	18 carries, 107 yards, TD
Buffalo	Receiving	JJ Jenkins	5 receptions, 57 yards, TD
Akron	Passing	Ben Finley	23/42, 378 yards, 4 TD, INT
Akron	Rushing	Jordon Simmons	14 carries, 68 yards
Akron	Receiving	Adrian Norton	6 receptions, 98 yards, 2 TD

=== Ball State ===
Game Ten – Ball State Cardinals (3–6) at Buffalo Bulls (5–4) – Game summary

Quarter	1	2	3	4	OT	Total
Ball State	7	21	7	10	3	48
Buffalo	7	17	7	14	6	51

at UB Stadium • Amherst, New York

- Date: Tuesday November 12, 2024
- Game time: 7:00 p.m.
- Game weather: Sunny, 41 °F (5 °C)
- Game attendance: 12,708
- Referee: Matt Packowski
- TV announcers (CBSSN): Dave Ryan (play-by-play) and Adam Breneman (analyst)

Game information

First quarter

- (7:47) BUFF – C.J. Ogbonna 3-yard run (Upton Bellenfant kick) (Drive: 16 plays, 75 yards, 7:13; Buffalo 7-0)
- (4:34) BALL – Justin Bowick 23-yard pass from Kadin Semonza (Jackson Courville kick) (Drive: 7 plays, 81 yards, 3:08; Tied 7-7)

Second quarter

- (14:55) BALL – Tanner Koziol 2-yard pass from Kadin Semonza (Jackson Courville kick) (Drive: 7 plays, 73 yards, 3:16; Ball State 14-7)
- (12:06) BUFF – Upton Bellenfant 27-yard field goal (Drive: 8 plays, 53 yards, 2:39; Ball State 14-10)
- (8:14) BALL – Vaughn Pemberton 1-yard run (Jackson Courville kick) (Drive: 7 plays, 77 yards, 3:45; Ball State 21-10)
- (3:40) BUFF – Al-Jay Henderson 6-yard run (Upton Bellenfant kick) (Drive: 6 plays, 80 yards, 1:42; Ball State 21-17)
- (1:12) BALL – Justin Bowick 22-yard pass from Kadin Semonza (Jackson Courville kick) (Drive: 6 plays, 63 yards, 2:20; Ball State 28-17)
- (0:00) BUFF – Victor Snow 2-yard pass from C.J. Ogbonna (Upton Bellenfant kick) (Drive: 2 plays, 2 yards, 0:09; Ball State 28-24)

Third quarter

- (5:56) BUFF – Al-Jay Henderson 4-yard run (Upton Bellenfant kick) (Drive: 9 plays, 63 yards, 4:41; Buffalo 31-28)
- (2:46) BALL – Cam Pickett 65-yard pass from Kadin Semonza (Jackson Courville kick) (Drive: 2 plays, 65 yards, 0:16; Ball State 35-31)

Fourth quarter

- (14:56) BALL – Cam Pickett 9-yard run (Jackson Courville kick) (Drive: 4 plays, 19 yards, 2:13; Ball State 42-31)
- (7:08) BALL – Jackson Courville 27-yard field goal (Drive: 9 plays, 58 yards, 5:00; Ball State 45-31)
- (5:43) BUFF – C.J. Ogbonna 26-yard run (run failed) (Drive: 8 plays, 75 yards, 1:25; Ball State 45-37)
- (1:49) BUFF – JJ Jenkins 33-yard pass from C.J. Ogbonna (C.J. Ogbonna pass to Jake Orlando) (Drive: 10 plays, 73 yards, 1:27; Tied 45-45)

Overtime

- BALL – Jackson Courville 36-yard field goal (Drive: 4 plays, 6 yards, 0:00; Ball State 48-45)
- BUFF – Lamar Sperling 14-yard pass from C.J. Ogbonna (Drive: 2 plays, 25 yards, 0:00; Buffalo 51-48)

Statistics	BALL	UB
First downs	24	26
Plays–yards	74–520	78–470
Rushing yards	37–193	41–206
Passing yards	327	264
Passing: Comp–Att–Int	25–37–1	19–37–2
Time of possession	33:13	26:26

Team	Category	Player	Statistics
Ball State	Passing	Kadin Semonza	25/37, 327 yards, 4 TD, INT
Ball State	Rushing	Kadin Semonza	4 carries, 53 yards
Ball State	Receiving	Justin Bowick	7 receptions, 148 yards, 2 TD
Buffalo	Passing	C.J. Ogbonna	19/37, 264 yards, 3 TD, 2 INT
Buffalo	Rushing	Al-Jay Henderson	27 carries, 126 yards, 2 TD
Buffalo	Receiving	JJ Jenkins	8 receptions, 131 yards, TD

=== at Eastern Michigan ===
Game Eleven – Buffalo Bulls (6–4) at Eastern Michigan Eagles (5–5) – Game summary

Quarter	1	2	3	4	Total
Bulls	8	9	6	14	37
Eagles	0	0	13	7	20

at Rynearson Stadium • Ypsilanti, Michigan

- Date: Wednesday November 20, 2024
- Game time: 7:00 p.m.
- Game weather: Clear • Temperature: 40 °F (4 °C) • Wind: SW 9 miles per hour (14 km/h)
- Game attendance: 12,004
- Referee: David Siegle
- TV announcers (ESPNU): Justin Kutcher (play-by-play) and Rene Ingoglia (analyst)
- Boxscore

Game information

First quarter

- (8:47) BUF – JJ Jenkins 90-yard pass from C. J. Ogbonna, Andrew Schnackenberg rush (Drive: 1 play, 90 yards, 0:13; Buffalo 8–0)

Second quarter

- (9:23) BUF – Dion Crawford 0-yard safety (Buffalo 10–0)
- (2:08) BUF – Victor Snow 7-yard pass from C. J. Ogbonna, Upton Bellenfant kick (Drive: 15 plays, 80 yards, 7:10; Buffalo 17–0)

Third quarter

- (9:51) EMU – Terry Lockett 38-yard pass from Cole Snyder, Jesus Gomez kick (Drive: 9 plays, 90 yards, 3:17; Buffalo 17–7)
- (5:14) BUF – Al-Jay Henderson 1-yard run (Drive: 10 plays, 75 yards, 4:37; Buffalo 23–7)
- (0:52) EMU – Terry Lockett 13-yard pass from Cole Snyder, Jesus Gomez kick (Drive: 9 plays, 75 yards, 4:22; Buffalo 23–13)

Fourth quarter

- (8:54) EMU – Markus Allen 78-yard pass from Cole Snyder, Jesus Gomez kick (Drive: 2 plays, 90 yards, 0:33; Buffalo 23–20)
- (8:43) BUF – Al-Jay Henderson 75-yard pass from C. J. Ogbonna, Upton Bellenfant kick (Drive: 1 play, 75 yards, 0:11; Buffalo 30–20)
- (2:59) BUF – Shaun Dolac 60-yard interception, Upton Bellenfant kick (Buffalo 37–20)

Statistics	UB	EMU
First downs	20	20
Plays–yards	69–396	70–445
Rushing yards	136	70
Passing yards	260	375
Passing: Comp–Att–Int	18–28–0	27–39–3
Time of possession	31:48	28:12

Team	Category	Player	Statistics
Buffalo	Passing	C. J. Ogbonna	18/28, 260 yards, 3 TD
Buffalo	Rushing	Al-Jay Henderson	25 carries, 86 yards, TD
Buffalo	Receiving	JJ Jenkins	5 receptions, 120 yards, TD
Eastern Michigan	Passing	Cole Snyder	24/33, 351 yards, 3 TD, 2 INT
Eastern Michigan	Rushing	Delbert Mimms III	12 carries, 49 yards
Eastern Michigan	Receiving	Markus Allen	9 receptions, 187 yards, TD

=== Kent State ===
Game Twelve – Kent State Golden Flashes (0–11) at Buffalo Bulls (7–4) – Game summary

Quarter	1	2	3	4	Total
Golden Flashes	0	0	7	0	7
Bulls	13	13	7	10	43

at UB Stadium • Amherst, New York

- Date: Tuesday November 26, 2024
- Game time: 7:00 p.m.
- Game weather: Clear • Temperature: 41 °F (5 °C) • Wind: SW 12 miles per hour (19 km/h)
- Game attendance: 11,916
- Referee: Rich Edwards
- TV announcers (ESPN+): Michael Reghi (play-by-play) and Ryan Cavanaugh (analyst)

Game information

First quarter

- (11:41) BUF – C. J. Ogbonna 12-yard run, Upton Bellenfant kick (Drive: 11 plays, 75 yards, 3:19; Buffalo 7–0)
- (5:35) BUF – Tadd Barr 39-yard pass from C. J. Ogbonna (Drive: 9 plays, 91 yards, 4:12; Buffalo 13–0)

Second quarter

- (12:39) BUF – Victor Snow 18-yard pass from C. J. Ogbonna (Drive: 4 plays, 54 yards, 1:40; Buffalo 19–0)
- (3:20) BUF – Al-Jay Henderson 20-yard run, Upton Bellenfant kick (Drive: 6 plays, 65 yards, 3:01; Buffalo 26–0)

Third quarter

- (11:24) KSU – Luke Floriea 27-yard pass from Tommy Ulatowski, Will Hryszko kick (Drive: 4 plays, 39 yards, 1:36; Buffalo 26–7)
- (6:40) BUF – C. J. Ogbonna 11-yard run, Upton Bellenfant kick (Drive: 6 plays, 41 yards, 1:34; Buffalo 33–7)

Fourth quarter

- (14:47) BUF – Upton Bellenfant 42-yard field goal (Drive: 9 plays, 49 yards, 3:43; Buffalo 36–7)
- (5:17) BUF – Javien Cuff 24-yard pass from C. J. Ogbonna, Upton Bellenfant kick (Drive: 4 plays, 42 yards, 2:07; Buffalo 43–7)

Statistics	KENT	UB
First downs	10	26
Plays–yards	54–208	74–446
Rushing yards	106	253
Passing yards	102	193
Passing: Comp–Att–Int	10–18–1	14–22–1
Time of possession	28:41	31:19

Team	Category	Player	Statistics
Kent State	Passing	Tommy Ulatowski	7/12, 91 yards, TD
Kent State	Rushing	Jahzae Kimbrough	14 carries, 65 yards
Kent State	Receiving	Jay Jay Etheridge	6 receptions, 64 yards
Buffalo	Passing	C. J. Ogbonna	14/22, 193 yards, 3 TD, INT
Buffalo	Rushing	Al-Jay Henderson	30 carries, 185 yards, TD
Buffalo	Receiving	Victor Snow	8 receptions, 99 yards, TD

=== vs. Liberty (Bahamas Bowl) ===
2025 Bahamas Bowl
Buffalo Bulls (8–4) vs. Liberty Flames (8–3) – Game summary

Quarter	1	2	3	4	Total
Bulls	6	3	7	10	26
Flames	0	0	0	7	7

at Thomas Robinson Stadium • Nassau, Bahamas

- Date: Saturday January 4, 2025
- Game time: 11:00 a.m.
- Game weather: Partly cloudy • Temperature: 72 °F (22 °C) • Wind: NNE at 15 miles per hour (24 km/h)
- Game attendance: 4,610
- Referee: Darryl DeBerry
- TV announcers (ESPN2): Matt Schumacker (play-by-play), Dustin Fox (analyst) and Coley Harvey (sideline)
- Box score

Game information

First Quarter

- (10:30) BUFF – Upton Bellenfant 52 yard field goal (Drive: 7 plays, 29 yards, 3:00; Buffalo 3–0)
- (5:37) BUFF – Upton Bellenfant 43 yard field goal (Drive: 7 plays, 42 yards, 3:24; Buffalo 6–0)

Second Quarter

- (14:56) BUFF – Upton Bellenfant 20 yard field goal (Drive: 8 plays, 55 yards, 1:46; Buffalo 9–0)

Third Quarter

- (12:01) BUFF – Al-Jay Henderson 45 yard run, Upton Bellenfant kick (Drive: 9 plays, 75 yards, 2:59; Buffalo 16–0)

Fourth Quarter

- (12:28) BUFF – Upton Bellenfant 45 yard field goal (Drive: 4 plays, 7 yards, 1:26; Buffalo 19–0)
- (12:09) BUFF – Red Murdock 31 yard interception return, Upton Bellenfant kick (Drive: 2 plays, 0 yards, 0:19; Buffalo 26–0)
- (7:00) LIB – Reese Smith 36 yard pass from Nate Hampton, Colin Karhu kick (Drive: 14 plays, 75 yards, 5:09; Buffalo 26–7)

Statistics	UB	LIB
First downs	18	11
Total yards	359	242
Rushing yards	222	162
Passing yards	137	80
Passing: Comp–Att–Int	9–19–0	6–21–1
Time of possession	37:01	22:59

Team	Category	Player	Statistics
Buffalo	Passing	C.J. Ogbonna	9/19, 137 yards
Buffalo	Rushing	Al-Jay Henderson	21 carries, 199 yards, TD
Buffalo	Receiving	Victor Snow	4 receptions, 41 yards
Liberty	Passing	Nate Hampton	2/9, 40 yards, TD, INT
Liberty	Rushing	Billy Lucas	3 carries, 57 yards
Liberty	Receiving	Reese Smith	1 reception, 36 yards, TD
