= 2024 Northern Illinois Huskies football team =

American college football season

2024 Northern Illinois Huskies football

Famous Idaho Potato Bowl champion

Famous Idaho Potato Bowl, W 28–20 ^{2OT} vs. Fresno State
- Conference: Mid-American Conference
- Record: 8–5 (4–4 MAC)
- Head coach: Thomas Hammock (6th season)
- Offensive coordinator: Wesley Beschorner (1st season)
- Offensive scheme: Spread
- Defensive coordinator: Nick Benedetto (3rd season)
- Base defense: 4–2–5
- Home stadium: Huskie Stadium

2024 Mid-American Conference football standings
	Conf.			Overall
Team	W		L	W		L
Ohio y$	7	–	1	11	–	3
Miami (OH) y	7	–	1	9	–	5
Buffalo	6	–	2	9	–	4
Bowling Green	6	–	2	7	–	6
Western Michigan	5	–	3	6	–	7
Toledo	4	–	4	8	–	5
Northern Illinois	4	–	4	8	–	5
Akron	3	–	5	4	–	8
Eastern Michigan	2	–	6	5	–	7
Central Michigan	2	–	6	4	–	8
Ball State	2	–	6	3	–	9
Kent State	0	–	8	0	–	12
Championship: Ohio 38, Miami (OH) 3
$ – Conference champion; y – Championship game participant

The 2024 Northern Illinois Huskies football team represented Northern Illinois University in the Mid-American Conference during the 2024 NCAA Division I FBS football season. The Huskies were led by Thomas Hammock in his sixth year as the head coach. The Huskies played home games at Huskie Stadium, located in DeKalb, Illinois.

On September 7, the Huskies notched their first-ever win over a top-10 ranked team, beating No. 5 Notre Dame 16–14 in South Bend, Indiana. As a result, the Huskies were ranked No. 25 in the AP poll released on September 9, the first time an NIU team had been ranked since December of 2013. This upset would become even more shocking as the year went on, as this would prove to be Notre Dame's only loss until the Fighting Irish lost to Ohio State in the national championship game on January 20, 2025. The Huskies meanwhile, were unable to significantly build on the win as they finished the season 8–5 overall, and 4–4 in MAC play.

== Preseason ==
=== Preseason poll ===
On July 19 the MAC announced the preseason coaches poll. Northern Illinois was picked to finish tied for third in the conference. The Huskies received zero votes to win the MAC Championship.

== Schedule ==
Date	Time	Opponent	Rank	Site	TV	Result	Attendance
August 31	2:30 p.m.	Western Illinois*		Huskie Stadium; DeKalb, IL	ESPN+	W 54–15	10,828
September 7	2:30 p.m.	at No. 5 Notre Dame*		Notre Dame Stadium; South Bend, IN	NBC	W 16–14	77,622
September 21	2:30 p.m.	Buffalo	No. 23	Huskie Stadium; DeKalb, IL	ESPN+	L 20–23 ^{OT}	18,688
September 28	11:00 a.m.	at NC State*		Carter–Finley Stadium; Raleigh, NC	The CW	L 17–24	56,919
October 5	11:00 a.m.	UMass*		Huskie Stadium; DeKalb, IL	CBSSN	W 34–20	12,466
October 12	2:30 p.m.	at Bowling Green		Doyt Perry Stadium; Bowling Green, OH	ESPN+	W 17–7	9,559
October 19	2:30 p.m.	Toledo^{†}		Huskie Stadium; DeKalb, IL	ESPN+	L 6–13	18,350
October 26	2:30 p.m.	at Ball State		Scheumann Stadium; Muncie, IN (Bronze Stalk Trophy)	ESPN+	L 23–25	15,318
November 6	6:00 p.m.	at Western Michigan		Waldo Stadium; Kalamazoo, MI	ESPN2	W 42–28	10,346
November 13	6:00 p.m.	Akron		Huskie Stadium; DeKalb, IL	CBSSN	W 29–16	6,795
November 19	8:00 p.m.	at Miami (OH)		Yager Stadium; Oxford, OH	ESPN	L 9–20	5,891
November 30	2:30 p.m.	Central Michigan		Huskie Stadium; DeKalb, IL	CBSSN	W 24–16	5,843
December 23	1:30 p.m.	vs. Fresno State		Albertsons Stadium; Boise, ID (Famous Idaho Potato Bowl)	ESPN	W 28–20 ^{2OT}	10,359
*Non-conference game; ^{†}Homecoming; Rankings from AP Poll and CFP Rankings released prior to game; All times are in Central time; Source:

== Rankings ==
Ranking movements Legend: ██ Increase in ranking ██ Decrease in ranking — = Not ranked RV = Received votes
	Week																
Poll	Pre	1	2	3	4	5	6	7	8	9	10	11	12	13	14	15	Final
AP	—	—	25	23	—	—	—	—	—	—	—	—	—	—	—	—	
Coaches	—	—	RV	RV	—	—	—	—	—	—	—	—	—	—	—	—	
CFP	Not released										—	—	—	—	—	—	Not released

== Game summaries ==
=== Western Illinois (FCS) ===
Western Illinois Leathernecks at Northern Illinois Huskies – Game summary

Quarter	1	2	3	4	Total
Leathernecks	3	0	5	7	15
Huskies	6	28	13	7	54

at Huskie Stadium, DeKalb, Illinois

- Date: August 31
- Game time: 2:30 p.m. CDT
- Game weather: Sunny, 81 °F (27 °C)
- Game attendance: 10,828
- Referee: Amanda Sauer
- TV announcers (ESPN+): Kelsie Kasper and Ryan Cavanaugh
- Box score, Recap

Game information
First quarter
- NIU – Dane Pardridge 23-yard pass from Ethan Hampton (kick failed), 12:21. Huskies 6–0. Drive: 2 plays, 46 yards, 0:25.
- WIU – Antonio Chadha 44-yard field goal, 0:51. Huskies 6–3. Drive: 11 plays, 61, yards, 4:35.

Second quarter

- NIU – Cam Thompson 11-yard pass from Ethan Hampton (Kanon Woodill kick), 12:36. Huskies 13–3. Drive: 8 plays, 75 yards, 3:15.
- NIU – Trayvon Rudolph 60-yard run (Kanon Woodill kick), 8:47. Huskies 20–3. Drive: 1 play, 60 yards, 0:08.
- NIU – Keyshaun Pipkin 11-yard pass from Ethan Hampton (Kanon Woodill kick), 1:55. Huskies 27–3. Drive: 9 plays, 68 yards, 5:05.
- NIU – Trayvon Rudolph 43-yard pass from Ethan Hampton (Kanon Woodill kick), 0:40. Huskies 34–3. Drive: 4 plays, 60 yards, 0:44.

Third quarter

- NIU – Grayson Barnes 60-yard pass from Ethan Hampton (Kanon Woodill kick), 13:28. Huskies 41–3. Drive: 3 plays, 75 yards, 1:32.
- NIU – Jaylen Poe 7-yard run (kick blocked), 4:22. Huskies 47–3. Drive: 14 plays, 88 yards, 7:06.
- WIU – Fredrik Greenhoward defensive PAT conversion, 4:22. Huskies 47–5.
- WIU – Antonio Chadha 46-yard field goal, 1:39. Huskies 47–8. Drive: 8 plays, 50 yards, 2:36.

Fourth quarter

- NIU – Jalen Macon 5-yard run (Kanon Woodill kick), 8:00. Huskies 54–8. Drive: 12 plays, 64 yards, 5:31.
- WIU – Torrance Farmer Jr. 27-yard pass from Nathan Lamb (Antonio Chadha kick), 2:59. Huskies 54–15. Drive: 9 plays, 81 yards, 4:56.

Statistics	WIU	NIU
First downs	17	30
Total yards	298	706
Rushing yards	94	312
Passing yards	204	394
Turnovers	0	1
Time of possession	28:26	31:34

Team	Category	Player	Statistics
Western Illinois	Passing	Nathan Lamb	17/29, 204 yards, TD
Western Illinois	Rushing	Cameren Smith	14 rushes, 51 yards
Western Illinois	Receiving	Tristin Duncan	5 receptions, 68 yards
Northern Illinois	Passing	Ethan Hampton	18/20, 328 yards, 5 TD
Northern Illinois	Rushing	Antario Brown	8 rushes, 69 yards
Northern Illinois	Receiving	Trayvon Rudolph	4 receptions, 104 yards, TD

=== At No. 5 Notre Dame ===
Northern Illinois Huskies at No. 5 Notre Dame Fighting Irish – Game summary

Quarter	1	2	3	4	Total
Huskies	10	3	0	3	16
No. 5 Fighting Irish	7	0	7	0	14

at Notre Dame Stadium, South Bend, Indiana

- Date: September 7
- Game time: 2:30 p.m. CDT/3:30 p.m. EDT
- Game weather: Sunny, 63 °F (17 °C)
- Game attendance: 77,622
- Referee: Tim Hedgepeth
- TV announcers (NBC): Dan Hicks, Jason Garrett, and Zora Stephenson
- Box score, Recap

Game information
First quarter
- ND – Riley Leonard 1-yard run (Mitch Jeter kick), 8:28. Fighting Irish 7–0. Drive: 13 plays, 75 yards, 6:25.
- NIU – Antario Brown 83-yard pass from Ethan Hampton (Kanon Woodill kick), 5:35. Tied 7–7. Drive: 5 plays, 98 yards, 2:51.
- NIU – Kanon Woodill 42-yard field goal, 2:13. Huskies 10–7. Drive: 5 plays, 30 yards, 1:27.

Second quarter

- NIU – Kanon Woodill 21-yard field goal, 13:39. Huskies 13–7. Drive: 5 plays, 51 yards, 2:08.

Third quarter

- ND – Jeremiyah Love 34-yard run (Mitch Jeter kick), 8:34. Fighting Irish 14–13. Drive: 6 plays, 64 yards, 2:43.

Fourth quarter

- NIU – Kanon Woodill 35-yard field goal, 0:31. Huskies 16–14. Drive: 11 plays, 31 yards, 5:24.

Statistics	NIU	ND
First downs	16	17
Total yards	388	286
Rushing yards	190	123
Passing yards	198	163
Turnovers	0	2
Time of possession	34:38	25:22

Team	Category	Player	Statistics
Northern Illinois	Passing	Ethan Hampton	10/19, 198 yards, TD
Northern Illinois	Rushing	Antario Brown	20 rushes, 99 yards
Northern Illinois	Receiving	Antario Brown	2 receptions, 126 yards, TD
Notre Dame	Passing	Riley Leonard	20/32, 163 yards, 2 INT
Notre Dame	Rushing	Jeremiyah Love	11 rushes, 79 yards, TD
Notre Dame	Receiving	Beaux Collins	5 receptions, 45 yards

This was the Huskies' first win over an AP top-10 team in program history.

=== Buffalo ===
Buffalo Bulls at No. 23 Northern Illinois Huskies – Game summary

Quarter	1	2	3	4	OT	Total
Bulls	0	3	7	10	3	23
No. 23 Huskies	7	7	0	6	0	20

at Huskie Stadium, DeKalb, Illinois

- Date: September 21
- Game time: 2:30 p.m. CDT
- Game weather: Sunny • Temperature: 88 °F (31 °C) • Wind: N 9 mph
- Game attendance: 18,688
- Referee: David Siegle
- TV announcers (ESPN+): Jason Ross Jr. and Tyoka Jackson
- Box score, Recap

Game information

First quarter

- (5:14) NIU – Antario Brown 5-yard run, Kanon Woodill kick (Drive: 13 plays, 66 yards, 6:36; Northern Illinois 7-0)

Second quarter

- (7:18) BUF – Upton Bellenfant 42-yard field goal (Drive: 11 plays, 54 yards, 5:26; Northern Illinois 7-3)
- (1:55) NIU – Antario Brown 14-yard run, Kanon Woodill kick (Drive: 2 plays, 36 yards, 0:16; Northern Illinois 14-3)

Third quarter

- (10:59) BUF – Victor Snow 46-yard pass from C. J. Ogbonna, Upton Bellenfant kick (Drive: 6 plays, 59 yards, 2:32; Northern Illinois 14-10)

Fourth quarter

- (14:51) NIU – Kanon Woodill 30-yard field goal (Drive: 11 plays, 57 yards, 5:44; Northern Illinois 17-10)
- (12:02) BUF – Al-Jay Henderson 36-yard run, Upton Bellenfant kick (Drive: 7 plays, 75 yards, 2:49; Tied 17-17)
- (3:28) BUF – Upton Bellenfant 42-yard field goal (Drive: 4 plays, -4 yards, 2:11; Buffalo 20-17)
- (0:24) NIU – Kanon Woodill 27-yard field goal (Drive: 13 plays, 66 yards, 3:04; Tied 20-20)

Overtime

- (0:00) BUF – Upton Bellenfant 37-yard field goal (Drive: 4 plays, 6 yards, 0:00; Buffalo 23-20)

Statistics	UB	NIU
First downs	9	24
Total yards	184	359
Rushing yards	77	165
Passing yards	107	194
Turnovers	1	2
Time of possession	23:47	36:13

Team	Category	Player	Statistics
Buffalo	Passing	C. J. Ogbonna	10/17, 107 yards, TD
Buffalo	Rushing	Al-Jay Henderson	11 carries, 56 yards, TD
Buffalo	Receiving	Victor Snow	3 receptions, 72 yards, TD
Northern Illinois	Passing	Ethan Hampton	23/43, 194 yards, INT
Northern Illinois	Rushing	Antario Brown	24 carries, 73 yards, 2 TD
Northern Illinois	Receiving	Cam Thompson	3 receptions, 49 yards

=== At NC State ===
Northern Illinois Huskies at NC State Wolfpack – Game summary

Quarter	1	2	3	4	Total
Huskies	7	7	0	3	17
Wolfpack	7	10	7	0	24

at Carter–Finley Stadium, Raleigh, North Carolina

- Date: September 28
- Game time: 11:00 a.m. CDT/12:00 p.m. EDT
- Game weather: Sunny, 79 °F (26 °C)
- Game attendance: 56,919
- Referee: Justin Elliot
- TV announcers (The CW): Thom Brennaman (play-by-play), Max Browne (analyst) and Carla Gebhart (sideline)
- Box score, Recap

Game information
First quarter
- NCSU – CJ Bailey 1-yard run (Kanoah Vinesett kick), 6:15. Wolfpack 7–0. Drive: 8 plays, 64 yards, 5:02.
- NIU – Brock Lampe 0-yard run (Kanon Woodill kick), 2:23. Tied 7–7. Drive: 7 plays, 75 yards, 3:52.

Second quarter

- NCSU – DK Kaufman 2-yard fumble return (Kanoah Vinesett kick), 14:09. Wolfpack 14–7. Drive: 3 plays, -10 yards, 1:07.
- NCSU – Kanoah Vinesett 37-yard field goal, 4:55. Wolfpack 17–7. Drive: 5 plays, 36 yards, 2:43.
- NIU – Cam Thompson 6-yard pass from Ethan Hampton (Kanon Woodill kick), 1:45. Wolfpack 17–14. Drive: 9 plays, 75 yards, 3:10.

Third quarter

- NCSU – Kevin Concepcion 3-yard pass from CJ Bailey (Kanoah Vinesett kick), 11:46. Wolfpack 24–14. Drive: 3 plays, 1 yard, 1:33.

Fourth quarter

- NIU – Kanon Woodill 50-yard field goal, 14:46. Wolfpack 24–17. Drive: 14 plays, 48 yards, 6:01.

Statistics	NIU	NCST
First downs	20	11
Total yards	279	171
Rushing yards	120	62
Passing yards	159	109
Turnovers	4	0
Time of possession	32:41	27:19

Team	Category	Player	Statistics
Northern Illinois	Passing	Ethan Hampton	14/29, 159 yards, TD, 2 INT
Northern Illinois	Rushing	Antario Brown	28 carries, 114 yards
Northern Illinois	Receiving	Andrew McElroy	3 receptions, 58 yards
NC State	Passing	CJ Bailey	13/20, 109 yards, TD
NC State	Rushing	CJ Bailey	10 carries, 22 yards, TD
NC State	Receiving	Noah Rogers	2 receptions, 48 yards

=== UMass ===
UMass Minutemen at Northern Illinois Huskies – Game summary

Quarter	1	2	3	4	Total
Minutemen	7	6	0	7	20
Huskies	7	0	6	21	34

at Huskie Stadium, DeKalb, Illinois

- Date: October 5
- Game time: 11:00 a.m. CDT/12:00 p.m. EDT
- Game weather: Sunny • Temperature: 68 °F (20 °C) • Wind: NW at 12 miles per hour (19 km/h)
- Game attendance: 12,466
- Referee: Matt Packowski
- TV announcers (CBSSN): Carter Blackburn (play-by-play) and Luke Kuechly (analyst)
- Box score, Recap

Game information
First quarter
- NIU – Brock Lampe 15-yard pass from Ethan Hampton (Kanon Woodill kick), 14:10. Huskies 7–0. Drive: 1 play, 15 yards, 0:06.
- MASS – T.Y. Harding 58-yard pass from Taisun Phommachanh (Jacob Lurie kick), 11:56. Tied 7–7. Drive: 4 plays, 75 yards, 2:14.

Second quarter

- MASS – Jacob Lurie 27-yard field goal, 12:33. Minutemen 10–7. Drive: 12 plays, 71 yards, 5:37.
- MASS – Jacob Lurie 27-yard field goal, 0:06. Minutemen 13–7. Drive: 10 plays, 46 yards, 3:19.

Third quarter

- NIU – Jaylen Poe 22-yard run (PAT missed), 11:23. Tied 13–13. Drive: 7 plays, 75 yards, 3:37.

Fourth quarter

- NIU – Jaylen Poe 3-yard run (Kanon Woodill kick), 14:12. Huskies 20–13. Drive: 13 plays, 75 yards, 7:06.
- NIU – Gavin Williams 1-yard run (Kanon Woodill kick), 5:29. Huskies 27–13. Drive: 9 plays, 90 yards, 5:22.
- MASS – T.Y. Harding 16-yard pass from Taisun Phommachanh (Jacob Lurie kick), 3:16. Huskies 27–20. Drive: 8 plays, 75 yards, 2:13.
- NIU – Ethan Hampton 1-yard run (Kanon Woodill kick), 2:05. Huskies 34–20. Drive: 3 plays, 4 yards, 0:57.

Statistics	MASS	NIU
First downs	19	23
Total yards	378	402
Rushing yards	115	367
Passing yards	263	35
Turnovers	1	2
Time of possession	26:20	33:40

Team	Category	Player	Statistics
UMass	Passing	Taisun Phommachanh	15/30, 263 yards, 2 TD
UMass	Rushing	CJ Hester	15 carries, 71 yards
UMass	Receiving	T.Y. Harding	5 receptions, 116 yards, 2 TD
Northern Illinois	Passing	Ethan Hampton	5/9, 34 yards, TD, INT
Northern Illinois	Rushing	Gavin Wiliams	19 carries, 125 yards, TD
Northern Illinois	Receiving	Brock Lampe	1 reception, 15 yards, TD

=== At Bowling Green ===
Northern Illinois Huskies at Bowling Green Falcons – Game summary

Quarter	1	2	3	4	Total
Huskies	3	3	0	11	17
Falcons	7	0	0	0	7

at Doyt Perry Stadium, Bowling Green, Ohio

- Date: October 12
- Game time: 2:30 p.m. CDT/3:30 p.m. EDT
- Game weather: Cloudy • Temperature: 70 °F (21 °C) • Wind: NE at 8 miles per hour (13 km/h)
- Game attendance: 9,559
- Referee: Billy Williams
- TV announcers (ESPN+): Jason Ross Jr. (play-by-play) and Tyoka Jackson (analyst)
- Box score, Recap

Game information

First quarter

- (8:58) NIU – Kanon Woodill 46-yard field goal (Drive: 10 plays, 46 yards, 6:02; NIU 3–0)
- (6:55) BGSU – Harold Fannin Jr. 11-yard pass from Connor Bazelak, Jackson Kleather kick (Drive: 5 plays, 75 yards, 2:03; BGSU 7–3)

Second quarter

- (1:40) NIU – Kanon Woodill 21-yard field goal (Drive: 13 plays, 54 yards, 4:18; BGSU 7–6)

Third quarter

No scoring plays

Fourth quarter

- (14:53) NIU – Josh Holst 22-yard run, Isaac Hatfield Two-point pass (Drive: 7 plays, 46 yards, 3:46; NIU 14–7)
- (6:00) NIU – Kanon Woodill 27-yard field goal (Drive: 12 plays, 59 yards, 5:43; NIU 17–7)

Statistics	NIU	BGSU
First downs	19	15
Total yards	278	205
Rushing yards	170	107
Passing yards	108	98
Turnovers	0	2
Time of possession	34:44	25:16

Team	Category	Player	Statistics
Northern Illinois	Passing	Josh Holst	10/14, 89 yards
Northern Illinois	Rushing	Gavin Williams	29 carries, 102 yards
Northern Illinois	Receiving	Andrew McElroy	5 receptions, 47 yards
Bowling Green	Passing	Connor Bazelak	8/14, 88 yards, TD
Bowling Green	Rushing	Terion Stewart	13 carries, 64 yards
Bowling Green	Receiving	Jamal Johnson	3 receptions, 43 yards

=== Toledo ===
Toledo Rockets at Northern Illinois Huskies – Game summary

Quarter	1	2	3	4	Total
Rockets	0	7	3	3	13
Huskies	3	3	0	0	6

at Huskie Stadium, DeKalb, Illinois

- Date: October 19
- Game time: 2:30 p.m. CDT/3:30 p.m. EDT
- Game weather: Sunny • Temperature: 72 °F (22 °C) • Wind: N 9 miles per hour (14 km/h)
- Game attendance: 18,350
- Referee: Rich Edwards
- TV announcers (ESPN+): Mike Couzens (play-by-play) and Ryan Cavanaugh (analyst)
- Box score, Recap

Game information

First quarter

- (11:43) NIU FG: Kanon Woodill 36-yard field goal NIU 3–0; 9 plays, 56 yards, 3:17

Second quarter

- (08:08) TOL TD: Jerjuan Newton 52-yard pass from John Richter (Dylan Cunanan kick) TOL 7–3; 2 plays, 61 yards, 00:40
- (00:00) NIU FG: Kanon Woodill 37-yard field goal TOL 7–6; 9 plays, 60 yards, 1:16

Third quarter

- (02:22) TOL FG: Dylan Cunanan 22-yard field goal TOL 10–6; 12 plays, 88 yards, 4:39

Fourth quarter

- (11:12) TOL FG: Dylan Cunanan 27-yard field goal TOL 13–6; 10 plays, 56 yards, 3:58

Statistics	TOL	NIU
First downs	15	25
Total yards	285	391
Rushing yards	133	181
Passing yards	152	210
Turnovers	0	0
Time of possession	23:46	36:14

Team	Category	Player	Statistics
Toledo	Passing	John Richter	15/28, 152 yards, TD
Toledo	Rushing	Connor Walendzak	19 carries, 78 yards
Toledo	Receiving	Jerjuan Newton	3 receptions, 64 yards, TD
Northern Illinois	Passing	Josh Holst	22/46, 210 yards
Northern Illinois	Rushing	Gavin Williams	16 carries, 78 yards
Northern Illinois	Receiving	Cam Thompson	5 receptions, 80 yards

=== at Ball State (Bronze Stalk Trophy) ===
Northern Illinois Huskies at Ball State Cardinals – Game summary

Quarter	1	2	3	4	Total
Huskies	7	7	0	9	23
Cardinals	7	12	0	6	25

at Scheumann Stadium, Muncie, Indiana

- Date: October 26
- Game time: 2:30 p.m. CDT/3:30 p.m. EDT
- Game weather: Sunny • Temperature: 58 °F (14 °C) • Wind: N at 10 miles per hour (16 km/h)
- Game attendance: 15,318
- Referee: David Siegle
- TV announcers (ESPN+): Kelsie Kaspar (play-by-play) and Marcus Ray (analyst)
- Box score, Recap

Game information
First quarter
- BALL – Tanner Koziol 3-yard pass from Kadin Semonza (Jackson Courville kick), 10:26. Cardinals 7–0. Drive: 10 plays, 62 yards, 4:27.
- NIU – Antario Brown 34-yard run (Kanon Woodill kick), 2:23. Tied 7–7. Drive: 7 plays, 90 yards, 4:08.

Second quarter

- BALL – Jackson Courville 24-yard field goal, 12:44. Cardinals 10–7. Drive: 7 plays, 68 yards, 3:05.
- BALL – Jackson Courville 47-yard field goal, 9:40. Cardinals 13–7. Drive: 4 plays, 2 yards, 1:30.
- BALL – Tanner Koziol 6-yard pass from Kadin Semonza (PAT missed), 1:51. Cardinals 19–7. Drive: 12 plays, 63 yards, 4:45.
- NIU – Cam Thompson 54-yard pass from Ethan Hampton (Kanon Woodill kick), 1:12. Cardinals 19–14. Drive: 6 plays, 75 yards, 0:39.

Third quarter

- No scoring plays

Fourth quarter

- BALL – Jackson Courville 50-yard field goal, 8:52. Cardinals 22–14. Drive: 10 plays, 22 yards, 4:33.
- NIU – Antario Brown 6-yard run (2-point conversion failed), 4:57. Cardinals 22–20. Drive: 10 plays, 75 yards, 3:54.
- NIU – Kanon Woodill 47-yard field goal, 0:15. Huskies 23–22. Drive: 12 plays, 50 yards, 1:36.
- BALL – Jackson Courville 52-yard field goal, 0:02. Cardinals 25–23. Drive: 3 plays, 39 yards, 0:11.

Statistics	NIU	BALL
First downs	22	21
Total yards	374	392
Rushing yards	142	170
Passing yards	232	222
Turnovers	4	0
Time of possession	25:08	34:52

Team	Category	Player	Statistics
Northern Illinois	Passing	Ethan Hampton	18/33, 168 yards, TD, INT
Northern Illinois	Rushing	Antario Brown	11 carries, 62 yards, 2 TD
Northern Illinois	Receiving	Cam Thompson	8 receptions, 128 yards, TD
Ball State	Passing	Kadin Semonza	20/33, 211 yards, 2 TD
Ball State	Rushing	Vaughn Pemberton	14 carries, 69 yards
Ball State	Receiving	Tanner Koziol	9 receptions, 78 yards, 2 TD

=== at Western Michigan ===
Northern Illinois Huskies at Western Michigan Broncos – Game summary

Quarter	1	2	3	4	Total
Huskies	0	21	21	0	42
Broncos	7	7	7	7	28

at Waldo Stadium, Kalamazoo, Michigan

- Date: November 6
- Game time: 6:00 p.m. CDT/7:00 p.m. EDT
- TV announcers (ESPN2): Lowell Galindo (play-by-play) and Fozzy Whittaker (analyst)
- Box score, Recap

Game information
First quarter
- WMU – Jaden Nixon 66-yard run (Luka Zurak kick), 9:18. Broncos 7–0. Drive: 2 plays, 65 yards, 0:47.

Second quarter

- NIU – Telly Johnson Jr. 6-yard run (Kanon Woodill kick), 13:56. Tied 7–7. Drive: 5 plays, 31 yards, 2:04.
- NIU – Tristen Tewes 7-yard pass from Ethan Hampton (Kanon Woodill kick), 6:05. Huskies 14–7. Drive: 8 plays, 86 yards, 4:30.
- WMU – Jaden Nixon 14-yard run (Luka Zurak kick), 1:54. Tied 14–14. Drive: 9 plays, 75 yards, 4:11.
- NIU – Gavin Williams 5-yard pass from Ethan Hampton (Kanon Woodill kick), 0:09. Huskies 21–14. Drive: 12 plays, 60 yards, 1:45.

Third quarter

- WMU – Broc Lowry 1-yard run (Luka Zurak kick), 12:33. Tied 21–21. Drive: 4 plays, 38 yards, 2:14.
- NIU – Cam Thompson 91-yard kickoff return (Kanon Woodill kick), 12:33. Huskies 28–21. Drive: 4 plays, 38 yards, 2:14.
- NIU – Gavin Williams 2-yard run (Kanon Woodill kick), 8:19. Huskies 35–21. Drive: 6 plays, 35 yards, 3:24.
- NIU – Telly Johnson Jr. 26-yard run (Kanon Woodill kick), 0:47. Huskies 42–21. Drive: 5 plays, 71 yards, 2:49.

Fourth quarter

- WMU – Mareyohn Hrabowski 10-yard pass from Hayden Wolff (Luka Zurak kick), 11:49. Huskies 42–28. Drive: 9 plays, 60 yards, 3:58.

Statistics	NIU	WMU
First downs	21	21
Total yards	411	390
Rushing yards	255	211
Passing yards	156	179
Turnovers	1	3
Time of possession	29:24	30:36

Team	Category	Player	Statistics
Northern Illinois	Passing	Ethan Hampton	13/16, 156 yards, 2 TD
Northern Illinois	Rushing	Telly Johnson Jr.	23 carries, 141 yards, 2 TD
Northern Illinois	Receiving	Trayvon Rudolph	6 receptions, 74 yards
Western Michigan	Passing	Hayden Wolff	14/27, 179 yards, TD, 2 INT
Western Michigan	Rushing	Jaden Nixon	12 carries, 95 yards, 2 TD
Western Michigan	Receiving	Kenneth Womack	4 receptions, 51 yards

=== Akron ===
Akron Zips at Northern Illinois Huskies – Game summary

Quarter	1	2	3	4	Total
Zips	6	10	0	0	16
Huskies	17	6	0	6	29

at Huskie Stadium, DeKalb, Illinois

- Date: November 13
- Game time: 6:00 p.m. CDT/7:00 p.m. EDT
- TV announcers (CBSSN): Jason Knapp (play-by-play) and Brock Vereen (analyst)
- Box score, Recap

Game information
First quarter
- NIU – Kanon Woodill 32-yard field goal, 12:31. Huskies 3–0. Drive: 4 plays, 6 yards, 1:34.
- AKR – Adrian Norton 40-yard pass from Ben Finley (2-point conversion failed), 9:46. Zips 6–3. Drive: 7 plays, 68 yards, 2:38.
- NIU – Trayvon Rudolph 58-yard run (Kanon Woodill kick), 8:20. Huskies 10–6. Drive: 3 plays, 70 yards, 1:21.
- NIU – Dane Pardridge 39-yard pass from Trayvon Rudolph (Kanon Woodill kick), 3:50. Huskies 17–6. Drive: 4 plays, 55 yards, 2:21.

Second quarter

- AKR – Garrison Smith 27-yard field goal, 10:56. Huskies 17–9. Drive: 11 plays, 78 yards, 4:33.
- AKR – Terence Thomas 0-yard blocked punt return (Garrison Smith kick), 9:20. Huskies 17–16. Drive: 3 plays, 3 yards, 1:36.
- NIU – Grayson Barnes 32-yard pass from Ethan Hampton (2-point conversion failed), 5:32. Huskies 23–16. Drive: 7 plays, 82 yards, 3:42.

Third quarter

- No scoring plays

Fourth quarter

- NIU – Gavin Williams 71-yard run (2-point conversion failed), 7:56. Huskies 29–16. Drive: 1 plays, 71 yards, 0:09.

Statistics	AKR	NIU
First downs	19	14
Total yards	255	439
Rushing yards	50	295
Passing yards	205	144
Turnovers	1	0
Time of possession	26:31	33:29

Team	Category	Player	Statistics
Akron	Passing	Ben Finley	19/52, 205 yards, TD
Akron	Rushing	Jordon Simmons	12 carries, 56 yards
Akron	Receiving	Adrian Norton	2 receptions, 57 yards, TD
Northern Illinois	Passing	Ethan Hampton	9/16, 105 yards, TD
Northern Illinois	Rushing	Telly Johnson Jr.	21 carries, 104 yards
Northern Illinois	Receiving	Dane Pardridge	1 reception, 39 yards, TD

=== at Miami (OH) ===
Northern Illinois Huskies at Miami RedHawks – Game summary

Quarter	1	2	3	4	Total
Huskies	0	3	0	6	9
RedHawks	7	10	0	3	20

at Yager Stadium, Oxford, Ohio

- Date: November 19
- Game time: 7:00 p.m. CDT/8:00 p.m. EDT
- Game weather: Fog • Temperature: 55 °F (13 °C) • Wind: NW 1 mile per hour (1.6 km/h)
- Game attendance: 5,891
- Referee: William Williams
- TV announcers (ESPN): Matt Schumacker (play-by-play) and Dustin Fox (analyst)
- Box score, Recap

Game information

First quarter

- (2:31) MIA – Dylan Downing 2-yard run, Dom Dzioban kick (Drive: 5 plays, 69 yards, 3:05; Miami (OH) 7–0)

Second quarter

- (12:24) MIA – Dom Dzioban 22-yard field goal (Drive: 7 plays, 73 yards, 2:22; Miami (OH) 10–0)
- (3:50) MIA – Reggie Virgil 30-yard pass from Javon Tracy, Dom Dzioban kick (Drive: 6 plays, 87 yards, 3:01; Miami (OH) 17–0)
- (0:04) NIU – Kanon Woodill 47-yard field goal (Drive: 4 plays, 1 yard, 1:41; Miami (OH) 17–3)

Third quarter

No scoring plays

Fourth quarter

- (11:51) NIU – Telly Johnson Jr. 2-yard run (Drive: 9 plays, 61 yards, 4:07; Miami (OH) 17–9)
- (2:25) MIA – Dom Dzioban 27-yard field goal (Drive: 7 plays, 16 yards, 3:21; Miami (OH) 20–9)

Statistics	NIU	M-OH
First downs	19	17
Total yards	242	324
Rushing yards	128	87
Passing yards	114	237
Turnovers	2	1
Time of possession	32:56	27:04

Team	Category	Player	Statistics
Northern Illinois	Passing	Ethan Hampton	10/25, 70 yards, INT
Northern Illinois	Rushing	Telly Johnson Jr.	15 carries, 47 yards, TD
Northern Illinois	Receiving	Andrew McElroy	5 receptions, 38 yards
Miami (OH)	Passing	Brett Gabbert	14/23, 207 yards, INT
Miami (OH)	Rushing	Keyon Mozee	14 carries, 91 yards
Miami (OH)	Receiving	Reggie Virgil	4 receptions, 107 yards, TD

=== Central Michigan ===
Central Michigan Chippewas at Northern Illinois Huskies – Game summary

Quarter	1	2	3	4	Total
Chippewas	0	16	0	0	16
Huskies	19	2	3	0	24

at Huskie Stadium, DeKalb, Illinois

- Date: November 30
- Game time: 2:30 p.m. CDT/3:30 p.m. EDT
- TV announcers (CBSSN): TBD
- Box score, Recap

Game information
First quarter
- NIU – Gavin Williams 24-yard run (2-point conversion pass failed), 10:42. Huskies 6–0. Drive: 6 plays, 66 yards, 2:47.
- NIU – Ethan Hampton 16-yard run (PAT failed), 6:55. Huskies 12–0. Drive: 5 plays, 36 yards, 2:11.
- NIU – Telly Johnson Jr. 4-yard run (Kanon Woodill kick), 2:23. Huskies 19–0. Drive: 4 plays, 66 yards, 2:24.

Second quarter

- CMU – Jesse Prewitt III 3-yard pass from Jadyn Glasser (PAT blocked), 13:44. Huskies 19–6. Drive: 7 plays, 72 yards, 3:34.
- NIU – JaVaughn Byrd defensive PAT conversion, 13:44. Huskies 21–6. Drive: 7 plays, 72 yards, 3:34.
- CMU – Tristan Mattson 40-yard field goal, 6:24. Huskies 21–9. Drive: 10 plays, 34 yards, 5:10.
- CMU – Jesse Prewitt III 6-yard pass from Jadyn Glasser (Tristan Mattson kick), 1:56. Huskies 21–16. Drive: 7 plays, 35 yards, 2:59.

Third quarter

- NIU – Kanon Woodill 26-yard field goal, 6:13. Huskies 24–16. Drive: 17 plays, 66 yards, 8:47.

Fourth quarter

- No scoring plays

Statistics	CMU	NIU
First downs	15	22
Total yards	204	332
Rushing yards	112	163
Passing yards	92	169
Turnovers	2	0
Time of possession	26:23	33:37

Team	Category	Player	Statistics
Central Michigan	Passing	Jadyn Glasser	12/25, 92 yards, 2 TD, INT
Central Michigan	Rushing	Marion Lukes	13 carries, 78 yards
Central Michigan	Receiving	Jesse Prewitt III	5 receptions, 37 yards, 2 TD
Northern Illinois	Passing	Ethan Hampton	19/30, 169 yards
Northern Illinois	Rushing	Telly Johnson Jr.	20 carries, 84 yards, TD
Northern Illinois	Receiving	Trayvon Rudolph	9 receptions, 97 yards

=== Fresno State (Famous Idaho Potato Bowl) ===
2024 Famous Idaho Potato Bowl
Northern Illinois Huskies (7-5, 4-4) at Fresno State Bulldogs (6-6, 4-3)

Quarter	1	2	3	4	OT	2OT	Total
Huskies	3	0	10	0	7	8	28
Bulldogs	13	0	0	0	7	0	20

at Albertsons Stadium, Boise, Idaho

- Date: December 23rd, 2024
- Game time: 1:30 p.m. CST/11:30 a.m. PST
- TV announcers (ESPN): Lowell Galindo, Fozzy Whittaker and Tori Petry
- Box score, Recap

Game information

First Quarter

- (11:29) FRES – Bryson Donelson 1 yard run, two-point pass conversion failed (Drive: 3 plays, 25 yards, 0:58; Fresno State 6–0)
- (2:45) NIU – Fresno State 26 yard field goal (Drive: 16 plays, 63 yards, 8:44; Fresno State 6–3)
- (1:08) FRES – Joshua Wood 13 yard run, Dylan Lynch kick (Drive: 4 plays, 90 yards, 1:37; Fresno State 13–3)

Second Quarter

- No scoring.

Third Quarter

- (11:22) NIU – Grayson Barnes 26 yard pass from Josh Holst, Kanon Woodill kick (Drive: 7 plays, 76 yards, 3:38; Fresno State 13–10)
- (7:39) NIU – Kanon Woodill 34 yard field goal (Drive: 5 plays, 34 yards, 2:11; Tied 13–13)

Fourth Quarter

- No scoring.

Overtime

- FRES – Bryson Donelson 9 yard pass from Joshua Wood, Dylan Lynch kick (Drive: 3 plays, 25 yards; Fresno State 20–13)
- NIU – Grayson Barnes 3 yard pass from Josh Holst, Kanon Woodill kick (Drive: 5 plays, 25 yards; Tied 20–20)

Second Overtime

- NIU – Dane Pardridge 25 yard pass from George Dimopoulos, George Dimopoulos two-point pass conversion from Josh Holst (Drive: 1 plays, 25 yards; Northern Illinois 28–20)

Statistics	NIU	FRES
First downs	24	17
Total yards	368	328
Rushing yards	161	117
Passing yards	207	211
Passing: Comp–Att–Int	19-31-1	19-29-1
Time of possession	39:14	20:46

Team	Category	Player	Statistics
Northern Illinois	Passing	Josh Holst	18/30, 182 yards, 2 TD, INT
Northern Illinois	Rushing	Josh Holst	16 carries, 65 yards
Northern Illinois	Receiving	Dane Pardridge	3 receptions, 59 yards, TD
Fresno State	Passing	Joshua Wood	16/23, 180 yards, TD
Fresno State	Rushing	Bryson Donelson	15 carries, 82 yards
Fresno State	Receiving	Mac Dalena	6 receptions, 118 yards
