= Ethan Hampton =

American football player (born 2003)

No. 5 – Southern Miss Golden Eagles
- Position: Quarterback
- Class: Graduate Student

Personal information
- Born: May 15, 2003 (age 23); Geneva, Illinois, U.S.
- Listed height: 6 ft 3 in (1.91 m)
- Listed weight: 220 lb (100 kg)

Career information
- High school: Aurora Christian (Aurora, Illinois)
- College: Northern Illinois (2021–2024); Illinois (2025); Southern Miss (2026–present)
- Stats at ESPN

Ethan Hampton (born May 15, 2003) is an American college football quarterback for the Southern Miss Golden Eagles. He previously played for the Northern Illinois Huskies and Illinois Fighting Illini.

== Early life ==
Hampton attended Aurora Christian Schools in Aurora, Illinois. As a sophomore, he threw for 2,457 yards and 31 touchdowns along with 13 interceptions. As a junior Hampton threw for 2,130 yards and 28 touchdowns with just five interceptions. Coming out of high school, Hampton was rated as a three-star recruit and committed to play college football for the Northern Illinois Huskies.

== College career ==
=== Northern Illinois ===
In his first three seasons at Northern Illinois, Hampton appeared in 11 games while making four starts for the Huskies where he completed 95 of his 165 passes for 968 yards and nine touchdowns with eight interceptions. In the 2024 season opener, he earned the Huskies starting job where he completed 18 of 20 pass attempts for 328 yards and five touchdowns in a win over Western Illinois, earning MAC offensive player of the week honors. In week 2, Hampton completed 10 of 19 passing attempts for 198 yards and a touchdown in an upset win over #5 Notre Dame. On December 1, 2024, Hampton entered the transfer portal.

On December 14, 2024, Hampton transferred to Wake Forest. He decommitted the next day.

=== Illinois ===
On December 19, 2024, Hampton transferred to Illinois.

=== Statistics ===
Year	Team	Games			Passing								Rushing			
Year	Team	GP	GS	Record	Cmp	Att	Pct	Yds	Y/A	TD	Int	Rtg	Att	Yds	Avg	TD
2021	Northern Illinois	3	1	0–1	4	10	40.0	23	2.3	0	0	59.3	5	−10	−2.0	0
2022	Northern Illinois	4	3	0–3	72	122	59.0	798	6.5	7	6	123.1	12	−6	−0.5	0
2023	Northern Illinois	5	0	—	19	33	57.6	147	4.5	2	2	102.9	4	6	1.5	0
2024	Northern Illinois	11	10	7–3	144	247	58.3	1,600	6.5	12	6	123.9	53	129	2.4	2
2025	Illinois	4	0	—	3	4	75.0	27	6.5	0	1	81.7	0	0	0.0	0
2026	Southern Miss	3	3	1–2	45	75	60.0	419	5.6	2	4	105.2	8	13	1.6	0
Career		29	17	8−9	287	491	58.5	3,014	6.1	23	19	117.7	82	132	1.6	2
