= 2024 Ball State Cardinals football team =

American college football season

2024 Ball State Cardinals football
- Conference: Mid-American Conference
- Record: 3–9 (2–6 MAC)
- Head coach: Mike Neu (9th season; first 10 games); Colin Johnson (interim; final 2 games)
- Offensive coordinator: Jared Elliott (2nd season)
- Offensive scheme: Multiple
- Defensive coordinator: Jeff Knowles (1st season)
- Base defense: 3–4
- Home stadium: Scheumann Stadium

2024 Mid-American Conference football standings
	Conf.			Overall
Team	W		L	W		L
Ohio y$	7	–	1	11	–	3
Miami (OH) y	7	–	1	9	–	5
Buffalo	6	–	2	9	–	4
Bowling Green	6	–	2	7	–	6
Western Michigan	5	–	3	6	–	7
Toledo	4	–	4	8	–	5
Northern Illinois	4	–	4	8	–	5
Akron	3	–	5	4	–	8
Eastern Michigan	2	–	6	5	–	7
Central Michigan	2	–	6	4	–	8
Ball State	2	–	6	3	–	9
Kent State	0	–	8	0	–	12
Championship: Ohio 38, Miami (OH) 3
$ – Conference champion; y – Championship game participant

The 2024 Ball State Cardinals football team represented Ball State University as a member of the Mid-American Conference during the 2024 NCAA Division I FBS football season. The Cardinals played home games at Scheumann Stadium, located in Muncie, Indiana.

After starting 3–7, ensuring a fourth straight losing season, ninth-year head coach Mike Neu was fired on November 16, 2024. Offensive line coach Colin Johnson was named interim head coach for the remainder of the season.

== Preseason ==
=== Preseason poll ===
On July 19 the MAC announced the preseason coaches poll. Ball State was picked to finish ninth in the conference. The Cardinals received zero votes to win the MAC Championship.

== Schedule ==
Unusually, Ball State did not play a game on "Week 1" of the season; they were the only idle FBS team on the traditional start of the season. Army, their original Week 1 opponent, dropped out after joining the American Athletic Conference. Ball State replaced Army with an October 19 game against Vanderbilt.

Date	Time	Opponent	Site	TV	Result	Attendance
September 7	2:00 p.m.	Missouri State*	Scheumann Stadium; Muncie, IN	ESPN+	W 42–34	10,018
September 14	3:30 p.m.	at No. 10 Miami (FL)*	Hard Rock Stadium; Miami Gardens, FL	ACCN	L 0–62	51,564
September 21	1:00 p.m.	at Central Michigan	Kelly/Shorts Stadium; Mount Pleasant, MI	ESPN+	L 34–37	18,011
September 28	1:30 p.m.	at James Madison*	Bridgeforth Stadium; Harrisonburg, VA	ESPN+	L 7–63	25,786
October 5	2:00 p.m.	Western Michigan	Scheumann Stadium; Muncie, IN	ESPN+	L 42–45	10,342
October 12	12:00 p.m.	at Kent State	Dix Stadium; Kent, OH	ESPN+	W 37–35	7,322
October 19	7:00 p.m.	at Vanderbilt*	FirstBank Stadium; Nashville, TN	SECN+/ESPN+	L 14–24	27,884
October 26	3:30 p.m.	Northern Illinois^{†}	Scheumann Stadium; Muncie, IN (Bronze Stalk Trophy)	ESPN+	W 25–23	15,318
November 5	8:00 p.m.	Miami (OH)	Scheumann Stadium; Muncie, IN	ESPN	L 21–27	6,412
November 12	7:00 p.m.	at Buffalo	University at Buffalo Stadium; Amherst, NY	CBSSN	L 48–51 ^{OT}	12,708
November 23	2:00 p.m.	Bowling Green	Scheumann Stadium; Muncie, IN	ESPN+	L 13–38	7,116
November 29	12:00 p.m.	at Ohio	Peden Stadium; Athens, OH	CBSSN	L 21–42	11,804
*Non-conference game; ^{†}Homecoming; Rankings from AP Poll and CFP Rankings released prior to game; All times are in Eastern time

== Game summaries ==
=== Missouri State (FCS) ===
Game One – Missouri State Bears (FCS) (0–1) at Ball State Cardinals (0–0) – Game summary

Quarter	1	2	3	4	Total
Bears (FCS)	7	0	7	20	34
Cardinals	0	7	7	28	42

at Scheumann Stadium, Muncie, IN

- Date: Saturday September 7, 2024
- Game time: 2:00 p.m. EDT
- Game weather: Sunny, 64 °F (18 °C)
- Game attendance: 10,018
- Referee: Billy Williams
- TV announcers (ESPN+): Kelsie Kasper (play-by-play) and Ryan Cavanaugh (analyst)

Statistics	MOST	BALL
First downs	18	25
Total yards	320	435
Rushing yards	62	173
Passing yards	258	262
Passing: Comp–Att–Int	19–32–1	28–38–1
Time of possession	21:30	38:30

Team	Category	Player	Statistics
Missouri State	Passing	Jacob Clark	19/32, 258 yards, 2 TD, INT
Missouri State	Rushing	Jacardia Wright	15 carries, 46 yards, TD
Missouri State	Receiving	Jmariyae Robinson	7 receptions, 102 yards, TD
Ball State	Passing	Kadin Semonza	28/38, 262 yards, 4 TD, INT
Ball State	Rushing	Braedon Sloan	21 carries, 103 yards, TD
Ball State	Receiving	Cam Pickett	7 receptions, 69 yards

=== at No. 10 Miami (FL) ===
Game Two – Ball State Cardinals (1–0) vs No. 10 Miami Hurricanes (2–0) – Game summary

Quarter	1	2	3	4	Total
Cardinals	0	0	0	0	0
No. 10 Hurricanes	10	21	10	21	62

at Hard Rock Stadium • Miami Gardens, FL

- Date: September 14, 2024
- Game time: 3:30 p.m.
- Game attendance: 51,564
- TV announcers (ACCN): Chris Cotter (play-by-play), Mark Herzlich (analyst), and Coley Harvey (sideline reporter)

Game information

First quarter

- (6:15) MIA – Andres Borregales 30-yard field goal (Drive: 11 plays, 71 yards, 5:10; Miami 3–0)
- (1:25) MIA – Xavier Restrepo 21-yard pass from Cam Ward, Andres Borregales kick (Drive: 5 plays, 60 yards, 2:34; Miami 10–0)

Second quarter

- (4:46) MIA – Chris Johnson Jr. 37-yard pass from Cam Ward, Andres Borregales kick (Drive: 7 plays, 82 yards, 2:51; Miami 17–0)
- (1:53) MIA – Elijah Arroyo 21-yard pass from Cam Ward, Andres Borregales kick (Drive: 2 plays, 53 yards, 0:16; Miami 24–0)
- (1:30) MIA – Xavier Restrepo 20-yard pass from Cam Ward, Andres Borregales kick (Drive: 2 plays, 20 yards, 0:12; Miami 31–0)

Third quarter

- (12:26) MIA – Jacolby George 17-yard pass from Cam Ward, Andres Borregales kick (Drive: 6 plays, 71 yards, 2:27; Miami 38–0)
- (3:24) MIA – Andres Borregales 32-yard field goal (Drive: 13 plays, 63 yards, 6:54; Miami 41–0)

Fourth quarter

- (14:49) MIA – Ajay Allen 56-yard run, Abram Murray kick (Drive: 2 plays, 90 yards, 0:23; Miami 48–0)
- (11:46) MIA – Elija Lofton 40-yard pass from Emory Williams, Abram Murray kick (Drive: 3 plays, 57 yards, 1:14; Miami 55–0)
- (6:40) MIA – Jordan Lyle 7-yard run, Abram Murray kick (Drive: 7 plays, 60 yards, 4:10; Miami 62–0)

Statistics	BALL	MIA
First downs	9	31
Total yards	115	750
Rushing yards	6	243
Passing yards	109	507
Passing: Comp–Att–Int	18–32–1	30–40–0
Time of possession	27:01	32:59

Team	Category	Player	Statistics
Ball State	Passing	Kadin Semonza	16/26, 111 yards, INT
Ball State	Rushing	Braedon Sloan	5 carries, 13 yards
Ball State	Receiving	Braedon Sloan	4 receptions, 41 yards
Miami (FL)	Passing	Cam Ward	19/28, 346 yards, 5 TD
Miami (FL)	Rushing	Ajay Allen	7 carries, 104 yards, TD
Miami (FL)	Receiving	Jacolby George	6 receptions, 109 yards, TD

=== at Central Michigan ===
Game Three – Ball State Cardinals (1–1) at Central Michigan Chippewas (1–2) – Game summary

Quarter	1	2	3	4	Total
Cardinals	10	7	7	10	34
Chippewas	0	23	0	14	37

at Kelly/Shorts Stadium, Mount Pleasant, Michigan

- Date: September 21, 2024
- Game time: 1:00pm
- Game weather: Sunny, 79 °F (26 °C), W 3 mph
- Game attendance: 18,011
- Referee: Matt Packowski
- TV announcers (ESPN+): Michael Reghi (play-by-play) and Marcus Ray (analyst)

Game information

First quarter

- BALL – Carson Holmer 31-yard field goal, 7:21. Ball State 3–0. Drive: 10 plays, 53 yards, 4:23.
- BALL – Qian Magwood 6-yard pass from Kadin Semonza (Carson Holmer kick), 0:37. Ball State 10–0. Drive: 7 plays, 63 yards, 3:26.

Second quarter

- CMU – Bert Emanuel Jr. 20-yard run (Tristan Mattson kick), 10:00. Ball State 10–7. Drive: 3 plays, 62 yards, 1:18.
- CMU – Chris Parker 7-yard pass from Bert Emanuel Jr. (Tristan Mattson kick), 5:37. Central Michigan 14–10. Drive: 3 plays, 80 yards, 1:33.
- CMU – Marion Lukes 2-yard run (PAT blocked), 1:43. Central Michigan 20–10. Drive: 6 plays, 41 yards, 1:49.
- BALL – Malcolm Gillie 23-yard pass from Kadin Semonza (Carson Holmer kick), 0:20. Central Michigan 20–17. Drive: 9 plays, 75 yards, 1:23.
- CMU – Tristan Mattson 33-yard field goal, 0:00. Central Michigan 23–17. Drive: 3 plays, 60 yards, 0:20.

Third quarter

- BALL – Braedon Sloan 22-yard run (Carson Holmer kick), 8:56. Ball State 24–23. Drive: 11 plays, 75 yards, 6:04.

Fourth quarter

- BALL – Carson Holmer 40-yard field goal, 8:39. Ball State 27–23. Drive: 8 plays, 38 yards, 4:05.
- CMU – Bert Emanuel Jr. 16-yard run (Tristan Mattson kick), 5:02. Central Michigan 30-27. Drive: 9 plays, 75 yards, 3:37.
- BALL – Tanner Koziol 16-yard pass from Kadin Semonza (Carson Holmer kick), 0:53. Ball State 34–30. Drive: 5 plays, 97 yards, 1:06.
- CMU – Chris Parker 20-yard pass from Joe Labas (Tristan Mattson kick), 0:16. Central Michigan 37–34. Drive: 5 plays, 75 yards, 0:37.

Statistics	BALL	CMU
First downs	27	19
Plays–yards	77–431	54–527
Rushing yards	37–146	33–335
Passing yards	285	192
Passing: Comp–Att–Int	30–40–0	15–21–0
Time of possession	36:40	23:20

Team	Category	Player	Statistics
Ball State	Passing	Kadin Semonza	30/40, 285 yards, 3 TD
Ball State	Rushing	Braedon Sloan	19 carries, 94 yards, TD
Ball State	Receiving	Tanner Koziol	9 receptions, 112 yards, TD
Central Michigan	Passing	Joe Labas	14/20, 185 yards, TD
Central Michigan	Rushing	B.J. Harris	8 carries, 151 yards
Central Michigan	Receiving	Chris Parker	5 receptions, 79 yards, 2 TD

=== at James Madison ===
Game Four – Ball State Cardinals (1–2) at James Madison Dukes (3–0) – Game summary

Quarter	1	2	3	4	Total
Cardinals	7	0	0	0	7
Dukes	22	7	20	14	63

at Bridgeforth Stadium • Harrisonburg, VA

- Date: Saturday September 28, 2024
- Game time: 1:30 p.m.
- Game weather: Sunny • Temperature: 75 °F (24 °C) • Wind: S at 7 miles per hour (11 km/h)
- Game attendance: 25,786
- Referee: Jeremy Parker
- TV announcers (ESPN+): Curt Dudley (play-by-play), Brian Barlow (analyst) and David Hulvey (sideline)

Game information

First quarter

- (10:15) JMU – Yamir Knight 12-yard pass from Alonza Barnett III, Noe Ruelas kick (Drive: 11 plays, 66 yards, 4:37; James Madison 7–0)
- (6:54) JMU – George Pettaway 24-yard run, Taylor Thompson rush (Drive: 5 plays, 35 yards, 1:24; James Madison 15–0)
- (3:34) BALL – Tanner Koziol 15-yard pass from Kadin Semonza, Carson Holmer kick (Drive: 7 plays, 75 yards, 3:20; James Madison 15–7)
- (1:51) JMU – Omarion Dollison 5-yard pass from Alonza Barnett III, Noe Ruelas kick (Drive: 8 plays, 75 yards, 1:43; James Madison 22–7)

Second quarter

- (4:20) JMU – Yamir Knight 10-yard pass from Alonza Barnett III, Noe Ruelas kick (Drive: 9 plays, 59 yards, 4:32; James Madison 29–7)

Third quarter

- (13:58) JMU – Eric O'Neill 27-yard interception (James Madison 35–7)
- (9:45) JMU – Cam Ross 26-yard pass from Alonza Barnett III, Noe Ruelas kick (Drive: 4 plays, 55 yards, 1:19; James Madison 42–7)
- (7:19) JMU – Alonza Barnett III 18-yard run, Noe Ruelas kick (Drive: 2 plays, 33 yards, 0:42; James Madison 49–7)

Fourth quarter

- (10:55) JMU – Taylor Thompson 22-yard pass from Alonza Barnett III, Noe Ruelas kick (Drive: 9 plays, 94 yards, 4:13; James Madison 56–7)
- (2:40) JMU – Jobi Malary 32-yard run, Max Lipinski kick (Drive: 10 plays, 59 yards, 6:41; James Madison 63–7)

Statistics	BALL	JMU
First downs	19	29
Total yards	250	522
Rushing yards	77	236
Passing yards	173	286
Passing: Comp–Att–Int	28–38–3	21–29–0
Time of possession	33:41	26:19

Team	Category	Player	Statistics
Ball State	Passing	Kadin Semonza	22/35, 168 yards, TD, 3 INT
Ball State	Rushing	Braedon Sloan	14 carries, 72 yards
Ball State	Receiving	Tanner Koziol	9 receptions, 78 yards, TD
James Madison	Passing	Alonza Barnett III	20/28, 280 yards, 5 TD
James Madison	Rushing	Wayne Knight	6 carries, 63 yards
James Madison	Receiving	Taylor Thompson	5 receptions, 91 yards, TD

=== Western Michigan ===
Game Five – Western Michigan Broncos (1–3) at Ball State Cardinals (1–3) – Game summary

Quarter	1	2	3	4	Total
Broncos	21	0	10	14	45
Cardinals	14	7	14	7	42

at Scheumann Stadium, Muncie, IN

- Date: Saturday October 5, 2024
- Game time: 2:00 p.m.
- Game weather: Sunny • Temperature: 76 °F (24 °C) • Wind: SE 9 miles per hour (14 km/h)
- Game attendance: 10,342
- Referee: Andrew Speciale
- TV announcers (ESPN+): Jason Ross Jr. (play-by-play) and Tyoka Jackson (analyst)

Game information

First quarter

- (8:39) WMU – Jaden Nixon 21-yard run, Luka Zurak kick (Drive: 9 plays, 85 yards, 4:18; Western Michigan 7–0)
- (7:43) WMU – Blake Bosma 10-yard pass from Hayden Wolff, Luka Zurak kick (Drive: 2 plays, 10 yards, 0:41; Western Michigan 14–0)
- (7:29) BALL – Malcolm Gillie 97-yard kickoff return, Jackson Courville kick (Western Michigan 14–7)
- (5:02) BALL – Ty Robinson 21-yard pass from Kadin Semonza, Jackson Courville kick (Drive: 4 plays, 95 yards, 1:30; Tied 14–14)
- (4:09) WMU – Jaden Nixon 57-yard run, Luka Zurak kick (Drive: 2 plays, 65 yards, 0:53; Western Michigan 21–14)

Second quarter

- (9:54) BALL – Cam Pickett 4-yard run, Jackson Courville kick (Drive: 15 plays, 83 yards, 9:10; Tied 21–21)

Third quarter

- (12:13) WMU – Malique Dieudonne 43-yard pass from Hayden Wolff, Luka Zurak kick (Drive: 6 plays, 69 yards, 2:41; Western Michigan 28–21)
- (9:50) BALL – Christian Abney 22-yard pass from Braedon Sloan, Jackson Courville kick (Drive: 5 plays, 66 yards, 2:15; Tied 28–28)
- (7:52) BALL – Drew Hughes 2-yard pass from Kadin Semonza, Jackson Courville kick (Drive: 4 plays, 28 yards, 1:52; Ball State 35–28)
- (0:21) WMU – Luka Zurak 39-yard field goal (Drive: 14 plays, 53 yards, 7:31; Ball State 35–31)

Fourth quarter

- (13:19) WMU – Jaden Nixon 23-yard run, Luka Zurak kick (Drive: 3 plays, 32 yards, 0:57; Western Michigan 38–35)
- (7:43) WMU – Anthony Sambucci 1-yard pass from Hayden Wolff, Luka Zurak kick (Drive: 7 plays, 65 yards, 3:32; Western Michigan 45–35)
- (1:47) BALL – Cam Pickett 27-yard pass from Kadin Semonza, Jackson Courville kick (Drive: 8 plays, 85 yards, 1:20; Western Michigan 45–42)

Statistics	WMU	BALL
First downs	23	23
Total yards	397	461
Rushing yards	197	68
Passing yards	264	329
Turnovers	1	3
Time of possession	32:30	27:30

Team	Category	Player	Statistics
Western Michigan	Passing	Hayden Wolff	26/29, 264 yards, 3 TD
Western Michigan	Rushing	Jaden Nixon	14 carries, 124 yards, 3 TD
Western Michigan	Receiving	Anthony Sambucci	9 receptions, 74 yards, TD
Ball State	Passing	Kadin Semonza	21/34, 307 yards, 3 TD, 2 INT
Ball State	Rushing	Braedon Sloan	18 carries, 65 yards
Ball State	Receiving	Tanner Koziol	9 receptions, 102 yards

=== at Kent State ===
Game Six – Ball State Cardinals (1–4) at Kent State Golden Flashes (0–5) – Game summary

Quarter	1	2	3	4	Total
Cardinals	10	10	7	10	37
Golden Flashes	0	7	7	21	35

at Dix Stadium • Kent, OH

- Date: Saturday October 12, 2024
- Game time: 12:00 p.m. EDT
- Game weather: Cloudy • Temperature: 62 °F (17 °C) • Wind: NE at 5 miles per hour (8.0 km/h)
- Game attendance: 7,322
- Referee: Jeremy Valentine
- TV announcers (ESPN+): Anthony Lima (play-by-play) and Ryan Cavanaugh (analyst)

Game information

First quarter

- (12:14) BSU – Braedon Sloan 1-yard run, Jackson Courville kick (Drive: 5 plays, 35 yards, 1:32; Ball State 7–0)
- (5:38) BSU – Jackson Courville 34-yard field goal (Drive: 12 plays, 45 yards, 6:02; Ball State 10–0)

Second quarter

- (14:54) KSU – Chrishon McCray 24-yard pass from Tommy Ulatowski, Will Hryszko kick (Drive: 4 plays, 74 yards, 0:57; Ball State 10–7)
- (6:49) BSU – Braedon Sloan 1-yard run, Jackson Courville kick (Drive: 6 plays, 44 yards, 2:03; Ball State 17–7)
- (0:42) BSU – Jackson Courville 35-yard field goal (Drive: 10 plays, 55 yards, 3:16; Ball State 20–7)

Third quarter

- (9:28) BSU – Qian Magwood 13-yard pass from Kadin Semonza, Jackson Courville kick (Drive: 11 plays, 75 yards, 5:32; Ball State 27–7)
- (5:47) KSU – Ky Thomas 4-yard run, Will Hryszko kick (Drive: 6 plays, 72 yards, 3:31; Ball State 27–14)

Fourth quarter

- (6:19) KSU – Chrishon McCray 63-yard pass from Tommy Ulatowski, Will Hryszko kick (Drive: 6 plays, 84 yards, 3:18; Ball State 27–21)
- (3:19) BSU – Jackson Courville 38-yard field goal (Drive: 9 plays, 55 yards, 3:00; Ball State 30–21)
- (1:28) KSU – Luke Floriea 18-yard pass from Tommy Ulatowski, Will Hryszko kick (Drive: 10 plays, 62 yards, 1:46; Ball State 30–28)
- (1:13) BSU – Vaughn Pemberton 41-yard run, Jackson Courville kick (Drive: 2 plays, 40 yards, 0:14; Ball State 37–28)
- (0:30) KSU – Chrishon McCray 57-yard pass from Tommy Ulatowski, Will Hryszko kick (Drive: 4 plays, 77 yards, 0:38; Ball State 37–35)

Statistics	BALL	KENT
First downs	24	20
Total yards	406	461
Rushing yards	191	67
Passing yards	215	394
Passing: Comp–Att–Int	21–34–0	17–36–1
Time of possession	33:11	26:49

Team	Category	Player	Statistics
Ball State	Passing	Kadin Semonza	21/34, 215 yards, TD
Ball State	Rushing	Braedon Sloan	22 carries, 76 yards, 2 TD
Ball State	Receiving	Malcolm Gillie	2 receptions, 61 yards
Kent State	Passing	Tommy Ulatowski	17/36, 394 yards, 4 TD, INT
Kent State	Rushing	Ky Thomas	17 carries, 67 yards, TD
Kent State	Receiving	Chrishon McCray	8 receptions, 213 yards, 3 TD

=== at Vanderbilt ===
Game Seven – Ball State Cardinals (2–4) at Vanderbilt Commodores (4–2) – Game summary

Quarter	1	2	3	4	Total
Cardinals	7	0	7	0	14
Commodores	3	11	0	10	24

at FirstBank Stadium • Nashville, TN

- Date: Saturday October 19, 2024
- Game time: 7:00 p.m. EDT
- Game weather: Clear, 64 °F (18 °C)
- Game attendance: 27,884
- Referee: Jeff Heaser
- TV announcers (SECN+/ESPN+): Richard Cross (play-by-play) and Charles Arbuckle (analyst)

Game information

First quarter

- BALL – Kiael Kelly 9-yard run (Jason Courville kick), 8:06. Cardinals 7–0. Drive: 11 plays, 75 yards, 6:54.
- VAN – Brock Taylor 27-yard field goal, 1:42. Cardinals 7–3. Drive: 11 plays, 66 yards, 6:24.

Second quarter

- VAN – Brock Taylor 24-yard field goal, 11:37. Cardinals 7–6. Drive: 7 plays, 81 yards, 3:32.
- VAN – Eli Stowers 41-yard pass from Diego Pavia (Diego Pavia pass to Cole Spence), 2:39. Commodores 14–7. Drive: 11 plays, 97 yards, 3:45.

Third quarter

- BALL – Tanner Koziol 7-yard pass from Kadin Semonza (Jackson Courville kick), 6:03. Tied 14–14. Drive: 11 plays, 94 yards, 6:34.

Fourth quarter

- VAN – Brock Taylor 38-yard field goal, 14:44. Commodores 17–14. Drive: 14 plays, 54 yards, 6:14.
- VAN – Diego Pavia 5-yard run (Brock Taylor kick), 7:48. Commodores 24–14. Drive: 8 plays, 45 yards, 4:03.

Statistics	BALL	VAN
First downs	16	21
Total yards	268	420
Rushing yards	78	145
Passing yards	190	275
Passing: Comp–Att–Int	21–29–0	17–31–0
Time of possession	25:25	34:35

Team	Category	Player	Statistics
Ball State	Passing	Kadin Semonza	21/29, 190 yards, TD
Ball State	Rushing	Vaughn Pemberton	5 carries, 32 yards
Ball State	Receiving	Tanner Koziol	9 receptions, 68 yards, TD
Vanderbilt	Passing	Diego Pavia	17/31, 275 yards, TD
Vanderbilt	Rushing	Diego Pavia	13 carries, 82 yards, TD
Vanderbilt	Receiving	Eli Stowers	8 receptions, 130 yards, TD

=== Northern Illinois (Bronze Stalk Trophy) ===
Game Eight – Northern Illinois Huskies (4–3) at Ball State Cardinals (2–5) – Game summary

Quarter	1	2	3	4	Total
Huskies	0	0	0	0	0
Cardinals	0	0	0	0	0

at Scheumann Stadium, Muncie, IN

- Date: Saturday October 26, 2024
- Game time: 3:30 p.m.
- Game weather: Sunny • Temperature: 58 °F (14 °C) • Wind: N at 10 miles per hour (16 km/h)
- Game attendance: 15,318
- Referee: David Siegle
- TV announcers (ESPN+): Kelsie Kaspar (play-by-play) and Marcus Ray (analyst)

Game information
First quarter
- BALL – Tanner Koziol 3-yard pass from Kadin Semonza (Jackson Courville kick), 10:26. Cardinals 7–0. Drive: 10 plays, 62 yards, 4:27.
- NIU – Antario Brown 34-yard run (Kanon Woodill kick), 2:23. Tied 7–7. Drive: 7 plays, 90 yards, 4:08.

Second quarter

- BALL – Jackson Courville 24-yard field goal, 12:44. Cardinals 10–7. Drive: 7 plays, 68 yards, 3:05.
- BALL – Jackson Courville 47-yard field goal, 9:40. Cardinals 13–7. Drive: 4 plays, 2 yards, 1:30.
- BALL – Tanner Koziol 6-yard pass from Kadin Semonza (PAT missed), 1:51. Cardinals 19–7. Drive: 12 plays, 63 yards, 4:45.
- NIU – Cam Thompson 54-yard pass from Ethan Hampton (Kanon Woodill kick), 1:12. Cardinals 19–14. Drive: 6 plays, 75 yards, 0:39.

Third quarter

- No scoring plays

Fourth quarter

- BALL – Jackson Courville 50-yard field goal, 8:52. Cardinals 22–14. Drive: 10 plays, 22 yards, 4:33.
- NIU – Antario Brown 6-yard run (2-point conversion failed), 4:57. Cardinals 22–20. Drive: 10 plays, 75 yards, 3:54.
- NIU – Kanon Woodill 47-yard field goal, 0:15. Huskies 23–22. Drive: 12 plays, 50 yards, 1:36.
- BALL – Jackson Courville 52-yard field goal, 0:02. Cardinals 25–23. Drive: 3 plays, 39 yards, 0:11.

Statistics	NIU	BALL
First downs	22	21
Total yards	374	392
Rushing yards	142	170
Passing yards	232	222
Turnovers	4	0
Time of possession	25:08	34:52

Team	Category	Player	Statistics
Northern Illinois	Passing	Ethan Hampton	18/33, 168 yards, TD, INT
Northern Illinois	Rushing	Antario Brown	11 carries, 62 yards, 2 TD
Northern Illinois	Receiving	Cam Thompson	8 receptions, 128 yards, TD
Ball State	Passing	Kadin Semonza	20/33, 211 yards, 2 TD
Ball State	Rushing	Vaughn Pemberton	14 carries, 69 yards
Ball State	Receiving	Tanner Koziol	9 receptions, 78 yards, 2 TD

=== Miami (OH) ===
Game Nine – Miami RedHawks (4–4) at Ball State Cardinals (3–5) – Game summary

Quarter	1	2	3	4	Total
RedHawks	7	14	0	6	27
Cardinals	7	6	8	0	21

at Scheumann Stadium, Muncie, IN

- Date: Tuesday November 5, 2024
- Game time: 8:00 p.m.
- Game weather: Rain • Temperature: 69 °F (21 °C) • Wind: S at 17 miles per hour (27 km/h)
- Game attendance: 6,412
- Referee: Andrew Speciale
- TV announcers (ESPN): Matt Schumacker (play-by-play) and Dustin Fox (analyst)

Game information

First quarter

- (8:24) BALL – Brandon Berger 46-yard interception (Jackson Courville kick) (Ball State 7-0)
- (5:48) MOH – Reggie Virgil 34-yard pass from Brett Gabbert (Dom Dzioban kick) (Drive: 5 plays, 75 yards, 2:36; Tied 7-7)

Second quarter

- (13:28) BALL – Jackson Courville 27-yard field goal (Drive: 12 plays, 75 yards, 7:15; Ball State 10-7)
- (8:52) MOH – Kevin Davis 12-yard pass from Brett Gabbert (Dom Dzioban kick) (Drive: 9 plays, 68 yards, 4:32; Miami (OH) 14-10)
- (4:33) BALL – Jackson Courville 21-yard field goal (Drive: 8 plays, 71 yards, 4:19; Miami (OH) 14-13)
- (0:33) MOH – Javon Tracy 10-yard pass from Brett Gabbert (Dom Dzioban kick) (Drive: 7 plays, 75 yards, 4:00; Miami (OH) 21-13)

Third quarter

- (8:01) BALL – Justin Bowick 55-yard pass from Kadin Semonza (Cam Pickett rush) (Drive: 4 plays, 70 yards, 0:48; Tied 21-21)

Fourth quarter

- (11:13) MOH – Dom Dzioban 28-yard field goal (Drive: 12 plays, 52 yards, 6:07; Miami (OH) 24-21)
- (1:48) MOH – Dom Dzioban 39-yard field goal (Drive: 9 plays, 24 yards, 4:40; Miami (OH) 27-21)

Statistics	M-OH	BALL
First downs	19	19
Total yards	333	331
Rushing yards	114	51
Passing yards	219	280
Turnovers	1	2
Time of possession	32:52	27:08

Team	Category	Player	Statistics
Miami (OH)	Passing	Brett Gabbert	16/32, 219 yards, 3 TD
Miami (OH)	Rushing	Keyon Mozee	22 carries, 105 yards
Miami (OH)	Receiving	Reggie Virgil	5 receptions, 101 yards, TD
Ball State	Passing	Kadin Semonza	23/36, 280 yards, TD, 2 INT
Ball State	Rushing	Vaughn Pemberton	5 carries, 21 yards
Ball State	Receiving	Justin Bowick	8 receptions, 171 yards, TD

=== at Buffalo ===
Game Ten – Ball State Cardinals (3–6) at Buffalo Bulls (5–4) – Game summary

Quarter	1	2	3	4	OT	Total
Ball State	7	21	7	10	3	48
Buffalo	7	17	7	14	6	51

at UB Stadium, Amherst, New York

- Date: Tuesday November 12, 2024
- Game time: 7:00 p.m.
- Game weather: Sunny, 41 °F (5 °C)
- Game attendance: 12,708
- Referee: Matt Packowski
- TV announcers (CBSSN): Dave Ryan (play-by-play) and Adam Breneman (analyst)

Game information

First quarter

- (7:47) BUFF – C.J. Ogbonna 3-yard run (Upton Bellenfant kick) (Drive: 16 plays, 75 yards, 7:13; Buffalo 7-0)
- (4:34) BALL – Justin Bowick 23-yard pass from Kadin Semonza (Jackson Courville kick) (Drive: 7 plays, 81 yards, 3:08; Tied 7-7)

Second quarter

- (14:55) BALL – Tanner Koziol 2-yard pass from Kadin Semonza (Jackson Courville kick) (Drive: 7 plays, 73 yards, 3:16; Ball State 14-7)
- (12:06) BUFF – Upton Bellenfant 27-yard field goal (Drive: 8 plays, 53 yards, 2:39; Ball State 14-10)
- (8:14) BALL – Vaughn Pemberton 1-yard run (Jackson Courville kick) (Drive: 7 plays, 77 yards, 3:45; Ball State 21-10)
- (3:40) BUFF – Al-Jay Henderson 6-yard run (Upton Bellenfant kick) (Drive: 6 plays, 80 yards, 1:42; Ball State 21-17)
- (1:12) BALL – Justin Bowick 22-yard pass from Kadin Semonza (Jackson Courville kick) (Drive: 6 plays, 63 yards, 2:20; Ball State 28-17)
- (0:00) BUFF – Victor Snow 2-yard pass from C.J. Ogbonna (Upton Bellenfant kick) (Drive: 2 plays, 2 yards, 0:09; Ball State 28-24)

Third quarter

- (5:56) BUFF – Al-Jay Henderson 4-yard run (Upton Bellenfant kick) (Drive: 9 plays, 63 yards, 4:41; Buffalo 31-28)
- (2:46) BALL – Cam Pickett 65-yard pass from Kadin Semonza (Jackson Courville kick) (Drive: 2 plays, 65 yards, 0:16; Ball State 35-31)

Fourth quarter

- (14:56) BALL – Cam Pickett 9-yard run (Jackson Courville kick) (Drive: 4 plays, 19 yards, 2:13; Ball State 42-31)
- (7:08) BALL – Jackson Courville 27-yard field goal (Drive: 9 plays, 58 yards, 5:00; Ball State 45-31)
- (5:43) BUFF – C.J. Ogbonna 26-yard run (run failed) (Drive: 8 plays, 75 yards, 1:25; Ball State 45-37)
- (1:49) BUFF – JJ Jenkins 33-yard pass from C.J. Ogbonna (C.J. Ogbonna pass to Jake Orlando) (Drive: 10 plays, 73 yards, 1:27; Tied 45-45)

Overtime

- BALL – Jackson Courville 36-yard field goal (Drive: 4 plays, 6 yards, 0:00; Ball State 48-45)
- BUFF – Lamar Sperling 14-yard pass from C.J. Ogbonna (Drive: 2 plays, 25 yards, 0:00; Buffalo 51-48)

Statistics	BALL	UB
First downs	24	26
Plays–yards	74–520	78–470
Rushing yards	37–193	41–206
Passing yards	327	264
Passing: Comp–Att–Int	25–37–1	19–37–2
Time of possession	33:13	26:26

Team	Category	Player	Statistics
Ball State	Passing	Kadin Semonza	25/37, 327 yards, 4 TD, INT
Ball State	Rushing	Kadin Semonza	4 carries, 53 yards
Ball State	Receiving	Justin Bowick	7 receptions, 148 yards, 2 TD
Buffalo	Passing	C.J. Ogbonna	19/37, 264 yards, 3 TD, 2 INT
Buffalo	Rushing	Al-Jay Henderson	27 carries, 126 yards, 2 TD
Buffalo	Receiving	JJ Jenkins	8 receptions, 131 yards, TD

=== Bowling Green ===
Game Eleven – Bowling Green Falcons (6–4) at Ball State Cardinals (3–7) – Game summary

Quarter	1	2	3	4	Total
Falcons	7	3	18	10	38
Cardinals	0	7	0	6	13

at Scheumann Stadium, Muncie, IN

- Date: Saturday November 23, 2024
- Game time: 2:00 p.m.
- Game weather: Cloudy • Temperature: 40 °F (4 °C) • Wind: W at 13 miles per hour (21 km/h)
- Game attendance: 7,116
- Referee: Greg Sujack
- TV announcers (ESPN+): Michael Reghi (play-by-play) and Je'Rod Cherry (analyst)

Game information

First quarter

- (4:46) BGSU – Harold Fannin Jr. 4-yard pass from Connor Bazelak (Zach Long kick) (Drive: 15 plays, 93 yards, 8:44; Bowling Green 7-0)

Second quarter

- (1:36) BGSU – Zach Long 43-yard field goal (Drive: 9 plays, 32 yards, 3:08; Bowling Green 10-0)
- (0:34) BALL – Vaughn Pemberton 51-yard pass from Kadin Semonza (Jackson Courville kick) (Drive: 6 plays, 69 yards, :54; Bowling Green 10-7)

Third quarter

- (7:58) BGSU – Zach Long 36-yard field goal (Drive: 14 plays, 51 yards, 6:55; Bowling Green 13-7)
- (4:01) BGSU – Rahkeem Smith 1-yard run (Two-point pass to Jamal Johnson) (Drive: 5 plays, 46 yards, 2:13; Bowling Green 21-7)
- (2:16) BGSU – Rahkeem Smith 66-yard pass from Connor Bazelak (Zach Long kick) (Drive: 2 plays, 70 yards, :48; Bowling Green 28-7)

Fourth quarter

- (12:25) BGSU – Zach Long 48-yard field goal (Drive: 7 plays, 16 yards, 2:24; Bowling Green 31-7)
- (8:30) BALL – Qian Magwood 13-yard pass from Kadin Semonza (Two-point pass failed) (Drive: 9 plays, 73 yards, 3:50; Bowling Green 31-13)
- (1:55) BGSU – Rahkeem Smith 4-yard pass from Lucian Anderson III (Zach Long kick) (Drive: 7 plays, 26 yards, 3:23; Bowling Green 38-13)

Statistics	BGSU	BALL
First downs	17	15
Total yards	362	254
Rushing yards	103	43
Passing yards	259	211
Turnovers	1	1
Time of possession	34:57	25:03

Team	Category	Player	Statistics
Bowling Green	Passing	Connor Bazelak	18/29, 255 yards, 2 TD
Bowling Green	Rushing	Terion Stewart	10 carries, 32 yards
Bowling Green	Receiving	Harold Fannin Jr.	9 receptions, 125 yards, TD
Ball State	Passing	Kadin Semonza	19/37, 211 yards, 2 TD
Ball State	Rushing	Vaughn Pemberton	5 carries, 29 yards
Ball State	Receiving	Vaughn Pemberton	3 receptions, 70 yards, TD

=== at Ohio ===
Game Twelve – Ball State Cardinals (3–8) at Ohio Bobcats (8–3) – Game summary

Quarter	1	2	3	4	Total
Cardinals	0	7	7	7	21
Bobcats	14	7	14	7	42

at Peden Stadium, Athens, Ohio

- Date: Friday November 29, 2024
- Game time: 12:00 p.m.
- Game weather: Sunny • Temperature: 33 °F (1 °C)
- Game attendance: 11,804
- Referee: David Siegle
- TV announcers (CBSSN): Chris Lewis (play-by-play) and Donte Whitmer (analyst)

Game information

First quarter

- (12:18) OHIO – Coleman Owen 50-yard pass from Parker Navarro (Gianni Spetic kick), Drive: 5 plays, 78 yards, 2:37; OHIO 7–0
- (07:48) OHIO – Coleman Owen 41-yard pass from Parker Navarro (Gianni Spetic kick), Drive: 3 plays, 20 yards, 1:29; OHIO 14–0

Second quarter

- (08:25) OHIO – Parker Navarro 20-yard run (Gianni Spetic kick), Drive: 5 plays, 80 yards, 2:51; OHIO 21–0
- (06:13) BALL – Dahya Patel 33-yard pass from Kadin Semonza (Jackson Courville kick), Drive: 6 plays, 70 yards, 2:05; OHIO 21–7

Third quarter

- (13:58) OHIO – Mason Williams 15-yard pass from Parker Navarro (Gianni Spetic kick), Drive: 2 plays, 16 yards, 0:42; OHIO 28–7
- (06:40) OHIO – Parker Navarro 4-yard run (Gianni Spetic kick), Drive: 8 plays, 80 yards, 5:05; OHIO 35–7
- (03:54) BALL – Tanner Koziol 11-yard pass from Kadin Semonza (Jackson Courville kick), Drive: 7 plays, 55 yards, 2:39; OHIO 35–14

Fourth quarter

- (05:25) OHIO – Max Rodarte 19-yard pass from Nick Poulos (Gianni Spetic kick), Drive: 6 plays, 39 yards, 3:44; OHIO 42–14
- (02:42) BALL – Jamarion McDougle 27-yard pass from Kadin Semonza (Jackson Courville kick), Drive: 7 plays, 74 yards, 2:35; OHIO 42–21

Statistics	BALL	OHIO
First downs	21	22
Plays–yards	73–375	56–475
Rushing yards	26–42	41–270
Passing yards	333	205
Passing: Comp–Att–Int	29–47–0	9–15–1
Time of possession	29:16	30:44

Team	Category	Player	Statistics
Ball State	Passing	Kadin Semonza	29/47, 333 yards, 3 TD
Ball State	Rushing	Braedon Sloan	10 carries, 31 yards
Ball State	Receiving	Cam Pickett	9 receptions, 119 yards
Ohio	Passing	Parker Navarro	7/11, 169 yards, 3 TD, 1 INT
Ohio	Rushing	Parker Navarro	11 carries, 110 yards, 2 TD
Ohio	Receiving	Coleman Owen	5 receptions, 142 yards, 2 TD
