= 2024 Western Michigan Broncos football team =

American college football season

2024 Western Michigan Broncos football

Salute to Veterans Bowl, L 23–30 vs. South Alabama
- Conference: Mid-American Conference
- Record: 6–7 (5–3 MAC)
- Head coach: Lance Taylor (2nd season)
- Offensive coordinator: Walt Bell (1st season)
- Offensive scheme: Multiple
- Defensive coordinator: Scott Power (1st season)
- Base defense: 4–3
- Home stadium: Waldo Stadium

2024 Mid-American Conference football standings
	Conf.			Overall
Team	W		L	W		L
Ohio y$	7	–	1	11	–	3
Miami (OH) y	7	–	1	9	–	5
Buffalo	6	–	2	9	–	4
Bowling Green	6	–	2	7	–	6
Western Michigan	5	–	3	6	–	7
Toledo	4	–	4	8	–	5
Northern Illinois	4	–	4	8	–	5
Akron	3	–	5	4	–	8
Eastern Michigan	2	–	6	5	–	7
Central Michigan	2	–	6	4	–	8
Ball State	2	–	6	3	–	9
Kent State	0	–	8	0	–	12
Championship: Ohio 38, Miami (OH) 3
$ – Conference champion; y – Championship game participant

The 2024 Western Michigan Broncos football team represented Western Michigan University in the Mid-American Conference during the 2024 NCAA Division I FBS football season. The Broncos were led by Lance Taylor in his second year as the head coach. The Broncos played their home games at Waldo Stadium, located in Kalamazoo, Michigan.

== Preseason ==
=== Preseason polls ===
On July 19 the MAC announced the preseason coaches poll. Western Michigan was picked to finish seventh in the conference. The Broncos received zero votes to win the MAC Championship.

== Schedule ==
Date	Time	Opponent	Site	TV	Result	Attendance
August 30	9:00 p.m.	at Wisconsin*	Camp Randall Stadium; Madison, WI	FS1	L 14–28	75,158
September 7	7:30 p.m.	at No. 2 Ohio State*	Ohio Stadium; Columbus, OH	BTN	L 0–56	102,665
September 14	6:30 p.m.	Bethune–Cookman*	Waldo Stadium; Kalamazoo, MI	ESPN+	W 59–31	23,476
September 28	3:30 p.m.	at Marshall*	Joan C. Edwards Stadium; Huntington, WV	ESPN+	L 20–27	18,723
October 5	2:00 p.m.	at Ball State	Scheumann Stadium; Muncie, IN	ESPN+	W 45–42	10,342
October 12	3:30 p.m.	Akron	Waldo Stadium; Kalamazoo, MI	ESPN+	W 34–24	19,507
October 19	3:30 p.m.	at Buffalo	University at Buffalo Stadium; Amherst, NY	ESPN+	W 48–41	18,487
October 26	3:30 p.m.	Kent State	Waldo Stadium; Kalamazoo, MI	ESPN+	W 52–21	23,537
November 6	7:00 p.m.	Northern Illinois	Waldo Stadium; Kalamazoo, MI	ESPN2	L 28–42	10,346
November 12	7:00 p.m.	at Bowling Green	Doyt Perry Stadium; Bowling Green, OH	ESPN2	L 13–31	1,156
November 19	7:30 p.m.	at Central Michigan	Kelly/Shorts Stadium; Mount Pleasant, MI (rivalry, Michigan MAC Trophy)	ESPN2	L 14–16	13,102
November 30	1:30 p.m.	Eastern Michigan	Waldo Stadium; Kalamazoo, MI (Michigan MAC Trophy)	ESPN+	W 26–18	11,263
December 14	9:00 p.m.	vs. South Alabama*	Cramton Bowl; Montgomery, AL (Salute to Veterans Bowl)	ESPN	L 23–30	12,021
*Non-conference game; Rankings from AP Poll and CFP Rankings released prior to game; All times are in Eastern time

== Game summaries ==
=== at Wisconsin ===
Game One – Western Michigan Broncos (0-0) at Wisconsin Badgers (0-0) – Game summary

Quarter	1	2	3	4	Total
Broncos	0	7	0	7	14
Badgers	0	10	3	15	28

at Camp Randall Stadium, Madison, Wisconsin

- Date: Friday August 30, 2024
- Game time: 8:00 p.m.
- Game weather: Cloudy 71 F; Wind: North West 6 mph
- Game attendance: 75,158
- Referee: Greg Sujack
- TV announcers (FS1): Tim Brando (play-by-play), Devin Gardner (analyst), and Josh Sims (sideline)

Game information

First quarter

No scoring

Second quarter

- WIS – Chez Mellusi 9-yard run (Nathanial Vakos kick), 11:48 Wisconsin 7–0 Drive: 16 plays, 93 yards, 6:29.
- WMU – Jalen Buckley 1-yard run (Palmer Domschke kick), 3:02 Tied 7–7 Drive: 16 plays, 78 yards, 8:40.
- WIS – Nathanial Vakos 33-yard field goal, 13:45. Wisconsin 10–7. Drive: 14 plays, 68 yards, 2:58.

Third quarter

- WIS – Nathanial Vakos 23-yard field goal, 7:56. Wisconsin 13–7. Drive: 14 plays, 59 yards, 6:55.

Fourth quarter

- WMU – Jalen Buckley 1-yard run (Palmer Domschke kick), 14:15 Western Michigan 14–13 Drive: 6 plays, 34 yards, 2:51.
- WIS – Tawee Walker 6-yard run (Trech Kekahuna pass from Tyler Van Dyke), 10:35 Wisconsin 21–14 Drive: 4 plays, 20 yards, 1:46.
- WIS – Tyler Van Dyke 6-yard run (Nathanial Vakos kick), 3:17 Wisconsin 28–14 Drive: 8 plays, 50 yards, 4:37.

Statistics	WMU	WISC
First downs	13	27
Total yards	261	388
Rushing yards	120	196
Passing yards	141	192
Passing: Comp–Att–Int	12-19-1	21-36-0
Time of possession	24:42	35:18

Team	Category	Player	Statistics
Western Michigan	Passing	Hayden Wolff	12/18, 141
Western Michigan	Rushing	Jalen Buckley	16-64, 2 TD
Western Michigan	Receiving	Malique Dieudonne	2-45
Wisconsin	Passing	Tyler Van Dyke	21/36, 192
Wisconsin	Rushing	Chez Mellusi	19-74, TD
Wisconsin	Receiving	Will Pauling	6-60

=== at Ohio State ===
Game Two – Western Michigan Broncos (0–1) vs No. 2 Ohio State Buckeyes (1–0) – Game summary

Quarter	1	2	3	4	Total
Broncos	0	0	0	0	0
No. 2 Buckeyes	21	14	14	7	56

at Ohio Stadium • Columbus, Ohio

- Date: September 7
- Game time: 7:30 p.m. EDT
- Game weather: Clear, 64 °F (18 °C)
- Game attendance: 102,665
- Referee: Jeffrey Servinski
- TV announcers (BTN): Jeff Levering (play-by-play), Jake Butt (analyst), and Brooke Fletcher (sideline reporter)

Game information

First quarter

- (11:04) OSU – TreVeyon Henderson 3-yard run (Jayden Fielding kick) (Drive: 6 plays, 55 yards, 2:35; Ohio State 7–0)
- (4:00) OSU – Jeremiah Smith 70-yard pass from Will Howard (Jayden Fielding kick) (Drive: 4 plays, 75 yards, 2:28; Ohio State 14–0)
- (1:02) OSU – Quinshon Judkins 23-yard run (Jayden Fielding kick) (Drive: 5 plays, 73 yards, 1:39; Ohio State 21–0)

Second quarter

- (8:28) OSU – Quinshon Judkins 23-yard run (Jayden Fielding kick) (Drive: 4 plays, 65 yards, 1:17; Ohio State 28–0)
- (4:20) OSU – Will Howard 6-yard run (Jayden Fielding kick) (Drive: 6 plays, 70 yards, 2:34; Ohio State 35–0)

Third quarter

- (6:44) OSU – TreVeyon Henderson 16-yard run (Jayden Fielding kick) (Drive: 6 plays, 40 yards, 3:15; Ohio State 42–0)
- (0:05) OSU – James Peoples 12-yard run (Jayden Fielding kick) (Drive: 8 plays, 81 yards, 4:13; Ohio State 49–0)

Fourth quarter

- (5:01) OSU – Bennett Christian 55-yard pass from Julian Sayin (Austin Snyder kick) (Drive: 4 plays, 64 yards, 2:05; Ohio State 56–0)

Statistics	WMU	OSU
First downs	6	30
Plays–yards	48–99	72–683
Rushes–yards	31–28	39–273
Passing yards	71	410
Passing: comp–att–int	8–17–0	25–33–0
Time of possession	25:24	34:36

Team	Category	Player	Statistics
Western Michigan	Passing	Hayden Wolff	8/15, 71 yards
Western Michigan	Rushing	Keshawn King	8 carries, 22 yards
Western Michigan	Receiving	Anthony Sambucci	3 receptions, 41 yards
Ohio State	Passing	Will Howard	18/26, 292 yards, 1 TD
Ohio State	Rushing	Quinshon Judkins	9 carries, 108 yards, 2 TD
Ohio State	Receiving	Jeremiah Smith	5 receptions, 119 yards, 1 TD

=== Bethune–Cookman (FCS) ===
Game Three – Bethune–Cookman Wildcats (FCS) (0–2) at Western Michigan Broncos (0–2) – Game summary

Quarter	1	2	3	4	Total
Wildcats (FCS)	0	14	7	10	31
Broncos	14	21	14	10	59

at Waldo Stadium • Kalamazoo, MI

- Date: September 14, 2024
- Game time: 6:30 p.m.
- Game weather: Sunny • Temperature: 85 °F (29 °C) • Wind: E 8 miles per hour (13 km/h)
- Game attendance: 23,476
- Referee: David Siegle
- TV: ESPN+

Game information

First quarter

- (14:43) WMU – Anthoyn Sambucci 54-yard pass from Hayden Wolff, Luka Zurak kick (Drive: 1 play, 54 yards, 0:17; Western Michigan 7–0)
- (2:52) WMU – Christopher Toudle 23-yard pass from Hayden Wolff, Luka Zurak kick (Drive: 4 plays, 65 yards, 1:43; Western Michigan 14–0)

Second quarter

- (13:48) WMU – Jaden Nixon 8-yard run, Luka Zurak kick (Drive: 5 plays, 55 yards, 1:54; Western Michigan 21–0)
- (8:48) WMU – Zahir Abdus-Salaam 8-yard run, Luka Zurak kick (Drive: 6 plays, 65 yards, 2:39; Western Michigan 28–0)
- (6:36) BCU – Cam Ransom 3-yard run, Cade Hechter kick (Drive: 6 plays, 75 yards, 2:12; Western Michigan 28–7)
- (0:59) WMU – Bugs Mortimer 38-yard pass from Hayden Wolff, Luka Zurak kick (Drive: 8 plays, 65 yards, 1:49; Western Michigan 35–7)
- (0:46) BCU – Darnell Deas 95-yard kickoff return, Cade Hechter kick (Western Michigan 35–14)

Third quarter

- (15:00) BCU – Darnell Deas 98-yard kickoff return, Cade Hechter kick (Western Michigan 35–21)
- (9:19) WMU – Jaden Nixon 37-yard run, Luka Zurak kick (Drive: 1 play, 37 yards, 0:08; Western Michigan 42–21)
- (4:33) WMU – Zahir Abdus-Salaam 1-yard run, Luka Zurak kick (Drive: 6 plays, 87 yards, 2:23; Western Michigan 49–21)

Fourth quarter

- (14:54) BCU – Cade Hechter 41-yard field goal (Drive: 12 plays, 52 yards, 4:39; Western Michigan 49–24)
- (11:03) WMU – Luka Zurak 20-yard field goal (Drive: 8 plays, 75 yards, 3:50; Western Michigan 52–24)
- (5:31) BCU – Cam Ransom 2-yard run, Cade Hechter kick (Drive: 10 plays, 75 yards, 5:32; Western Michigan 52–31)
- (2:39) WMU – Jamal Hailey 48-yard run, Luka Zurak kick (Drive: 5 plays, 76 yards, 2:52; Western Michigan 59–31)

Statistics	BCU	WMU
First downs	17	30
Total yards	255	677
Rushing yards	139	372
Passing yards	116	305
Passing: Comp–Att–Int	10–15-0	15–19–1
Time of possession	33:45	26:15

Team	Category	Player	Statistics
Bethune–Cookman	Passing	Cam Ransom	10/14, 116 yards
Bethune–Cookman	Rushing	Cam Ransom	20 carries, 44 yards, 2 TD
Bethune–Cookman	Receiving	Lorenzo Jenkins	1 reception, 44 yards
Western Michigan	Passing	Hayden Wolff	15/19, 305 yards, 3 TD, INT
Western Michigan	Rushing	Jaden Nixon	17 carries, 189 yards, 2 TD
Western Michigan	Receiving	Anthony Sambucci	4 receptions, 103 yards, TD

=== at Marshall ===
Game Four – Western Michigan Broncos (1–2) at Marshall Thundering Herd (1–2) – Game summary

Quarter	1	2	3	4	Total
Broncos	3	0	14	3	20
Thundering Herd	7	10	3	7	27

at Joan C. Edwards Stadium • Huntington, WV

- Date: September 28, 2024
- Game time: 3:30 p.m.
- Game weather: Rain • Temperature: 72 °F (22 °C)
- Game attendance: 18,723
- Referee: Greg Sujack
- TV announcers (ESPN+): Keith Morehouse (play-by-play) and Mark Martin (analyst)

Game information

First quarter

- (13:08) MRSH – Toby Payne 32 yard pass from Stone Earle, Rece Verhoff kick (Drive: 5 plays, 69 yards, 1:43; Marshall 7–0)
- (6:09) WMU – Luka Zaruk 45 yard field goal (Drive: 6 plays, 42 yards, 1:51; Marshall 7–3)

Second quarter

- (12:18) MRSH – Rece Verhoff 20 yard field goal (Drive: 16 plays, 77 yards, 8:48; Marshall 10–3)
- (2:41) MRSH – Carl Chester 7 yard pass from Stone Earle, Rece Verhoff kick (Drive: 6 plays, 86 yards, 1:51; Marshall 17–3)

Third quarter

- (10:41) WMU – Jaden Nixon 36 yard run, Luka Zaruk kick (Drive: 8 plays, 75 yards, 4:19; Marshall 17–10)
- (5:52) MRSH – Rece Verhoff 28 yard field goal (Drive: 12 plays, 58 yards, 4:51; Marshall 20–10)
- (0:53) WMU – Blake Bosma 3 yard pass from Hayden Wolff, Luka Zaruk kick (Drive: 9 plays, 75 yards, 4:59; Marshall 20–17)

Fourth quarter

- (12:47) WMU – Luka Zaruk 45 yard field goal (Drive: 4 plays, 6 yards, 1:58; Tied 20–20)
- (7:39) MRSH – Christian Fitzpatrick 34 yard pass from Stone Earle, Rece Verhoff kick (Drive: 3 plays, 70 yards, 1:03; Marshall 27–20)

Statistics	WMU	MRSH
First downs	21	20
Total yards	318	420
Rushing yards	192	243
Passing yards	126	177
Passing: Comp–Att–Int	15–28–0	15–25–0
Time of possession	31:29	28:31

Team	Category	Player	Statistics
Western Michigan	Passing	Hayden Wolff	15/28, 126 yards, TD
Western Michigan	Rushing	Jaden Nixon	23 carries, 146 yards, TD
Western Michigan	Receiving	Anthony Sambucci	4 receptions, 56 yards
Marshall	Passing	Stone Earle	15/25, 177 yards, 3 TD
Marshall	Rushing	A. J. Turner	9 carries, 124 yards
Marshall	Receiving	Elijah Metcalf	4 receptions, 52 yards

=== at Ball State ===
Game Five – Western Michigan Broncos (1–3) at Ball State Cardinals (1–3) – Game summary

Quarter	1	2	3	4	Total
Broncos	21	0	10	14	45
Cardinals	14	7	14	7	42

at Scheumann Stadium, Muncie, IN

- Date: Saturday October 5, 2024
- Game time: 2:00 p.m.
- Game weather: Sunny • Temperature: 76 °F (24 °C) • Wind: SE 9 miles per hour (14 km/h)
- Game attendance: 10,342
- Referee: Andrew Speciale
- TV announcers (ESPN+): Jason Ross Jr. (play-by-play) and Tyoka Jackson (analyst)

Game information

First quarter

- (8:39) WMU – Jaden Nixon 21-yard run, Luka Zurak kick (Drive: 9 plays, 85 yards, 4:18; Western Michigan 7–0)
- (7:43) WMU – Blake Bosma 10-yard pass from Hayden Wolff, Luka Zurak kick (Drive: 2 plays, 10 yards, 0:41; Western Michigan 14–0)
- (7:29) BALL – Malcolm Gillie 97-yard kickoff return, Jackson Courville kick (Western Michigan 14–7)
- (5:02) BALL – Ty Robinson 21-yard pass from Kadin Semonza, Jackson Courville kick (Drive: 4 plays, 95 yards, 1:30; Tied 14–14)
- (4:09) WMU – Jaden Nixon 57-yard run, Luka Zurak kick (Drive: 2 plays, 65 yards, 0:53; Western Michigan 21–14)

Second quarter

- (9:54) BALL – Cam Pickett 4-yard run, Jackson Courville kick (Drive: 15 plays, 83 yards, 9:10; Tied 21–21)

Third quarter

- (12:13) WMU – Malique Dieudonne 43-yard pass from Hayden Wolff, Luka Zurak kick (Drive: 6 plays, 69 yards, 2:41; Western Michigan 28–21)
- (9:50) BALL – Christian Abney 22-yard pass from Braedon Sloan, Jackson Courville kick (Drive: 5 plays, 66 yards, 2:15; Tied 28–28)
- (7:52) BALL – Drew Hughes 2-yard pass from Kadin Semonza, Jackson Courville kick (Drive: 4 plays, 28 yards, 1:52; Ball State 35–28)
- (0:21) WMU – Luka Zurak 39-yard field goal (Drive: 14 plays, 53 yards, 7:31; Ball State 35–31)

Fourth quarter

- (13:19) WMU – Jaden Nixon 23-yard run, Luka Zurak kick (Drive: 3 plays, 32 yards, 0:57; Western Michigan 38–35)
- (7:43) WMU – Anthony Sambucci 1-yard pass from Hayden Wolff, Luka Zurak kick (Drive: 7 plays, 65 yards, 3:32; Western Michigan 45–35)
- (1:47) BALL – Cam Pickett 27-yard pass from Kadin Semonza, Jackson Courville kick (Drive: 8 plays, 85 yards, 1:20; Western Michigan 45–42)

Statistics	WMU	BALL
First downs	23	23
Total yards	397	461
Rushing yards	197	68
Passing yards	264	329
Turnovers	1	3
Time of possession	32:30	27:30

Team	Category	Player	Statistics
Western Michigan	Passing	Hayden Wolff	26/29, 264 yards, 3 TD
Western Michigan	Rushing	Jaden Nixon	14 carries, 124 yards, 3 TD
Western Michigan	Receiving	Anthony Sambucci	9 receptions, 74 yards, TD
Ball State	Passing	Kadin Semonza	21/34, 307 yards, 3 TD, 2 INT
Ball State	Rushing	Braedon Sloan	18 carries, 65 yards
Ball State	Receiving	Tanner Koziol	9 receptions, 102 yards

=== Akron ===
Game Six – Akron Zips (1–5) at Western Michigan Broncos (2–3) – Game summary

Quarter	1	2	3	4	Total
Zips	10	7	7	0	24
Broncos	0	24	7	3	34

at Waldo Stadium • Kalamazoo, MI

- Date: October 12, 2024
- Game time: 3:30 p.m.
- Game weather: 0 °F (−18 °C)
- TV announcers (ESPN+): Shawn Kenney (play-by-play) and Charlie Strong (analyst)

Game information

First quarter

- (10:21) AKR – Garrison Smith 38-yard field goal (Drive: 5 plays, 63 yards, 2:02; Akron 3–0)
- (5:18) AKR – Tahj Bullock 2-yard run, Garrison Smith kick (Drive: 5 plays, 79 yards, 2:30; Akron 10–0)

Second quarter

- (14:16) AKR – Tahj Bullock 5-yard run, Garrison Smith kick (Drive: 4 plays, 69 yards, 1:33; Akron 17–0)
- (12:03) WMU – Josh Franklin 0-yard fumble return, Luka Zurak kick (Drive: 6 plays, 19 yards, 2:13; Akron 17–7)
- (5:17) WMU – Kenneth Womack 25-yard pass from Hayden Wolff, Luka Zurak kick (Drive: 4 plays, 58 yards, 1:44; Akron 17–14)
- (13:19) WMU – Broc Lowry 5-yard run, Luka Zurak kick (Drive: 3 plays, 35 yards, 1:08; Western Michigan 21–17)
- (0:00) WMU – Luka Zurak 39-yard field goal (Drive: 8 plays, 47 yards, 1:06; Western Michigan 24–17)

Third quarter

- (10:37) AKR – Jordon Simmons 4-yard run, Garrison Smith kick (Drive: 11 plays, 77 yards, 4:23; Tied 24–24)
- (4:02) WMU – Kaevion Mack 10-yard pass from Hayden Wolff (Luka Zurak kick) (Drive: 3 plays, 26 yards, 0:49; Western Michigan 31–24)

Fourth quarter

- (11:28) WMU – Luka Zurak 20-yard field goal (Drive: 6 plays, 70 yards, 3:21; Western Michigan 34–24)

Statistics	AKR	WMU
First downs	20	19
Plays–yards	68-501	66-387
Rushes–yards	27-88	39-196
Passing yards	413	191
Passing: comp–att–int	26-38-1	17-25-0
Time of possession	29:34	30:26

Team	Category	Player	Statistics
Akron	Passing	Ben Finley	24/36, 395 yards, INT
Akron	Rushing	Jordon Simmons	13 carries, 63 yards, TD
Akron	Receiving	Adrian Norton	8 receptions, 168 yards
Western Michigan	Passing	Hayden Wolff	17/25, 191 yards, 2 TD
Western Michigan	Rushing	Jalen Buckley	7 carries, 103 yards
Western Michigan	Receiving	Malique Dieudonne	3 receptions, 48 yards

=== at Buffalo ===
Game Seven – Western Michigan Broncos (3–3) at Buffalo Bulls (2–4) – Game summary

Quarter	1	2	3	4	Total
Broncos	7	21	7	13	48
Bulls	10	7	7	17	41

at UB Stadium, Amherst, NY

- Date: Saturday October 19, 2024
- Game time: 3:30 p.m.
- Game weather: Sunny, 66 °F (19 °C)
- Game attendance: 18,487
- Referee: Billy Williams
- TV announcers (ESPN+): Anthony Lima (play-by-play) and Je'Rod Cherry (analyst)

Game information

First quarter

- (13:38) BUF TD: Messiah Burch 7-yard run (Upton Bellenfant kick) BUF 7–0; 2 plays, 7 yards, 0:00
- (11:12) WMU TD: Blake Bosma 16-yard pass from Hayden Wolff (Luka Zurak kick) Tie 7–7; 6 plays, 75 yards, 2:26
- (08:32) BUF FG: Upton Bellenfant 26-yard field goal BUF 10–7; 7 plays, 61 yards, 2:40

Second quarter

- (13:38) WMU TD: Jaden Nixon 1-yard run (Luka Zurak kick) WMU 14–10; 10 plays, 69 yards, 0:43
- (08:49) WMU TD: Blake Bosma 14-yard pass from Hayden Wolff (Luka Zurak kick) WMU 21–10; 6 plays, 77 yards, 2:56
- (07:55) WMU TD: Blake Bosma 12-yard pass from Hayden Wolff (Luka Zurak kick) WMU 28–10; 3 plays, 13 yards, 0:48
- (03:22) BUF TD: Victor Snow 26-yard pass from C.J. Ogbonna (Upton Bellenfant kick) WMU 28–17; 9 plays, 71 yards, 4:26

Third quarter

- (08:21) WMU TD: Jaden Nixon 2-yard run (Luka Zurak kick) WMU 35–17; 9 plays, 76 yards, 4:25
- (05:47) BUF TD: Taji Johnson 11-yard pass from C.J. Ogbonna (Upton Bellenfant kick) WMU 35–24; 7 plays, 65 yards, 2:29

Fourth quarter

- (14:52) BUF TD: Victor Snow 12-yard run, pass failed WMU 35–30; 12 plays, 71 yards, 0:08
- (11:45) WMU FG: Luka Zurak 35-yard field goal WMU 38–30; 8 plays, 56 yards, 3:03
- (11:08) BUF TD: Al-Jay Henderson 68-yard run, two-point conversion pass Chance Morrow from C.J. Ogbonna Tie 38–38; 3 plays, 75 yards, 0:37
- (08:59) WMU FG: Luka Zurak 37-yard field goal WMU 41–38; 4 plays, 2 yards, 1:59
- (02:43) WMU TD: Jaden Nixon 54-yard run (Luka Zurak kick) WMU 48–38; 8 plays, 85 yards, 4:27
- (01:02) BUF FG: Upton Bellenfant 22-yard field goal WMU 48–41; 9 plays, 58 yards, 1:36

Statistics	WMU	UB
First downs	26	23
Plays–yards	74–489	73–551
Rushing yards	209	242
Passing yards	280	309
Passing: Comp–Att–Int	20–31–0	22–34–0
Time of possession	33:22	26:38

Team	Category	Player	Statistics
Western Michigan	Passing	Hayden Wolff	20/31, 280 yards, 3 TD
Western Michigan	Rushing	Jaden Nixon	14 carries, 112 yards, 3 TD
Western Michigan	Receiving	Blake Bosma	6 receptions, 85 yards, 3 TD
Buffalo	Passing	C. J. Ogbonna	22/34, 309 yards, 2 TD
Buffalo	Rushing	Al-Jay Henderson	12 carries, 97 yards, TD
Buffalo	Receiving	Victor Snow	7 receptions, 84 yards, TD

=== Kent State ===
Game Eight – Kent State Golden Flashes (0–7) at Western Michigan Broncos (4–3) – Game summary

Quarter	1	2	3	4	Total
Golden Flashes	0	7	0	14	21
Broncos	14	24	7	7	52

at Waldo Stadium • Kalamazoo, MI

- Date: Saturday October 26, 2024
- Game time: 3:30 p.m.
- Game weather: Sunny • Temperature: 56 °F (13 °C) • Wind: NW at 10 miles per hour (16 km/h)
- Game attendance: 23,537
- Referee: Andrew Speciale
- TV announcers (ESPN+): Shawn Kenney (play-by-play) and Charlie Strong (analyst)

Game information

First quarter

- (8:54) WMU – Malique Dieudonne 3-yard pass from Hayden Wolff, Luka Zurak kick (Drive: 11 plays, 83 yards, 6:06; Western Michigan 7–0)
- (4:55) WMU – Jaden Nixon 92-yard run, Luka Zurak kick (Drive: 1 play, 92 yards, 0:20; Western Michigan 14–0)

Second quarter

- (11:42) WMU – Luka Zurak 21-yard field goal (Drive: 7 plays, 53 yards, 3:30; Western Michigan 17–0)
- (8:55) WMU – Jalen Buckley 2-yard run, Luka Zurak kick (Drive: 4 plays, 52 yards, 1:48; Western Michigan 24–0)
- (5:21) WMU – Jalen Buckley 17-yard run, Luka Zurak kick (Drive: 3 plays, 48 yards, 1:39; Western Michigan 31–0)
- (3:54) WMU – Kaevion Mack 17-yard pass from Hayden Wolff, Luka Zurak kick (Drive: 2 plays, 19 yards, 0:40; Western Michigan 38–0)
- (0:10) KSU – Luke Floriea 18-yard pass from Tommy Ulatowski, Will Hryszko kick (Drive: 1 play, 33 yards, 0:13; Western Michigan 38–7)

Third quarter

- (1:04) WMU – Blake Bosma 10-yard pass from Hayden Wolff, Luka Zurak kick (Drive: 4 plays, 80 yards, 1:39; Western Michigan 45–7)

Fourth quarter

- (13:42) KSU – Jay Jay Etheridge 16-yard pass from Tommy Ulatowski, Will Hryszko kick (Drive: 6 plays, 61 yards, 2:22; Western Michigan 45–14)
- (1:04) WMU – Broc Lowry 14-yard run, Luka Zurak kick (Drive: 11 plays, 78 yards, 5:55; Western Michigan 52–14)
- (0:20) KSU – Conner Muldowney 7-yard pass from Tommy Ulatowski, Will Hryszko kick (Drive: 15 plays, 75 yards, 7:27; Western Michigan 52–21)

Statistics	KENT	WMU
First downs	19	23
Plays–yards	64–250	61–579
Rushes–yards	39–136	37–358
Passing yards	114	221
Passing: comp–att–int	12–25–2	17–24–1
Time of possession	30:15	29:45

Team	Category	Player	Statistics
Kent State	Passing	Tommy Ulatowski	12/24, 114 yards, 3 TD, 2 INT
Kent State	Rushing	Ky Thomas	15 carries, 62 yards
Kent State	Receiving	Luke Floriea	3 receptions, 43 yards, TD
Western Michigan	Passing	Hayden Wolff	15/21, 208 yards, 3 TD, INT
Western Michigan	Rushing	Jaden Nixon	8 carries, 135 yards, TD
Western Michigan	Receiving	Kenneth Womack	2 receptions, 68 yards

=== Northern Illinois ===
Game Nine – Northern Illinois Huskies (4–4) at Western Michigan Broncos (5–3) – Game summary

Quarter	1	2	3	4	Total
Huskies	0	21	21	0	42
Broncos	7	7	7	7	28

at Waldo Stadium • Kalamazoo, MI

- Date: Wednesday November 6, 2024
- Game time: 7:00 p.m.
- Game weather: 0 °F (−18 °C)
- TV announcers (ESPN2): Lowell Galindo (play-by-play) and Fozzy Whittaker (analyst)

Game information
First quarter
- WMU – Jaden Nixon 66-yard run (Luka Zurak kick), 9:18. Broncos 7–0. Drive: 2 plays, 65 yards, 0:47.

Second quarter

- NIU – Telly Johnson Jr. 6-yard run (Kanon Woodill kick), 13:56. Tied 7–7. Drive: 5 plays, 31 yards, 2:04.
- NIU – Tristen Tewes 7-yard pass from Ethan Hampton (Kanon Woodill kick), 6:05. Huskies 14–7. Drive: 8 plays, 86 yards, 4:30.
- WMU – Jaden Nixon 14-yard run (Luka Zurak kick), 1:54. Tied 14–14. Drive: 9 plays, 75 yards, 4:11.
- NIU – Gavin Williams 5-yard pass from Ethan Hampton (Kanon Woodill kick), 0:09. Huskies 21–14. Drive: 12 plays, 60 yards, 1:45.

Third quarter

- WMU – Broc Lowry 1-yard run (Luka Zurak kick), 12:33. Tied 21–21. Drive: 4 plays, 38 yards, 2:14.
- NIU – Cam Thompson 91-yard kickoff return (Kanon Woodill kick), 12:33. Huskies 28–21. Drive: 4 plays, 38 yards, 2:14.
- NIU – Gavin Williams 2-yard run (Kanon Woodill kick), 8:19. Huskies 35–21. Drive: 6 plays, 35 yards, 3:24.
- NIU – Telly Johnson Jr. 26-yard run (Kanon Woodill kick), 0:47. Huskies 42–21. Drive: 5 plays, 71 yards, 2:49.

Fourth quarter

- WMU – Mareyohn Hrabowski 10-yard pass from Hayden Wolff (Luka Zurak kick), 11:49. Huskies 42–28. Drive: 9 plays, 60 yards, 3:58.

Statistics	NIU	WMU
First downs	21	21
Total yards	411	390
Rushing yards	255	211
Passing yards	156	179
Passing: comp–att–int	13-17-0	14-28-3
Time of possession	29:24	30:36

Team	Category	Player	Statistics
Northern Illinois	Passing	Ethan Hampton	13/16, 156 yards, 2 TD
Northern Illinois	Rushing	Telly Johnson Jr.	23 carries, 141 yards, 2 TD
Northern Illinois	Receiving	Trayvon Rudolph	6 receptions, 74 yards
Western Michigan	Passing	Hayden Wolff	14/27, 179 yards, TD, 2 INT
Western Michigan	Rushing	Jaden Nixon	12 carries, 95 yards, 2 TD
Western Michigan	Receiving	Kenneth Womack	4 receptions, 51 yards

=== at Bowling Green ===
Game Ten – Western Michigan Broncos (5–4) at Bowling Green Falcons (5–4) – Game summary

Quarter	1	2	3	4	Total
Broncos	0	7	6	0	13
Falcons	3	14	14	0	31

at Doyt Perry Stadium, Bowling Green, OH

- Date: Tuesday November 12, 2024
- Game time: 7:00 p.m.
- Game weather: Clear • Temperature: 37 °F (3 °C) • Wind: NE 7 miles per hour (11 km/h)
- Game attendance: 1,156
- Referee: David Siegle
- TV announcers (ESPN2): Clay Matvick (play-by-play) and Steve Addazio (analyst)

Game information

First quarter

- (8:32) BGSU – Zach Long 50-yard field goal (Drive: 12 plays, 37 yards, 4:35; Bowling Green 3-0)

Second quarter

- (10:36) WMU – Jalen Buckley 6-yard run (Luka Zurak kick) (Drive: 13 plays, 87 yards, 8:02; Western Michigan 7-3)
- (5:12) BGSU – Harold Fannin Jr. 25-yard pass from Connor Bazelak (Zach Long kick) (Drive: 6 plays, 84 yards, 3:11; Bowling Green 10-7)
- (4:02) BGSU – Connor Bazelak 1-yard run (Zach Long kick) (Drive: 3 plays, 26 yards, 0:57; Bowling Green 17-7)

Third quarter

- (11:11) BGSU – Terion Stewart 17-yard run (Zach Long kick) (Drive: 7 plays, 65 yards, 3:49; Bowling Green 24-7)
- (6:38) BGSU – Harold Fannin Jr. 10-yard pass from Connor Bazelak (Drive: 3 plays, 74 yards, 1:25; Bowling Green 31-7)
- (0:27) WMU – Jalen Buckley 5-yard run (pass failed) (Drive: 12 plays, 63 yards, 6:03; Bowling Green 31-13)

Fourth quarter

- no scoring plays

Statistics	WMU	BGSU
First downs	19	19
Plays–yards	69–292	56–402
Rushing yards	97	226
Passing yards	195	176
Passing: Comp–Att–Int	24–33–2	15–23–0
Time of possession	33:23	26:37

Team	Category	Player	Statistics
Western Michigan	Passing	Hayden Wolff	24/32, 195 yards, 2 INT
Western Michigan	Rushing	Jalen Buckley	15 carries, 73 yards, 2 TD
Western Michigan	Receiving	Kenneth Womack	4 receptions, 62 yards
Bowling Green	Passing	Connor Bazelak	15/22, 176 yards, 2 TD
Bowling Green	Rushing	Terion Stewart	15 carries, 150 yards, TD
Bowling Green	Receiving	Harold Fannin Jr.	10 receptions, 137 yards, 2 TD

=== at Central Michigan (rivalry) ===
Game Eleven – Western Michigan Broncos (5–5) at Central Michigan Chippewas (3–7) – Game summary

Quarter	1	2	3	4	Total
Broncos	0	0	7	7	14
Chippewas	7	6	0	3	16

at Kelly/Shorts Stadium, Mount Pleasant, MI

- Date: Tuesday November 19, 2024
- Game time: 7:30 p.m.
- Game weather: Cloudy • Temperature: 54 °F (12 °C) • Wind: SE 3 miles per hour (4.8 km/h)
- Game attendance: 13,102
- Referee: Rich Edwards
- TV announcers (ESPN2): Noah Reed (play-by-play), Craig Haubert (analyst) and Scott Ferrier (sideline)

Game information
First quarter
- CMU – Harris, B.J. 6 yd run (Mattson, Tristan kick), 3 plays, 70 yards, TOP 01:33. CMU 7–0.

Second quarter

- CMU – Mattson, Tristan 36 yd field goal, 11 plays, 74 yards, TOP 06:00. CMU 10–0.
- CMU – Mattson, Tristan 47 yd field goal, 5 plays, 28 yards, TOP 00:55. CMU 13–0.

Third quarter

- WMU – Hallock, Tate 78 yd interception return (Zurak, Luka kick). CMU 13–7.

Fourth quarter

- CMU – Mattson, Tristan 30 yd field goal, 17 plays, 50 yards, TOP 10:17. CMU 16–7.
- WMU – Buckley, Jalen 1 yd run (Zurak, Luka kick), 14 plays, 76 yards, TOP 07:34. CMU 16–14.

Statistics	WMU	CMU
First downs	10	16
Plays–yards	51–184	66–307
Rushing yards	50	167
Passing yards	134	140
Passing: Comp–Att–Int	15–26–0	8–17–1
Time of possession	23:43	36:17

Team	Category	Player	Statistics
Western Michigan	Passing	Hayden Wolff	13/23, 126 yards
Western Michigan	Rushing	Jalen Buckley	12 carries, 50 yards, TD
Western Michigan	Receiving	Kenneth Womack	4 receptions, 47 yards
Central Michigan	Passing	Jadyn Glasser	8/17, 140 yards, INT
Central Michigan	Rushing	Marion Lukes	15 carries, 93 yards
Central Michigan	Receiving	Solomon Davis	3 receptions, 73 yards

=== Eastern Michigan ===
Game Twelve – Eastern Michigan Eagles (5–6) at Western Michigan Broncos (5–6) – Game summary

Quarter	1	2	3	4	Total
Eagles	0	0	15	3	18
Broncos	0	16	7	3	26

at Waldo Stadium • Kalamazoo, MI

- Date: Saturday November 30, 2024
- Game time: 1:30 p.m.
- Game weather: 0 °F (−18 °C)
- TV announcers (ESPN+): Michael Reghi (play-by-play) and Ryan Cavanaugh (analyst)

Game information

First quarter

- No scoring plays

Second quarter

- (3:41) WMU – Team safety (Western Michigan 2–0)
- (1:50) WMU – Zahir Abdus-Salaam 31-yard pass from Hayden Wolff (Luka Zurak kick) (Western Michigan 9–0)
- (0:19) WMU – Jalen Buckley 15-yard run (Luka Zurak kick) (Western Michigan 16–0)

Third quarter

- (12:02) EMU – Delbert Mimms III 10-yard run (Cole Snyder pass to Max Reese for 2-point conversion) (Western Michigan 16–8)
- (6:04) WMU – Zahir Abdus-Salaam 22-yard run (Luka Zurak kick) (Western Michigan 23–8)
- (2:16) EMU – Delbert Mimms III 1-yard run (Jesus Gomez kick) (Western Michigan 23–15)

Fourth quarter

- (11:33) WMU – Luka Zurak 25-yard field goal (Western Michigan 26–15)
- (11:28) EMU – Jesus Gomez 32-yard field goal (Western Michigan 26–18)

Statistics	EMU	WMU
First downs	15	20
Total yards	294	356
Rushing yards	203	230
Passing yards	91	126
Passing: comp–att–int	7-22-1	12-17-0
Time of possession	24:01	35:59

Team	Category	Player	Statistics
Eastern Michigan	Passing	Cole Snyder	7/22, 91 yards, INT
Eastern Michigan	Rushing	Delbert Mimms III	18 carries, 127 yards, 2 TD
Eastern Michigan	Receiving	Markus Allen	3 receptions, 59 yards
Western Michigan	Passing	Hayden Wolff	12/17, 126 yards, TD
Western Michigan	Rushing	Zahir Abdus-Salaam	19 carries, 135 yards, TD
Western Michigan	Receiving	Zahir Abdus-Salaam	3 receptions, 40 yards, TD

=== South Alabama (Salute to Veterans Bowl) ===
2024 IS4S Salute to Veterans Bowl
South Alabama Jaguars (6-6, 5-3) at Western Michigan Broncos (6-6, 5-3)

Quarter	1	2	3	4	Total
Jaguars	0	16	7	7	30
Broncos	7	6	0	10	23

at Cramton Bowl, Montgomery, Alabama

- Date: December 14, 2024
- Game time: 9:00 p.m. EST
- Game weather: Overcast • Temperature: 63 °F (17 °C) • Wind: ESE 11 mph
- Game attendance: 12,021
- Referee: Cal McNeill
- TV announcers (ESPN): Wes Durham (play-by-play), Tom Luginbill (analyst), and Dana Boyle (sideline)

Game information

First Quarter

- (10:31) WMU – Jalen Buckley 1 yard rush, Luka Zurak kick (Drive: 5 plays, 71 yards, 2:36; Western Michigan 7–0)

Second Quarter

- (14:50) WMU – Luke Zurak 37 yard field goal (Drive: 12 plays, 61 yards, 6:23; Western Michigan 10–0)
- (12:15) USA – Hamilton DiBoyan 24 yard field goal (Drive: 9 plays, 69 yards, 2:35; Western Michigan 10–3)
- (10:29) USA – Jeremiah Webb 52 yard pass from Bishop Davenport, Hamilton DiBoyan kick (Drive: 2 plays, 80 yards, 0:35; Tied 10–10)
- (4:50) USA – Jeremiah Webb 45 yard pass from Bishop Davenport, Hamilton DiBoyan kick no good (Drive: 9 plays, 80 yards, 4:06; South Alabama 16–10)
- (0:13) WMU – Luka Zurak 29 yard field goal (Drive: 5 plays, 11 yards, 1:12; South Alabama 16–13)

Third Quarter

- (4:18) USA – Bishop Davenport 50 yard rush, Hamilton DiBoyan kick (Drive: 8 plays, 90 yards, 4:04; South Alabama 23–13)

Fourth Quarter

- (6:17) WMU – Anthony Sambucci 7 yard pass from Hayden Wolff, Luka Zurak kick (Drive: 9 plays, 75 yards, 5:07; South Alabama 23–20)
- (2:42) USA – Kentrel Bullock 22 yard rush, Hamilton DiBoyan kick (Drive: 8 plays, 75 yards, 3:35; South Alabama 30–20)
- (1:11) WMU – Luka Zurak 48 yard field goal (Drive: 8 plays, 40 yards, 1:31; South Alabama 30–23)

Statistics	USA	WMU
First downs	25	21
Total yards	537	317
Rushing yards	266	121
Passing yards	271	196
Passing: Comp–Att–Int	15–24–1	17–27–1
Time of possession	27:56	32:04

Team	Category	Player	Statistics
South Alabama	Passing	Bishop Davenport	15/24, 271 yards, 2 TD, INT
South Alabama	Rushing	Kentrel Bullock	17 carries, 130 yards, TD
South Alabama	Receiving	Jeremiah Webb	6 receptions, 182 yards, 2 TD
Western Michigan	Passing	Hayden Wolff	17/27, 196 yards, TD, INT
Western Michigan	Rushing	Jaden Nixon	11 carries, 45 yards
Western Michigan	Receiving	Kenneth Womack	5 receptions, 89 yards
