= 2024 Akron Zips football team =

American college football season

2024 Akron Zips football
- Conference: Mid-American Conference
- Record: 4–8 (3–5 MAC)
- Head coach: Joe Moorhead (3rd season)
- Offensive scheme: Up-tempo spread
- Defensive coordinator: Tim Tibesar (3rd season)
- Base defense: Multiple 4–2–5
- Home stadium: InfoCision Stadium–Summa Field

2024 Mid-American Conference football standings
	Conf.			Overall
Team	W		L	W		L
Ohio y$	7	–	1	11	–	3
Miami (OH) y	7	–	1	9	–	5
Buffalo	6	–	2	9	–	4
Bowling Green	6	–	2	7	–	6
Western Michigan	5	–	3	6	–	7
Toledo	4	–	4	8	–	5
Northern Illinois	4	–	4	8	–	5
Akron	3	–	5	4	–	8
Eastern Michigan	2	–	6	5	–	7
Central Michigan	2	–	6	4	–	8
Ball State	2	–	6	3	–	9
Kent State	0	–	8	0	–	12
Championship: Ohio 38, Miami (OH) 3
$ – Conference champion; y – Championship game participant

The 2024 Akron Zips football team represented the University of Akron in the Mid-American Conference during the 2024 NCAA Division I FBS football season. The Zips were led by Joe Moorhead in his third year as the head coach. The Zips played their home games at InfoCision Stadium, located in Akron, Ohio.

== Preseason ==
=== Preseason polls ===
On July 19 the MAC announced the preseason coaches poll. Akron was picked to finish 11th in the conference. The Zips received zero votes to win the MAC Championship.

== Schedule ==
Date	Time	Opponent	Site	TV	Result	Attendance
August 31	3:30 p.m.	at No. 2 Ohio State*	Ohio Stadium; Columbus, OH	CBS	L 6–52	102,011
September 7	12:00 p.m.	at Rutgers*	SHI Stadium; Piscataway, NJ	BTN	L 17–49	41,021
September 14	6:00 p.m.	Colgate*	InfoCision Stadium; Akron, OH	ESPN+	W 31–20	8,932
September 21	7:30 p.m.	at South Carolina*	Williams–Brice Stadium; Columbia, SC	ESPNU	L 7–50	78,704
September 28	3:30 p.m.	at Ohio	Peden Stadium; Athens, OH	ESPN+	L 10–30	21,265
October 5	3:30 p.m.	Bowling Green^{†}	InfoCision Stadium; Akron, OH	ESPN+	L 20–27	9,337
October 12	3:30 p.m.	at Western Michigan	Waldo Stadium; Kalamazoo, MI	ESPN+	L 24–34	19,507
October 26	3:30 p.m.	Eastern Michigan	InfoCision Stadium; Akron, OH	ESPN+	W 25–21	4,277
November 2	12:00 p.m.	Buffalo	InfoCision Stadium; Akron, OH	CBSSN	L 30–41	4,610
November 13	7:00 p.m.	at Northern Illinois	Huskie Stadium; DeKalb, IL	CBSSN	L 16–29	6,795
November 19	7:00 p.m.	at Kent State	Dix Stadium; Kent, OH (Wagon Wheel)	CBSSN	W 38–17	6,768
November 26	7:00 p.m.	Toledo	InfoCision Stadium; Akron, OH	ESPN2	W 21–14 ^{OT}	4,716
*Non-conference game; ^{†}Homecoming; Rankings from AP Poll and CFP Rankings released prior to game; All times are in Eastern time

== Game summaries ==
=== at No. 2 Ohio State ===
Akron Zips (0–0) at No. 2 Ohio State Buckeyes (0–0) – Game summary

Quarter	1	2	3	4	Total
Zips	3	0	3	0	6
No. 2 Buckeyes	7	10	21	14	52

at Ohio Stadium • Columbus, Ohio

- Date: August 31
- Game time: 3:30 p.m. EDT
- Game weather: Cloudy, 80 °F (27 °C)
- Game attendance: 102,011
- Referee: Tim O'Dey
- TV announcers (CBS): Brad Nessler (play-by-play), Gary Danielson (analyst), and Jenny Dell (sideline reporter)

Game information

First quarter

- (8:44) AKR – Garrison Smith 48-yard field goal (Drive: 10 plays, 47 yards, 5:18; Akron 3–0)
- (2:44) OSU – Jeremiah Smith 16-yard pass from Will Howard (Jayden Fielding kick) (Drive: 14 plays, 75 yards, 6:00; Ohio State 7–3)

Second quarter

- (11:23) OSU – Jayden Fielding 40-yard field goal (Drive: 5 plays, 11 yards, 0:40; Ohio State 10–3)
- (4:30) OSU – Jeremiah Smith 9-yard pass from Will Howard (Jayden Fielding kick) (Drive: 9 plays, 76 yards, 4:30; Ohio State 17–3)

Third quarter

- (7:53) OSU – Quinshon Judkins 2-yard run (Jayden Fielding kick) (Drive: 3 plays, 60 yards, 0:52; Ohio State 24–3)
- (7:35) OSU – Lathan Ransom 27-yard fumble return (Jayden Fielding kick) (Ohio State 31–3)
- (3:57) AKR – Garrison Smith 49-yard field goal (Drive: 7 plays, 44 yards, 3:38; Ohio State 31–6)
- (0:01) OSU – James Peoples 4-yard run (Jayden Fielding kick) (Drive: 8 plays, 75 yards, 3:56; Ohio State 38–6)

Fourth quarter

- (10:16) OSU – Carnell Tate 34-yard pass from Will Howard (Jayden Fielding kick) (Drive: 4 plays, 47 yards, 1:53; Ohio State 45–6)
- (2:25) OSU – Gabe Powers 29-yard interception return (Jayden Fielding kick) (Ohio State 52–6)

Statistics	AKR	OSU
First downs	11	24
Plays–yards	64–177	64–404
Rushes–yards	35–47	33–170
Passing yards	130	234
Passing: comp–att–int	18–29–2	18–31–0
Time of possession	34:03	25:57

Team	Category	Player	Statistics
Akron	Passing	Tahj Bullock	9/13, 68 yards
Akron	Rushing	Tahj Bullock	14 carries, 42 yards
Akron	Receiving	Jake Newell	2 receptions, 41 yards
Ohio State	Passing	Will Howard	17/28, 228 yards, 3 TD
Ohio State	Rushing	TreVeyon Henderson	8 carries, 65 yards
Ohio State	Receiving	Jeremiah Smith	6 receptions, 92 yards, 2 TD

=== at Rutgers ===
Akron Zips (0–1) at Rutgers Scarlet Knights (1–0) – Game summary

Quarter	1	2	3	4	Total
Zips	0	3	7	7	17
Scarlet Knights	7	14	14	14	49

at SHI Stadium • Piscataway, New Jersey

- Date: September 7
- Game time: 12:00 p.m. EDT
- Game weather: Cloudy • Temperature: 76 °F (24 °C) • Wind: SW 7mph
- Game attendance: 41,021
- Referee: Bryan Banks
- TV announcers (BTN): Jason Horowitz (play-by-play), Matt Millen (analyst), and Taryn Hatcher (sideline reporter)

Game information

First quarter

- (0:47) RU – Kyle Monangai 3-yard run, Jai Patel kick (Drive: 6 plays, 76 yards, 2:48; Rutgers 7–0)

Second quarter

- (6:06) AKR – Garrison Smith 41-yard field goal (Drive: 8 plays, 37 yards, 4:03; Rutgers 7–3)
- (1:54) RU – KJ Duff 6-yard pass from Athan Kaliakmanis, Jai Patel kick (Drive: 7 plays, 75 yards, 4:12; Rutgers 14–3)
- (0:09) RU – Kyle Monangai 1-yard run, Jai Patel kick (Drive: 9 plays, 80 yards, 1:10; Rutgers 21–3)

Third quarter

- (11:45) AKR – Adrian Norton 32-yard pass from Ben Finley, Garrison Smith kick (Drive: 8 plays, 75 yards, 3:15; Rutgers 21–10)
- (4:56) RU – Kyle Monangai 2-yard run, Jai Patel kick (Drive: 12 plays, 75 yards, 6:49; Rutgers 28–10)
- (3:14) RU – Chris Long 58-yard pass from Athan Kaliakmanis, Jai Patel kick (Drive: 2 plays, 62 yards, 0:46; Rutgers 35–10)

Fourth quarter

- (13:25) RU – Kenny Fletcher 9-yard pass from Athan Kaliakmanis, Jai Patel kick (Drive: 6 plays, 74 yards, 3:45; Rutgers 42–10)
- (11:24) RU – Antwan Raymond 1-yard run, Jai Patel kick (Drive: 2 plays, 4 yards, 0:06; Rutgers 49–10)
- (10:11) AKR – Jordon Simmons 73-yard run, Garrison Smith kick (Drive: 3 plays, 78 yards, 0:42; Rutgers 49–17)

Statistics	AKR	RUTG
First downs	15	26
Plays–yards	59–307	67–515
Rushes–yards	25–156	44–285
Passing yards	151	230
Passing: comp–att–int	17–34–1	14–23–1
Time of possession	27:30	32:30

Team	Category	Player	Statistics
Akron	Passing	Ben Finley	14/31, 138 yards, 1 TD, 1 INT
Akron	Rushing	Jordon Simmons	9 carries, 109 yards, 1 TD
Akron	Receiving	Adrian Norton	3 receptions, 55 yards, 1 TD
Rutgers	Passing	Athan Kaliakmanis	14/23, 230 yards, 3 TD, 1 INT
Rutgers	Rushing	Kyle Monangai	27 carries, 208 yards, 3 TD
Rutgers	Receiving	Chris Long	4 receptions, 87 yards, 1 TD

=== Colgate (FCS) ===
Colgate Raiders (FCS) (0–2) at Akron Zips (0–2) – Game summary

Quarter	1	2	3	4	Total
Raiders (FCS)	17	0	3	0	20
Zips	7	21	0	3	31

at InfoCision Stadium • Akron, OH

- Date: September 14, 2024
- Game time: 6:00 p.m.
- Game weather: 0 °F (−18 °C)
- Game attendance: 8,932
- TV announcers (ESPN+): Anthony Lima (play-by-play) and Ryan Cavanaugh (analyst)

Game information

First quarter
Second quarter
Third quarter
Fourth quarter

Statistics	COLG	AKR
First downs	13	24
Plays–yards	62-243	75-416
Rushes–yards	30-84	31-51
Passing yards	159	365
Passing: comp–att–int	19-32-1	29-44-1
Time of possession	29:02	30:58

Team	Category	Player	Statistics
Colgate	Passing	Michael Brescia	9-17 95 Yards 1 TD
Colgate	Rushing	Michael Brescia	14 Carries 60 Yards 1 TD
Colgate	Receiving	Treyvhon Sanders	7 Receptions 82 Yards 1 TD
Akron	Passing	Ben Finley	28-43 358 Yards 4 TD 1 INT
Akron	Rushing	Jordon Simmons	9 Carries 49 Yards
Akron	Receiving	Adrian Norton	5 Receptions 125 Yards 1 TD

=== at South Carolina ===
Akron Zips (1–2) at South Carolina Gamecocks (2–1) – Game summary

Quarter	1	2	3	4	Total
Zips	0	7	0	0	7
Gamecocks	15	7	7	21	50

at Williams–Brice Stadium • Columbia, SC

- Date: September 21, 2024
- Game time: 7:30 p.m.
- Game weather: Clear • Temperature: 81 °F (27 °C) • Wind: SSE at 3 miles per hour (4.8 km/h)
- Game attendance: 78,704
- Referee: Jeff Heaser
- TV announcers (ESPNU): Clay Matvick (play-by-play) and Steve Addazio (analyst)

Game information

First quarter

- (5:19) USC – Oscar Adaway III 2-yard run (Alex Herrera kick) (Drive: 13 plays, 89 yards, 5:38; USC 7–0)
- (0:53) USC – Mazeo Bennett Jr. 30-yard pass from Robby Ashford (Kai Kroeger Run for Two-Point Conversion) (Drive: 7 plays, 85 yards, 3:02; USC 15–0)

Second quarter

- (4:28) USC – Juju McDowell 12-yard pass from Robby Ashford (Alex Herrera kick) (Drive: 11 plays, 80 yards, 4:57; USC 22–0)
- (1:53) AKR – Adrian Norton 42-yard pass from Ben Finley (Garrison Smith kick) (Drive: 6 plays, 70 yards, 2:31; USC 22–7)

Third quarter

- (5:02) USC – Oscar Adaway III 2-yard run (Alex Herrera kick) (Drive: 7 plays, 84 yards, 3:43; USC 29–7)

Fourth quarter

- (13:14) USC – Robby Ashford 36-yard run (Alex Herrera kick) (Drive: 5 plays, 71 yards, 1:59; USC 36-7)
- (8:14) USC – Connor Cox 9-yard pass from Davis Beville (Alex Herrera kick) (Drive: 12 plays, 46 yards, 4:44; USC 43-7)
- (4:03) USC – Jawarn Howell 23-yard run (Alex Herrera kick) (Drive: 4 plays, 37 yards, 1:49; USC 50-7)

Statistics	AKR	SCAR
First downs	9	27
Plays–yards	51–154	80–549
Rushes–yards	21–37	53–273
Passing yards	117	276
Passing: comp–att–int	16–30–1	19–27–0
Time of possession	23:57	36:03

Team	Category	Player	Statistics
Akron	Passing	Ben Finley	14/27, 110 yards, 1 TD, 1 INT
Akron	Rushing	Jordan Simmons	6 carries, 19 yards
Akron	Receiving	Adrian Norton	4 receptions, 56 yards, 1 TD
South Carolina	Passing	Robby Ashford	15/21, 243 yards, 2 TD
South Carolina	Rushing	Robby Ashford	16 carries, 133 yards, 1 TD
South Carolina	Receiving	Gage Larvadain	2 receptions, 79 yards

=== at Ohio ===
Akron Zips (1–3) at Ohio Bobcats (2–2) – Game summary

Quarter	1	2	3	4	Total
Zips	3	7	0	0	10
Bobcats	0	14	2	14	30

at Peden Stadium • Athens, OH

- Date: September 28, 2024
- Game time: 3:30 p.m.
- Game weather: Sunny • Temperature: 75 °F (24 °C)
- Game attendance: 21,265
- Referee: Andrew Speciale
- TV announcers (ESPN+): Michael Reghi (play-by-play) and Marcus Ray (analyst)

Game information

First quarter

- (6:42) AKR – Garrison Smith 30-yard field goal, Drive: 11 plays, 49 yards, 5:38; AKR 3–0

Second quarter

- (6:32) OHIO – Mason Williams 0-yard run (Gianni Spetic kick), Drive: 4 plays, 42 yards, 2:02; OHIO 7–3
- (1:20) AKR – Jake Newell 18-yard pass from Ben Finley (Garrison Smith kick), Drive: 3 plays, 31 yards, 0:40; AKR 10–7
- (0:17) OHIO – Coleman Owen 17-yard pass from Parker Navarro (Gianni Spetic kick), Drive: 7 plays, 75 yards, 1:03; OHIO 14–10

Third quarter

- (5:24) OHIO – 'Marcel Walker-Burgess 0-yard Safety OHIO 16–10

Fourth quarter

- (11:51) OHIO – Coleman Owen 75-yard pass from Parker Navarro (Gianni Spetic kick), Drive: 2 plays, 73 yards, 0:42; OHIO 23–10
- (0:59) OHIO – Parker Navarro 0-yard run (Gianni Spetic kick), Drive: 10 plays, 85 yards, 5:30; OHIO 30–10

Statistics	AKR	OHIO
First downs	14	21
Plays–yards	58–178	69–440
Rushes–yards	20–-18	51–236
Passing yards	196	204
Passing: comp–att–int	25–38–2	12–18–0
Time of possession	25:33	34:27

Team	Category	Player	Statistics
Akron	Passing	Ben Finley	25/38, 196 yards, TD, 2 INT
Akron	Rushing	Charles Kellorn	4 carries, 12 yards
Akron	Receiving	Adrian Norton	5 receptions, 59 yards
Ohio	Passing	Parker Navarro	12/18, 204 yards, 2 TD
Ohio	Rushing	Parker Navarro	13 carries, 113 yards, TD
Ohio	Receiving	Coleman Owen	6 receptions, 130 yards, 2 TD

=== Bowling Green ===
Bowling Green Falcons (1–3) at Akron Zips (1–4) – Game summary

Quarter	1	2	3	4	Total
Falcons	7	10	0	10	27
Zips	10	0	0	10	20

at InfoCision Stadium • Akron, OH

- Date: October 5, 2024
- Game time: 3:30 p.m.
- Game weather: Sunny • Temperature: 76 °F (24 °C)
- Game attendance: 9,337
- Referee: Jeremy Valentine
- TV announcers (ESPN+): Anthony Lima (play-by-play) and Ryan Cavanaugh (analyst)

Game information

First quarter

- (7:03) BGSU – Jaison Patterson 2-yard run, Jackson Kleather kick (Drive: 5 plays, 96 yards, 2:42; BGSU 7–0)
- (4:31) AKR – Garrison Smith 47-yard field goal (Drive: 6 plays, 45 yards, 2:32; BGSU 7–3)
- (0:00) AKR – Liam Reardon recovered fumbled punt in end zone, Garrison Smith kick (AKR 10–7)

Second quarter

- (1:55) BGSU – Jackson Kleather 45-yard field goal (Drive: 16 plays, 64 yards, 8:12; Tied 10–10)
- (0:22) BGSU – Jaison Patterson 9-yard run, Jackson Kleather kick (Drive: 5 plays, 41 yards, 1:11; BGSU 17–10)

Third quarter

No scoring plays

Fourth quarter

- (14:56) BGSU – Jackson Kleather 31-yard field goal (Drive: 13 plays, 85 yards, 7:39; BGSU 20–10)
- (13:13) AKR – Tahj Bullock 5-yard run, Garrison Smith kick (Drive: 3 plays, 75 yards, 1:43; BGSU 20–17)
- (7:13) AKR – Garrison Smith 38-yard field goal (Drive: 8 plays, 59 yards, 4:20; Tied 20–20)
- (2:39) BGSU – Harold Fannin Jr. 31-yard run, Jackson Kleather kick (Drive: 11 plays, 70 yards, 4:27; BGSU 27–20)

Statistics	BGSU	AKR
First downs	20	15
Plays–yards	66–386	54–321
Rushes–yards	36–118	22–115
Passing yards	268	206
Passing: comp–att–int	24–30–0	21–32–0
Time of possession	34:58	25:02

Team	Category	Player	Statistics
Bowling Green	Passing	Connor Bazelak	24/30, 268 yards
Bowling Green	Rushing	Jaison Patterson	18 carries, 52 yards, 2 TD
Bowling Green	Receiving	Harold Fannin Jr.	9 receptions, 135 yards
Akron	Passing	Ben Finley	21/32, 206 yards
Akron	Rushing	Jordan Simmons	9 carries, 73 yards
Akron	Receiving	Adrian Norton	3 receptions, 78 yards

=== at Western Michigan ===
Akron Zips (1–5) at Western Michigan Broncos (2–3) – Game summary

Quarter	1	2	3	4	Total
Zips	10	7	7	0	24
Broncos	0	24	7	3	34

at Waldo Stadium • Kalamazoo, MI

- Date: October 12, 2024
- Game time: 3:30 p.m.
- Game weather: 0 °F (−18 °C)
- TV announcers (ESPN+): Shawn Kenney (play-by-play) and Charlie Strong (analyst)

Game information

First quarter

- (10:21) AKR – Garrison Smith 38-yard field goal (Drive: 5 plays, 63 yards, 2:02; Akron 3–0)
- (5:18) AKR – Tahj Bullock 2-yard run, Garrison Smith kick (Drive: 5 plays, 79 yards, 2:30; Akron 10–0)

Second quarter

- (14:16) AKR – Tahj Bullock 5-yard run, Garrison Smith kick (Drive: 4 plays, 69 yards, 1:33; Akron 17–0)
- (12:03) WMU – Josh Franklin 0-yard fumble return, Luka Zurak kick (Drive: 6 plays, 19 yards, 2:13; Akron 17–7)
- (5:17) WMU – Kenneth Womack 25-yard pass from Hayden Wolff, Luka Zurak kick (Drive: 4 plays, 58 yards, 1:44; Akron 17–14)
- (13:19) WMU – Broc Lowry 5-yard run, Luka Zurak kick (Drive: 3 plays, 35 yards, 1:08; Western Michigan 21–17)
- (0:00) WMU – Luka Zurak 39-yard field goal (Drive: 8 plays, 47 yards, 1:06; Western Michigan 24–17)

Third quarter

- (10:37) AKR – Jordon Simmons 4-yard run, Garrison Smith kick (Drive: 11 plays, 77 yards, 4:23; Tied 24–24)
- (4:02) WMU – Kaevion Mack 10-yard pass from Hayden Wolff (Luka Zurak kick) (Drive: 3 plays, 26 yards, 0:49; Western Michigan 31–24)

Fourth quarter

- (11:28) WMU – Luka Zurak 20-yard field goal (Drive: 6 plays, 70 yards, 3:21; Western Michigan 34–24)

Statistics	AKR	WMU
First downs	20	19
Plays–yards	68-501	66-387
Rushes–yards	27-88	39-196
Passing yards	413	191
Passing: comp–att–int	26-38-1	17-25-0
Time of possession	29:34	30:26

Team	Category	Player	Statistics
Akron	Passing	Ben Finley	24/36, 395 yards, INT
Akron	Rushing	Jordon Simmons	13 carries, 63 yards, TD
Akron	Receiving	Adrian Norton	8 receptions, 168 yards
Western Michigan	Passing	Hayden Wolff	17/25, 191 yards, 2 TD
Western Michigan	Rushing	Jalen Buckley	7 carries, 103 yards
Western Michigan	Receiving	Malique Dieudonne	3 receptions, 48 yards

=== Eastern Michigan ===
Eastern Michigan Eagles (5–2) at Akron Zips (1–6) – Game summary

Quarter	1	2	3	4	Total
Eagles	0	0	14	7	21
Zips	8	10	0	7	25

at InfoCision Stadium • Akron, OH

- Date: October 26, 2024
- Game time: 3:30 p.m.
- Game weather: 0 °F (−18 °C)
- TV announcers (ESPN+): Anthony Lima (play-by-play) and Ryan Cavanaugh (analyst)

Game information

First quarter

- AKR – Tahj Bullock 3-yard run (Tahj Bullock pass to Liam Reardon for 2-point conversion), 2:54. Akron 8–0. Drive: 7 plays, 36 yards, 3:27.

Second quarter

- AKR – Garrison Smith 34-yard field goal, 14:09. Akron 11–0. Drive: 6 plays, 45 yards, 2:15.
- AKR – Tahj Bullock 14-yard run (Garrison Smith kick), 2:45. Akron 18–0. Drive: 7 plays, 71 yards, 3:28.

Third quarter

- EMU – Jere Getzinger 2-yard pass from Cole Snyder (Cole Snyder pass to Max Reese for 2-point conversion), 6:15. Akron 18-8. Drive: 14 plays, 65 yards, 5:24.
- EMU – Jere Getzinger 18-yard pass from Cole Snyder (PAT failed), 0:31. Akron 18–14. Drive: 9 plays, 73 yards, 3:42.

Fourth quarter

- EMU – Delbert Mimms III 1-yard run (Jesus Gomez kick), 7:41. Eastern Michigan 21–18. Drive: 12 plays, 99 yards, 5:30.
- AKR – Adrian Norton 21-yard pass from Ben Finley (Garrison Smith kick), 3:59. Akron 25–21. Drive: 11 plays, 75 yards, 3:42.

Statistics	EMU	AKR
First downs	23	20
Total yards	475	377
Rushing yards	121	220
Passing yards	354	157
Passing: Comp–Att–Int	29-48-0	14-25-1
Time of possession	31:44	28:16

Team	Category	Player	Statistics
Eastern Michigan	Passing	Cole Snyder	29/48, 354 yards, 2 TD
Eastern Michigan	Rushing	Delbert Mimms III	22 carries, 58 yards, TD
Eastern Michigan	Receiving	Terry Lockett Jr.	3 receptions, 98 yards
Akron	Passing	Ben Finley	12/22, 121 yards, TD, INT
Akron	Rushing	Jordon Simmons	16 carries, 109 yards
Akron	Receiving	Bobby Golden	4 receptions, 61 yards

=== Buffalo ===
Buffalo Bulls (4–4) at Akron Zips (2–6) – Game summary

Quarter	1	2	3	4	Total
Bulls	14	10	14	3	41
Zips	7	0	0	23	30

at InfoCision Stadium • Akron, OH

- Date: November 2, 2024
- Game time: 12:00 p.m.
- Game weather: 0 °F (−18 °C)
- TV announcers (CBSSN): John Sadak (play-by-play) and Randy Cross (analyst)

Game information

First quarter

- (13:16) AKR – Ahmarian Granger 29-yard pass from Ben Finley (Garrison Smith kick), Drive: 5 plays, 71 yards, 1:44; AKR 7–0
- (07:50) BUFF – JJ Jenkins 18-yard pass from C.J. Ogbonna (Upton Bellenfant kick), Drive: 2 plays, 62 yards, 0:39; Tied 7–7
- (04:35) BUFF – Jacqez Barksdale 1-yard run (Upton Bellenfant kick), Drive: 8 plays, 23 yards, 2:58; BUFF 14–7

Second quarter

- (14:19) BUFF – Upton Bellenfant 33-yard field goal, Drive: 9 plays, 30 yards, 3:42; BUFF 17–7
- (08:04) BUFF – Jake Orlando 2-yard pass from C.J. Ogbonna (Upton Bellenfant kick), Drive: 11 plays, 88 yards, 4:17; BUFF 24–7

Third quarter

- (13:03) BUFF – Al-Jay Henderson 45-yard run (Upton Bellenfant kick), Drive: 6 plays, 77 yards, 1:48; BUFF 31–7
- (02:33) BUFF – C.J. Ogbonna 8-yard run (Upton Bellenfant kick), Drive: 4 plays, 44 yards, 1:57; BUFF 38–7

Fourth quarter

- (14:51) AKR – Adrian Norton 28-yard pass from Ben Finley (Tahj Bullock pass to Adrian Norton for 2-point conversion), Drive: 10 plays, 88 yards, 2:32; BUFF 38–15
- (09:25) AKR – Adrian Norton 25-yard pass from Ben Finley (Garrison Smith kick), Drive: 8 plays, 75 yards, 3:07; BUFF 38–22
- (04:39) AKR – Kyan Mason 28-yard pass from Ben Finley (Tahj Bullock run for 2-point conversion), Drive: 11 plays, 72 yards, 2:32; BUFF 38–30
- (02:38) BUFF – Upton Bellenfant 36-yard field goal, Drive: 4 plays, 4 yards, 0:21; BUFF 41–30

Statistics	UB	AKR
First downs	19	23
Total yards	390	452
Rushing yards	180	74
Passing yards	210	378
Passing: Comp–Att–Int	17-29-0	23-43-1
Time of possession	32:56	27:04

Team	Category	Player	Statistics
Buffalo	Passing	C.J. Ogbonna	17/29, 210 yards, 2 TD
Buffalo	Rushing	Al-Jay Henderson	18 carries, 107 yards, TD
Buffalo	Receiving	JJ Jenkins	5 receptions, 57 yards, TD
Akron	Passing	Ben Finley	23/42, 378 yards, 4 TD, INT
Akron	Rushing	Jordon Simmons	14 carries, 68 yards
Akron	Receiving	Adrian Norton	6 receptions, 98 yards, 2 TD

=== at Northern Illinois ===
Akron Zips (2–7) at Northern Illinois Huskies (5–4) – Game summary

Quarter	1	2	3	4	Total
Zips	6	10	0	0	16
Huskies	17	6	0	6	29

at Huskie Stadium • DeKalb, IL

- Date: November 13, 2024
- Game time: 7:00 p.m.
- Game weather: 0 °F (−18 °C)
- TV announcers (CBSSN): Jason Knapp (play-by-play) and Brock Vereen (analyst)

Game information
First quarter
- NIU – Kanon Woodill 32-yard field goal, 12:31. Huskies 3–0. Drive: 4 plays, 6 yards, 1:34.
- AKR – Adrian Norton 40-yard pass from Ben Finley (2-point conversion failed), 9:46. Zips 6–3. Drive: 7 plays, 68 yards, 2:38.
- NIU – Trayvon Rudolph 58-yard run (Kanon Woodill kick), 8:20. Huskies 10–6. Drive: 3 plays, 70 yards, 1:21.
- NIU – Dane Pardridge 39-yard pass from Trayvon Rudolph (Kanon Woodill kick), 3:50. Huskies 17–6. Drive: 4 plays, 55 yards, 2:21.

Second quarter

- AKR – Garrison Smith 27-yard field goal, 10:56. Huskies 17–9. Drive: 11 plays, 78 yards, 4:33.
- AKR – Terence Thomas 0-yard blocked punt return (Garrison Smith kick), 9:20. Huskies 17–16. Drive: 3 plays, 3 yards, 1:36.
- NIU – Grayson Barnes 32-yard pass from Ethan Hampton (2-point conversion failed), 5:32. Huskies 23–16. Drive: 7 plays, 82 yards, 3:42.

Third quarter

- No scoring plays

Fourth quarter

- NIU – Gavin Williams 71-yard run (2-point conversion failed), 7:56. Huskies 29–16. Drive: 1 plays, 71 yards, 0:09.

Statistics	AKR	NIU
First downs	19	14
Total yards	255	439
Rushing yards	50	295
Passing yards	205	144
Turnovers	1	0
Time of possession	26:31	33:29

Team	Category	Player	Statistics
Akron	Passing	Ben Finley	19/52, 205 yards, TD
Akron	Rushing	Jordon Simmons	12 carries, 56 yards
Akron	Receiving	Adrian Norton	2 receptions, 57 yards, TD
Northern Illinois	Passing	Ethan Hampton	9/16, 105 yards, TD
Northern Illinois	Rushing	Telly Johnson Jr.	21 carries, 104 yards
Northern Illinois	Receiving	Dane Pardridge	1 reception, 39 yards, TD

=== at Kent State (Wagon Wheel) ===
Akron Zips (2–8) at Kent State Golden Flashes (0–10) – Game summary

Quarter	1	2	3	4	Total
Zips	10	13	15	0	38
Golden Flashes	7	3	0	7	17

at Dix Stadium • Kent, OH

- Date: November 19, 2024
- Game time: 7:00 p.m.
- Game weather: Cloudy • Temperature: 56 °F (13 °C) • Wind: S 4 miles per hour (6.4 km/h)
- Game attendance: 6,768
- Referee: Matt Packowski
- TV announcers (CBSSN): John Sadak (play-by-play) and Ross Tucker (analyst)

Game information

First quarter

- (13:31) KENT – Luke Floriea 80-yard pass from Tommy Ulatowski, Will Hryszko kick (Drive: 3 plays, 84 yards, 1:20; Kent State 7–0)
- (10:34) AKR – Garrison Smith 43-yard field goal (Drive: 7 plays, 42 yards, 2:50; Kent State 7–3)
- (4:15) AKR – Tahj Bullock 3-yard run, Garrison Smith kick (Drive: 8 plays, 50 yards, 3:54; Akron 10–7)

Second quarter

- (13:05) AKR – Charles Kellom 13-yard run, Garrison Smith kick (Drive: 7 plays, 91 yards, 3:58; Akron 17–7)
- (8:35) KENT – Will Hryszko 40-yard field goal (Drive: 8 plays, 53 yards, 4:30; Akron 17–10)
- (6:01) AKR – Garrison Smith 26-yard field goal (Drive: 9 plays, 62 yards, 2:31; Akron 20–10)
- (0:00) AKR – Garrison Smith 27-yard field goal (Drive: 9 plays, 89 yards, 1:43; Akron 23–10)

Third quarter

- (10:52) AKR – Tahj Bullock 8-yard run, Garrison Smith kick (Drive: 9 plays, 65 yards, 4:08; Akron 30–10)
- (4:17) AKR – Jarvis Rush 36-yard pass from Ben Finley, Charles Kellom pass (Drive: 7 plays, 81 yards, 4:38; Akron 38–10)

Fourth quarter

- (5:08) KENT – Chrishon McCray 37-yard pass from Tommy Ulatowski, Will Hryszko kick (Drive: 4 plays, 59 yards, 1:16; Akron 38–17)

Statistics	AKR	KENT
First downs	28	9
Plays–yards	77–527	48–281
Rushes–yards	46–277	28–52
Passing yards	30–250	20–229
Passing: comp–att–int	14–31–0	12–20–1
Time of possession	36:32	23:28

Team	Category	Player	Statistics
Akron	Passing	Ben Finley	14/29, 250 yards, TD
Akron	Rushing	Jordan Simmons	11 carries, 113 yards
Akron	Receiving	Adrian Norton	5 receptions, 107 yards
Kent State	Passing	Tommy Ulatowski	12/20, 229 yards, 2 TD, INT
Kent State	Rushing	Ky Thomas	13 carries, 52 yards
Kent State	Receiving	Luke Floriea	3 receptions, 103 yards, TD

=== Toledo ===
Toledo Rockets (7–4) at Akron Zips (3–8) – Game summary

Quarter	1	2	3	4	OT	Total
Rockets	0	0	0	14	0	14
Zips	7	0	0	7	7	21

at InfoCision Stadium • Akron, OH

- Date: November 26, 2024
- Game time: 7:00 p.m.
- Game weather: Sunny
- Game attendance: 4,716
- Referee: Billy Williams
- TV announcers (ESPN2): Matt Schumacker (play-by-play) and Dustin Fox (analyst)

Game information

First quarter

- (10:47) AKR – Ahmarian Granger 72-yard pass from Ben Finley, Garrison Smith kick (Drive: 1 play, 72 yards, 0:11; Akron 7–0)

Second quarter

No scoring plays

Third quarter

No scoring plays

Fourth quarter

- (13:57) AKR – Tahj Bullock 1-yard run, Garrison Smith kick (Drive: 13 plays, 80 yards, 6:54; Akron 14–0)
- (10:47) TOL – Anthony Torres 7-yard pass from Tucker Gleason, Dylan Cunanan kick (Drive: 10 plays, 85 yards, 3:03; Akron 14–7)
- (3:26) TOL – Jerjuan Newton 19-yard pass from Tucker Gleason, Dylan Cunanan kick (Drive: 7 plays, 92 yards, 2:41; Tied 14–14)

Overtime

- (0:00) AKR – Charles Kellom 25-yard pass from Ben Finley, Garrison Smith kick (Drive: 1 play, 25 yards, 0:00; Akron 21–14)

Statistics	TOL	AKR
First downs	30	18
Plays–yards	86–465	57–328
Rushes–yards	42–176	34–107
Passing yards	289	221
Passing: comp–att–int	31–44–0	12–23–0
Time of possession	32:24	27:36

Team	Category	Player	Statistics
Toledo	Passing	Tucker Gleason	31/44, 289 yards, 2 TD
Toledo	Rushing	Connor Walendzak	19 carries, 87 yards
Toledo	Receiving	Junior Vandeross III	11 receptions, 84 yards
Akron	Passing	Ben Finley	10/21, 194 yards, 2 TD
Akron	Rushing	Charles Kellom	21 carries, 69 yards
Akron	Receiving	Ahmarian Granger	2 receptions, 106 yards, TD
