= 2024 Salute to Veterans Bowl =

Postseason college football bowl game

2024 IS4S Salute to Veterans Bowl
- 11th Salute to Veterans Bowl
South Alabama Jaguars	Western Michigan Broncos
(6–6)	(6–6)
Sun Belt	MAC
30	23
Head coach: Major Applewhite	Head coach: Lance Taylor
	1	2	3	4	Total
South Alabama	0	16	7	7	30
Western Michigan	7	6	0	10	23
- Date: December 14, 2024
- Season: 2024
- Stadium: Cramton Bowl
- Location: Montgomery, Alabama
- MVP: Jeremiah Webb (WR, South Alabama)
- Favorite: South Alabama by 5.5
- Referee: Cal McNeill (Mountain West)
- Attendance: 12,021

United States TV coverage
- Network: ESPN
- Announcers: Wes Durham (play-by-play), Tom Luginbill (analyst), and Dana Boyle (sideline)

The 2024 Salute to Veterans Bowl was a college football bowl game that was played on December 14, 2024, at the Cramton Bowl in Montgomery, Alabama. It was the 11th edition of the Salute to Veterans Bowl, formerly known as the Camellia Bowl. The bowl featured South Alabama and Western Michigan. The game began at approximately 8:00 p.m. CST and was aired on ESPN, as the first of the 2024–25 bowl games concluding the 2024 FBS football season. (Note: The 2024 Celebration Bowl, featuring FCS teams, had an earlier start time on the same game date.) Sponsored by information technology company Integrated Solutions for Systems (IS4S), it was officially known as the IS4S Salute to Veterans Bowl.

== Teams ==
Consistent with conference tie-ins, the game featured teams from the Mid-American Conference (MAC) and the Sun Belt Conference with a matchup of Western Michigan of the MAC and South Alabama of the Sun Belt. This was the first-ever meeting of the Jaguars and Broncos.

=== Western Michigan Broncos ===
Western Michigan entered the bowl with a 6–6 overall record, 5–3 in conference play. The Broncos faced one ranked team during the season, losing to Ohio State, 56–0.

=== South Alabama Jaguars ===
South Alabama also entered the bowl with a 6–6 overall record, 5–3 in conference play. The Jaguars faced one ranked team during the season, losing to LSU, 42–10.

== Game summary ==
2024 Salute to Veterans Bowl

Quarter	1	2	3	4	Total
South Alabama	0	16	7	7	30
Western Michigan	7	6	0	10	23

at Cramton Bowl • Montgomery, Alabama

- Date: Saturday, December 14, 2024
- Game time: 8:15 p.m. CST
- Game weather: Temperature: 60 °F (16 °C) • Wind: E at 10 mph (16 km/h) • Weather: Cloudy
- Game attendance: 12,021
- Referee: Cal McNeill
- TV announcers (ESPN): Wes Durham (play-by-play), Tom Luginbill (analyst), and Dana Boyle (sideline)

Game information

First Quarter

- (10:31) WMU – Jalen Buckley 1 yard rush, Luka Zurak kick (Drive: 5 plays, 71 yards, 2:36; Western Michigan 7–0)

Second Quarter

- (14:50) WMU – Luke Zurak 37 yard field goal (Drive: 12 plays, 61 yards, 6:23; Western Michigan 10–0)
- (12:15) USA – Hamilton DiBoyan 24 yard field goal (Drive: 9 plays, 69 yards, 2:35; Western Michigan 10–3)
- (10:29) USA – Jeremiah Webb 52 yard pass from Bishop Davenport, Hamilton DiBoyan kick (Drive: 2 plays, 80 yards, 0:35; Tied 10–10)
- (4:50) USA – Jeremiah Webb 45 yard pass from Bishop Davenport, Hamilton DiBoyan kick no good (Drive: 9 plays, 80 yards, 4:06; South Alabama 16–10)
- (0:13) WMU – Luka Zurak 29 yard field goal (Drive: 5 plays, 11 yards, 1:12; South Alabama 16–13)

Third Quarter

- (4:18) USA – Bishop Davenport 50 yard rush, Hamilton DiBoyan kick (Drive: 8 plays, 90 yards, 4:04; South Alabama 23–13)

Fourth Quarter

- (6:17) WMU – Anthony Sambucci 7 yard pass from Hayden Wolff, Luka Zurak kick (Drive: 9 plays, 75 yards, 5:07; South Alabama 23–20)
- (2:42) USA – Kentrel Bullock 22 yard rush, Hamilton DiBoyan kick (Drive: 8 plays, 75 yards, 3:35; South Alabama 30–20)
- (1:11) WMU – Luka Zurak 48 yard field goal (Drive: 8 plays, 40 yards, 1:31; South Alabama 30–23)

=== Statistics ===
Statistics	USA	WMU
First downs	25	22
Plays–yards	62–537	61–317
Rushes–yards	38–266	34–121
Passing yards	271	196
Passing: comp–att–int	15–24–1	17–27–1
Turnovers		
Time of possession	28.54	31.06

Team	Category	Player	Statistics
South Alabama	Passing	Bishop Davenport	15/24, 271 yards, 2 TD, INT
South Alabama	Rushing	Kentrel Bullock	17 carries, 130 yards, TD
South Alabama	Receiving	Jeremiah Webb	6 receptions, 182 yards, 2 TD
Western Michigan	Passing	Hayden Wolff	17/27, 196 yards, TD, INT
Western Michigan	Rushing	Jaden Nixon	11 carries, 45 yards
Western Michigan	Receiving	Kenneth Womack	5 receptions, 89 yards
