= Bishop Davenport =

American football player (born 2003)

No. 4 – South Alabama Jaguars
- Position: Quarterback
- Class: Redshirt Senior

Personal information
- Born: November 8, 2003 (age 22)
- Listed height: 6 ft 2 in (1.88 m)
- Listed weight: 210 lb (95 kg)

Career information
- High school: Spring (Spring, Texas)
- College: Utah State (2022); South Alabama (2023–present)
- Stats at ESPN

Bishop Davenport (born November 8, 2003) is an American college football quarterback for the South Alabama Jaguars. He previously played for the Utah State Aggies.

== Early life ==
Davenport attended Spring High School in Spring, Texas. He was named the Texas District 14-6A Overall MVP as a junior and the Texas District 14-6A co-Offensive MVP as a senior. Davenport finished his high school career completing 486 of 714 passes for 7,433 yards and 77 touchdowns, while also rushing for 1,667 yards and 16 touchdowns on 232 carries, and was rated as a three-star recruit. He committed to play college football for the Utah State Aggies.

== College career ==
=== Utah State ===
In week 8 of the 2022 season, Davenport entered the game after injuries to both Cooper Legas and Levi Williams, and completed three of his nine pass attempts for 41 yards, while also adding 29 yards and a touchdown on the ground, as he led the Aggies to a comeback win over Colorado State. He made his first collegiate start versus Wyoming the following week. Davenport finished the 2022 season, completing 27 of his 44 passing attempts for 245 yards, while rushing for 60 yards, and totaling two touchdowns. After the season, he entered his name into the NCAA transfer portal.

=== South Alabama ===
Davenport transferred to play for the South Alabama Jaguars. He made the start in the 2024 Salute to Veterans Bowl, where he completed 15 of his 30 passes for 271 yards and two touchdowns, while adding a 85 yards and a touchdown on the ground in a victory over Western Michigan. Davenport finished the 2024 season playing in 11 games, where he completed 48 of his 79 pass attempts for 606 yards and three touchdowns, while rushing for 167 yards and a touchdown. In 2025, he beat out Jared Hollins and Minnesota transfer Zach Pyron for the Jaguars starting job.

=== College statistics ===
Season	Team	Games			Passing								Rushing			
Season	Team	GP	GS	Record	Cmp	Att	Pct	Yds	Avg	TD	Int	Rtg	Att	Yds	Avg	TD
2022	Utah State	3	1	0–1	27	44	61.4	245	5.6	1	2	106.5	30	49	1.6	2
2023	South Alabama	Redshirt (redshirt)														
2024	South Alabama	11	2	1–1	48	79	60.8	606	7.7	3	1	135.2	37	167	4.5	1
2025	South Alabama	12	12	4–8	200	294	68.0	2,073	7.1	12	6	136.6	116	325	2.8	9
Career		26	15	5–10	275	417	65.9	2,924	7.0	16	9	133.2	183	541	2.9	12
