= Jeremiah Webb =

American football player (born 2001)

Profile
- Position: Wide receiver

Personal information
- Born: May 17, 2001 (age 25); Chicago, Illinois, U.S.
- Listed height: 5 ft 11 in (1.80 m)
- Listed weight: 198 lb (90 kg)

Career information
- High school: Urban Prep Bronzeville (Chicago)
- College: South Dakota (2019–2021); South Alabama (2022–2024)
- NFL draft: 2025: undrafted

Career history
- Berlin Thunder (2025)*; New England Patriots (2025–2026)*
- * Offseason or practice squad member only

Awards and highlights
- Salute to Veterans Bowl MVP (2024)
- Stats at Pro Football Reference

Jeremiah Webb (born May 17, 2001) is an American professional football wide receiver. He played college football for the South Dakota Coyotes and South Alabama Jaguars.

== Early life ==
Webb was born on May 17, 2001 in Chicago, Illinois. Originally recruited as a cornerback, he played quarterback, wide receiver, and running back alongside this. Rated a two-star recruit, he committed to New Mexico in 2018. However, he later decommitted and instead joined the South Dakota Coyotes. Along with South Dakota and New Mexico, he also had offers from Ball State, Navy, Northern Illinois, North Dakota State, among others.

== College career ==
=== South Dakota ===
Webb redshirted his first year for the coyotes. In 2020, as the season was shortened to only four games, he saw no playing time. In his final and most productive year as a Coyote, his most memorable moment was a 57-yard Hail Mary catch to beat rival and 4th-ranked South Dakota State. On the final play of the game, he caught his first collegiate touchdown to win 23-20. Despite producing for the first time in his college career, he decided to enter the transfer portal.

=== South Alabama ===
Webb opted to transfer to South Alabama. He was unremarkable, playing only in one game in 2022. In 2023, he caught two passes for 59 yards and a touchdown. As a sixth year senior, he set career highs with 36 catches, 649 yards, and 5 touchdowns. He was also named the MVP of the 2024 Salute to Veterans Bowl.

== Professional career ==
Pre-draft measurables
Height	Weight	Arm length	Hand span	Wingspan	40-yard dash
5 ft 11 1/2 in (1.82 m)	198 lb (90 kg)	30 1/8 in (0.77 m)	9 in (0.23 m)	6 ft 1 5/8 in (1.87 m)	4.49 s
All values from Pro Day

=== Berlin Thunder ===
Webb initially signed with the Berlin Thunder of the European League of Football. He joined teammate Jakeb Sullivan as the only two Americans on the team after signing on April 7. However, he spent only about a month there before leaving for the NFL.

=== New England Patriots ===
On April 28, 2025, the New England Patriots signed Webb to a 3-year, $2.967 million contract. In the preseason, he caught 6 passes for 80 yards and a touchdown that came on a pass from fellow UDFA Ben Wooldridge. In college, Wooldridge played for Louisiana, a conference opponent of South Alabama. Despite this, he spoke highly of Webb. Although he played well in the preseason, Webb could not earn a roster spot and was released on August 26 before being signed to the team's practice squad on August 28.

On February 11, 2026, Webb signed a reserve/futures contract with New England. He was placed on injured reserve on July 26. He was released on October 20.
