= Kenneth Womack (Canadian football) =

American football player (born 2001)

Winnipeg Blue Bombers
- Position: Wide receiver
- Roster status: Active
- CFL status: American

Personal information
- Born: February 7, 2001 (age 25)
- Listed height: 5 ft 10 in (1.78 m)
- Listed weight: 200 lb (91 kg)

Career information
- High school: Bishop McNamara (Forestville, Maryland)
- College: Sacred Heart (2020–2022); Western Michigan (2023–2024)
- NFL draft: 2025: undrafted

Career history
- Winnipeg Blue Bombers (2026–present)

Awards and highlights
- First-team All-MAC (2023)
- Stats at CFL.ca

Kenneth Womack (born February 7, 2001) is an American professional football wide receiver for the Winnipeg Blue Bombers of the Canadian Football League (CFL). He played college football for the Sacred Heart Pioneers and Western Michigan Broncos.

== Early life ==
Womack was born on February 7, 2001. He attended Bishop McNamara High School in Forestville, Maryland. As a senior, Womack recorded 608 receiving yards and 13 touchdowns.

== College career ==
Womack played college football for the Sacred Heart Pioneers from 2020 to 2022 and Western Michigan Broncos from 2023 to 2024. He played in 26 games, registering 98 receptions for 1,234 yards and five touchdowns. Womack also played on the Pioneers' basketball team at guard. He saw action in 17 games, where he averaged 2.9 points, 1.1 rebounds, 1.6 assists and 0.9 steals per game.

In 2023, Womack transferred to Western Michigan University for his final two years of eligibility, where he made an immediate impact, leading the MAC in receptions. He caught 76 passes for 691 yards and one touchdown, earning him first-team All-MAC honors. As a senior, Womack had 39 receptions, for 545 yards and a touchdown with seven rushing yards.

== Professional career ==
Pre-draft measurables
Height	Weight	Arm length	Hand span	Wingspan	40-yard dash	10-yard split	20-yard split	20-yard shuttle	Three-cone drill	Vertical jump	Broad jump	Bench press
5 ft 10 in (1.78 m)	194 lb (88 kg)	32 in (0.81 m)	8 7/8 in (0.23 m)	6 ft 1 1/2 in (1.87 m)	4.60 s	1.58 s	2.64 s	4.40 s	7.01 s	35.5 in (0.90 m)	9 ft 8 in (2.95 m)	13 reps
All values from Pro day

On November 17, 2025, Womack was signed by the Winnipeg Blue Bombers of the Canadian Football League (CFL). On May 14, 2026, he was released but was brought back on May 25. On May 31, Womack was assigned to the practice roster. On September 11, he was elevated to the active roster and made his CFL debut in the Banjo Bowl. In the following game against the Toronto Argonauts, Womack made one tackle. On October 1, he was moved to the practice roster. On October 29, Womack was released. On November 14, Womack was re-signed.
