= Coleman Owen =

American football player (born 2001)

No. 13 – Green Bay Packers
- Position: Wide receiver
- Roster status: Practice squad

Personal information
- Born: March 23, 2001 (age 25); Gilbert, Arizona, U.S.
- Listed height: 5 ft 10 in (1.78 m)
- Listed weight: 181 lb (82 kg)

Career information
- High school: Higley (Gilbert)
- College: Northern Arizona (2019–2023); Ohio (2024)
- NFL draft: 2025: undrafted

Career history
- Indianapolis Colts (2025); Green Bay Packers (2026–present)

Awards and highlights
- First-team All-MAC (2024); 2× Second-team All-Big Sky (2022, 2023)

Career NFL statistics as of Week 10, 2026
- Return yards: 284
- Stats at Pro Football Reference

Coleman Owen (born March 23, 2001) is an American professional football wide receiver for the Green Bay Packers of the National Football League (NFL). He played college football for the Northern Arizona Lumberjacks and Ohio Bobcats.

== Early life ==
Owen was born March 23, 2001, in Gilbert, Arizona, and attended Higley High School in Gilbert. He is Christian and a member of Athletes in Action.

== College career ==
Owen played five college football seasons for the Northern Arizona Lumberjacks. In 2019, he played in three games, recording three receptions and four kick returns. The 2020 season was postponed to early 2021 due to the COVID-19 pandemic; Owen started in all five games of the season, recording 16 receptions for 202 yards and two touchdowns. He also returned one kick for 22 yards and tallied two punt returns for 27 yards, as well as a safety on special teams. He started nine of 11 games in 2021, when his 43 receptions, 713 yards, and six touchdowns all led his team.

In the 2022 season, Owen started in each of the nine games he played in. His 690 yards from 62 receptions again led his team. He added four touchdowns, plus 37 punt return yards and 11 rushing yards as he was named second-team All-Big Sky.

Owen started in nine of 11 games in the 2023 season. He recorded 54 receptions, 649 yards, and five touchdowns. He also returned eight punts for 152 yards and one touchdown, and four kicks for 98 yards. Owen was named second-team All-Big Sky for a second time after the 2023 season.

Owen played for the Ohio Bobcats during the 2024 season. He started in all 14 games and recorded 78 receptions, 1,245 yards, and eight receiving touchdowns. He also returned 17 punts for 132 yards and one touchdown, and additionally recorded 26 rushing yards and one rushing touchdown. He scored two receiving touchdowns in a 30–10 win against the Akron Zips. Owen scored two receiving touchdowns and one rushing touchdown in a 47–16 win against the Buffalo Bulls. He scored his punt return touchdown in a 41–0 win against the Kent State Golden Flashes. His 1,245 receiving yards set an Ohio Bobcats single-season record, and Owen is the third player in Ohio program history to reach 1,000 receiving yards in a season. Owen was named first-team All-MAC for the 2024 season.

== Professional career ==
Pre-draft measurables
Height	Weight	Arm length	Hand span	Wingspan	40-yard dash	10-yard split	20-yard split	20-yard shuttle	Three-cone drill	Vertical jump	Broad jump	Bench press
5 ft 10 1/8 in (1.78 m)	181 lb (82 kg)	29 in (0.74 m)	9 1/4 in (0.23 m)	5 ft 11 in (1.80 m)	4.53 s	1.58 s	2.59 s	4.06 s	6.84 s	36.0 in (0.91 m)	10 ft 0 in (3.05 m)	14 reps
All values from Pro Day

=== Indianapolis Colts ===
After going unselected in the 2025 NFL draft, Owen was signed by the Indianapolis Colts as an undrafted free agent. As a prospect, Owen was noted as a slot receiver who was especially proficient in gaining yards after catch. The Colts waived Owen on August 26, 2025 and signed him to the team's practice squad on August 27. He was elevated to the active roster for the Colts' Week 15 game against the Seattle Seahawks and the Week 16 game against the San Francisco 49ers. Owen signed a reserve/future contract with Indianapolis on January 5, 2026.

Owen sustained a concussion during a preseason game on August 29. He was placed on injured reserve on August 30. He was released on September 7.

=== Green Bay Packers ===
On September 30, 2026, Owen was signed to the Green Bay Packers' practice squad. He was elevated to the active roster for Week 6. He was signed to the active roster on October 24. He was waived on November 14 and re-signed to the practice squad three days later.

== NFL career statistics ==
Year	Team	Games		Kick returns					Punt returns				
Year	Team	GP	GS	Ret	Yds	Avg	Lng	TD	Ret	Yds	Avg	Lng	TD
2025	IND	2	0	5	141	28.2	33	0	1	2	2	2	0
Total		2	0	5	141	28.2	33	0	1	2	2	2	0
