= Hayden Wolff =

American football player

No. 11
- Position: Quarterback

Personal information
- Listed height: 6 ft 5 in (1.96 m)
- Listed weight: 235 lb (107 kg)

Career information
- High school: Venice (Venice, Florida)
- College: Old Dominion (2019–2022); Western Michigan (2023–2024)
- Stats at ESPN

Hayden Wolff is an American football quarterback. He played college football for the Old Dominion Monarchs and the Western Michigan Broncos.

== Early life ==
Wolff attended Venice High School in Venice, Florida, where he lettered in football and basketball. He completed 189 of 299 pass attempts for 2,684 yards, 24 touchdowns and nine interceptions over his high school career. Wolff was rated a three-star recruit and committed to play college football at Old Dominion over offers from Charlotte, Columbia, Dartmouth, Eastern Michigan, FIU, Georgia State, Harvard, Kentucky, Massachusetts, Princeton, Toledo, Tulane, Western Kentucky and Yale.

== College career ==
=== Old Dominion ===
As a freshman in 2019, Wolff played in and started three games at quarterback and was redshirted. He completed 75 of 129 passing attempts for 737 yards, two touchdowns and three interceptions. In 2021, Wolff played in 10 games and started seven. He completed 159 of 253 passing attempts for 1,933 yards, 10 touchdowns and seven interceptions. During the 2022 season, he started all 12 games at quarterback, completing 234 of 413 passing attempts for 2,908 yards, 18 touchdowns and six interceptions.

On April 11, 2023, Wolff announced that he would be entering the transfer portal. On May 3, he announced that he would be transferring to Western Michigan.

=== Western Michigan ===
During the 2023 season, Wolff played the first two games but was named the leading quarterback after a week 3 game against Miami (Ohio). Wolff played in 8 games and started 4, completing 148 of 226 passes for 1,505 yards and 8 touchdowns to go with 2 rushing touchdowns. His best game came against rival Central Michigan where he threw for 333 yards and 3 touchdowns.

Prior to the 2024 season, Wolff was named to the Johnny Unitas Golden Arm Award watchlist. He started all 13 games that season and completed 208 of 312 passes for 2,410 yards and 18 touchdowns. Following a 45-42 win over Ball State where he completed 26 of 29 passes for 265 yards and three touchdowns, Wolff was named MAC Offensive Player of the Week and MAC Male Scholar Athlete of the Week. In the 2024 Salute to Veterans Bowl, he completed 17 of 27 passes for 196 yards, a touchdown and an interception in a loss to South Alabama.

=== College statistics ===
Year	Team	Games			Passing								Rushing			
Year	Team	GP	GS	Record	Cmp	Att	Pct	Yds	Avg	TD	Int	Rtg	Att	Yds	Avg	TD
2019	Old Dominion	3	3	0−3	75	129	58.1	737	5.7	2	3	106.6	12	−10	−0.8	0
2020	Old Dominion	Season canceled due to the COVID-19 pandemic														
2021	Old Dominion	10	7	5−2	159	253	62.7	1,933	7.6	10	7	133.2	14	−92	−6.6	0
2022	Old Dominion	12	12	3−9	234	412	56.8	2,904	7.0	18	6	127.5	62	−64	−1.0	1
2023	Western Michigan	8	5	2−3	148	226	65.5	1,505	6.7	8	5	128.7	44	17	0.4	2
2024	Western Michigan	13	13	6−7	208	312	66.7	2,410	7.7	18	8	145.5	39	−101	−2.6	0
Career		46	40	16−24	824	1,333	61.8	9,493	7.1	56	29	131.1	171	−266	−1.6	3
