= 1936 Slippery Rock Rockets football team =

American college football season

1936 Slippery Rock Rockets football

Northwestern Pennsylvania champion
- Conference: Pennsylvania State Teachers Conference
- Record: 6–3 (3–1 PSTC)
- Head coach: N. Kerr Thompson (16th season)
- Home stadium: New Slippery Rock Stadium

1936 Pennsylvania State Teachers Conference football standings
	Conf.					Overall
Team	W		L		T	W		L		T
Lock Haven $	6	–	0	–	2	6	–	0	–	2
Shippensburg	6	–	1	–	0	7	–	1	–	0
Mansfield	4	–	1	–	0	4	–	3	–	0
Slippery Rock	3	–	1	–	0	6	–	3	–	0
Indiana (PA)	4	–	2	–	1	4	–	2	–	1
West Chester	1	–	1	–	0	4	–	4	–	1
Kutztown	1	–	1	–	1	5	–	2	–	1
California (PA)	3	–	4	–	0	3	–	4	–	1
Edinboro	1	–	3	–	0	1	–	4	–	0
Millersville	1	–	4	–	0	3	–	4	–	0
Bloomsburg	1	–	6	–	0	1	–	7	–	0
East Stroudsburg	0	–	3	–	0	2	–	6	–	0
Clarion	0	–	4	–	0	0	–	6	–	0
$ – Conference champion

The 1936 Slippery Rock Rockets football team represented Slippery Rock State Normal School—now known as Slippery Rock University of Pennsylvania—in the 1936 college football season.

== History ==
In N. Kerr Thompson's 16th year as head coach, the Rockets compiled a 6–3 record and outscored their opponents 93 to 70. The Rockets went 3–1 against conference opponents, finishing fourth in the Pennsylvania State Teachers conference.

The team is most famous for a news story that circulated around the United States and used the transitive property to declare Slippery Rock the national champion. Slippery Rock made its case by beating the Westminster Titans, which defeated West Virginia Wesleyan, which beat Duquesne, which upset Pittsburgh, which beat Notre Dame, which upset former #1 Northwestern, which defeated Minnesota, who was crowned national champions by the Associated Press. The humorous story was widely popular, and gave Slippery Rock college a good deal of notoriety.

== Schedule ==
Date	Opponent	Site	Result	Attendance	Source
September 26	at West Chester	West Chester, PA	L 6–13	2,000	
October 3	at Geneva*	Beaver Falls, PA	L 0–25		
October 10	Indiana Normal^{†}	New Slippery Rock Stadium; Slippery Rock, PA	W 10–0	3,500	
October 17	at Westminster (PA)*	New Wilmington, PA	W 14–0		
October 24	at Waynesburg*	Waynesburg, PA	L 0–20		
October 31	Grove City*	New Slippery Rock Stadium; Slippery Rock, PA	W 6–0	2,500	
November 7	Bloomsburg	Bloomsburg, PA	W 10–0		
November 14	Thiel*	New Slippery Rock Stadium; Slippery Rock, PA	W 14–6		
November 21	California (PA)	New Slippery Rock Stadium; Slippery Rock, PA	W 33–6		
*Non-conference game; ^{†}Homecoming
