= 2024 Bowling Green Falcons football team =

American college football season

2024 Bowling Green Falcons football

68 Ventures Bowl, L 31–38 vs. Arkansas State
- Conference: Mid-American Conference
- Record: 7–6 (6–2 MAC)
- Head coach: Scot Loeffler (6th season)
- Co-offensive coordinators: Max Warner (3rd season); Greg Nosal (3rd season)
- Offensive scheme: Pro spread
- Co-defensive coordinators: Steve Morrison (2nd season); Sammy Lawanson (2nd season)
- Base defense: Multiple 4–3
- Home stadium: Doyt Perry Stadium

2024 Mid-American Conference football standings
	Conf.			Overall
Team	W		L	W		L
Ohio y$	7	–	1	11	–	3
Miami (OH) y	7	–	1	9	–	5
Buffalo	6	–	2	9	–	4
Bowling Green	6	–	2	7	–	6
Western Michigan	5	–	3	6	–	7
Toledo	4	–	4	8	–	5
Northern Illinois	4	–	4	8	–	5
Akron	3	–	5	4	–	8
Eastern Michigan	2	–	6	5	–	7
Central Michigan	2	–	6	4	–	8
Ball State	2	–	6	3	–	9
Kent State	0	–	8	0	–	12
Championship: Ohio 38, Miami (OH) 3
$ – Conference champion; y – Championship game participant

The 2024 Bowling Green Falcons football team represented Bowling Green State University in the Mid-American Conference during the 2024 NCAA Division I FBS football season. The Falcons were led by Scot Loeffler in his sixth year as the head coach. The Falcons played home games at Doyt Perry Stadium, located in Bowling Green, Ohio.

On February 28, 2025, Loeffler announced he was stepping down after being named the quarterbacks coach for the Philadelphia Eagles.

== Preseason ==
=== Preseason poll ===
On July 19, the MAC announced the preseason coaches poll. Bowling Green was picked to finish tied for third in the conference. The Falcons received zero votes to win the MAC Championship.

== Schedule ==
Date	Time	Opponent	Site	TV	Result	Attendance
August 29	7:00 p.m.	Fordham*	Doyt Perry Stadium; Bowling Green, OH	ESPN+	W 41–17	12,786
September 7	12:00 p.m.	at No. 8 Penn State*	Beaver Stadium; University Park, PA	BTN	L 27–34	103,861
September 21	7:30 p.m.	at No. 25 Texas A&M*	Kyle Field; College Station, TX	SECN+/ESPN+	L 20–26	99,523
September 28	5:00 p.m.	Old Dominion^{†}*	Doyt Perry Stadium; Bowling Green, OH	ESPN+	L 27–30	19,140
October 5	3:30 p.m.	at Akron	InfoCision Stadium; Akron, OH	ESPN+	W 27–20	9,337
October 12	3:30 p.m.	Northern Illinois	Doyt Perry Stadium; Bowling Green, OH	ESPN+	L 7–17	9,559
October 19	3:30 p.m.	Kent State	Doyt Perry Stadium; Bowling Green, OH (Anniversary Award)	ESPN+	W 27–6	20,858
October 26	3:30 p.m.	at Toledo	Glass Bowl; Toledo, OH (Battle of I-75)	ESPN+	W 41–26	29,697
November 5	7:30 p.m.	at Central Michigan	Kelly/Shorts Stadium; Mount Pleasant, MI	ESPN2	W 23–13	7,832
November 12	7:00 p.m.	Western Michigan	Doyt Perry Stadium; Bowling Green, OH	ESPN2	W 31–13	8,461
November 23	2:00 p.m.	at Ball State	Scheumann Stadium; Muncie, IN	ESPN+	W 38–13	7,116
November 29	12:00 p.m.	Miami (OH)	Doyt Perry Stadium; Bowling Green, OH	ESPNU	L 12–28	9,345
December 26	9:00 p.m.	vs. Arkansas State*	Hancock Whitney Stadium; Mobile, AL (68 Ventures Bowl)	ESPN	L 31–38	19,582
*Non-conference game; ^{†}Homecoming; Rankings from AP Poll and CFP Rankings released prior to game; All times are in Eastern time

== Offseason ==
=== Transfers ===
Outgoing
Player	Position	Destination
Andrew Bench	TE	South Alabama
Davion Daniels	DB	Slippery Rock
Cashius Howell	EDGE	Texas A&M
Jalen Huskey	CB	Maryland
Abdul-Fatai Ibrahim	WR	LA Tech
Ta'ron Keith	RB	Western Kentucky

Incoming
Player	Position	Transferred From
Ja'Corey Benjamin	DB	Texas Southern
CJ Brown	DB	Northern Illinois
Justin Eklund	LB	San Jose State
RJ Garcia II	WR	Kansas State
Malcom Johnson Jr.	WR	Auburn
Zach Long	K	Troy
Nick Reimer	OL	Merrimack
Edward Rhambo	DB	Northern Arizona
Donny Stephens	LB	Oklahoma State
Elijah Boyd	TE	UTEP
Todd Bumphis	DB	Cincinnati
Justin Pegues	RB	Tennessee Tech
Darius McClendon	S	Florida Atlantic
Blane Cleaver	TE	Army

== Roster ==
2024 Bowling Green Falcons football team roster
Players
Coaches
Offense

Pos.	#	Name	Class
TE	0	Harold Fannin Jr.	Jr
WR	1	Malcolm Johnson Jr.	Sr
WR	2	RJ Garcia II	Jr
QB	3	Lucian Anderson III	Fr
RB	4	Terion Stewart	Jr
WR	5	Jaylon Tillman	Sr
RB	6	Jamal Johnson	Sr
QB	7	Connor Bazelak	Sr
QB	8	Baron May	Jr
TE	9	Isaac Hill	Fr
TE	10	Levi Gazarek (C)	Sr
WR	11	Finn Hogan	Jr
QB	12	Camden Orth	Sr
WR	13	Cynceir McNeal	Fr
QB	14	Jonny Sorensen	Fr
WR	15	Caleb Goodloe	Fr
WR	16	Rahkeem Smith	Jr
WR	17	Trey Johnson	So
WR	18	Winn Sharp	Fr
WR	19	Shawn Thigpen	Fr
RB	20	Justin Pegues	Jr
RB	21	Chris Edmonds	Fr
RB	22	Nakai Amachree	Fr
RB	23	Jaden Copening	Fr
RB	24	Bryce DeFalco	Fr
RB	25	Mar'Kel Porter	Fr
RB	26	Cameron Pettaway	Fr
RB	28	Jaison Patterson	Sr
RB	30	PaSean Wimberly (injured) (C)	Sr
OT	50	Alex Wollschlaeger (C)	Sr
OT	51	Dillon Robinson	Fr
OT	52	Nick Reimer	Sr
OT	53	Billie Roberts	Sr
C	54	Brody Bolyn	Fr
OT	55	Tunde Fatukasi	Sr
G	57	Alex Padgett	Jr
C	65	Jake Burns	Sr
OT	70	Alex Harris	Fr
OT	71	Rico Steele	Fr
C/OG	72	Cade Zimmerly	Jr
OT	75	Nate Pabst	Jr
G	77	James Thomas Jr.	Fr
TE	80	Ocean Brabbs	Fr
TE	81	Eliijah Boyd	Jr
TE	82	Eli Jacon-Duffy	Fr
WR	83	Pierce St Geme	Fr
WR	84	Dom Grguric	Jr
TE	85	Caden Campbell	Fr
TE	86	Ian Drummond	Sr
WR	87	Jared Merk	Fr
TE	88	Jacob Harris	Fr
TE	89	Blane Cleaver	Jr

Defense

Pos.	#	Name	Class
CB	0	Darius McClendon	Sr
CB	1	Jordan Oladokun (C)	Sr
ILB	2	Brock Horne (C)	Sr
ILB	3	Joseph Sipp Jr.	Jr
CB	4	Edward Rhambo	So
DL	5	Anthony Hawkins (C)	Sr
S	6	CJ Brown	Jr
CB	7	Jacorey Benjamin	Sr
S	8	Trent Simms	Sr
S	9	Darius Lorfils	Jr
ILB	10	Donny Stephens	Jr
OLB	11	Demetrius Hardamon	Sr
S	12	Tracy Revels	Jr
OLB	13	Charles Rosser	Sr
OLB	15	Avi McGary	Sr
DL	16	Chace Davis	Sr
DL	17	Bam Booker	So
CB	18	Jalen Burton	Sr
OLB	19	Alijah Williams	Fr
S	20	TJ Nelson	Fr
CB	21	Todd Bumphis	Sr
CB	22	Kal-El Pascal	Fr
OLB	23	Myles Bradley	So
OLB	24	Justin Eklund	So
CB	25	Jace Henry	Fr
OLB	27	Coleman Teasdale	Fr
S	28	Victor Vazquez	Jr
ILB	30	Dorian Pringle	Fr
S	31	D'kyah Banks	Fr
S	32	Patrick Day	Sr
DL	33	Jordan Porter	Sr
OLB	34	Elias Owens	Fr
ILB	36	Jabari Mitchell	Fr
CB	37	Garrison Blair	Fr
DL	38	Dierre Kelly	Sr
ILB	39	Henry Reifschneider	Fr
S	41	Josira Andrews	Fr
ILB	42	Chris Williams	Sr
DL	43	Martreece Dillard	Fr
ILB	44	David Afogho	Fr
ILB	46	Devin Taborn	Fr
DL	55	Evan Branch-Haynes	Jr
DL	56	Ian van der Merwe	So
DL	57	Dayln White	Fr
DL	60	Dontrez Brown	Sr
DL	90	Davonte Miles	So
DL	95	Joe Shimko	Fr
DL	98	Malik Moses	Fr
DL	99	Ali Saad	Sr

Special teams

Pos.	#	Name	Class
K	14	Jackson Kleather	So
P	19	John Henderson	Jr
PK	40	Ethan Warner	So
LS	41	Quillan Jimenez	Fr
K	46	Zach Long	Jr
LS	47	George Carlson	Jr
PK	85	Travis Kenner	Fr
K	98	Alan Anaya	Jr

Head coach

- Scot Loeffler

Coordinators/assistant coaches

- Steve Morrison – Co-Defensive Coordinator / Inside Linebackers
- Sammy Lawanson – Co-Defensive Coordinator / Outside Linebackers
- Greg Nosal – Co-Offensive Coordinator / Run Game Coordinator / Offensive Line
- Max Warner – Co-Offensive Coordinator / Quarterbacks
- Alex Bayer – Special Teams Coordinator / Tight Ends
- Erik Campbell – Passing Game Coordinator / Wide Receivers
- Derrick Jackson – Defensive Pass Game Coordinator / Secondary
- Robert Armand – Assistant Coach / Cornerbacks
- Cornell Brown – Assistant Coach / Defensive Line
- Brian White – Assistant Coach / Running Backs
- Kevin Tolbert – Head Football Sports Performance Coach
- Brandon Palidar – Associate Head Football Strength & Conditioning Coach
- Grant Strock – Offensive Graduate Assistant
- Brady Thomas – Defensive Quality Control
- Johnny Caughman – Defensive Quality Control
- Jack McCarthy – Offensive Quality Control

Legend

- (C) Team captain
- (S) Suspended
- (I) Ineligible
- Injured
- Redshirt

Roster
Last update: August 29, 2024

== Game summaries ==
=== vs. Fordham (FCS) ===
Game One – Fordham Rams (FCS) (0–0) at Bowling Green Falcons (0–0) – Game summary

Quarter	1	2	3	4	Total
Rams (FCS)	0	3	7	7	17
Falcons	20	7	7	7	41

at Doyt Perry Stadium • Bowling Green, OH

- Date: Thursday, August 29, 2024
- Game time: 7:00 PM
- Game weather: Temperature: 82 °F (28 °C) • Wind: SE at 9 miles per hour (14 km/h) • Weather: Cloudy
- Game attendance: 12,786
- Referee: Rich Edwards
- TV announcers (ESPN+): Joey Lindstrom (play-by-play) and Ryan Cavanaugh (analyst)

Game information

First quarter

- 14:48 BGSU – Justin Pegues 100-yard kickoff return (Jackson Kleather kick failed) – Bowling Green 6–0.
- 8:20 BGSU – Terion Stewart 7-yard run (Jackson Kleather kick) – Bowling Green 13–0. Drive: 10 plays, 78 yards, 4:39.
- 0:09 BGSU – Lucian Anderson III 13-yard run (Jackson Kleather kick) – Bowling Green 20–0. Drive: 8 plays, 93 yards, 3:38.

Second quarter

- 9:54 BGSU – Connor Bazelak 8-yard run (Jackson Kleather kick) – Bowling Green 27–0. Drive: 8 plays, 38 yards, 4:10.
- 0:00 FORD – Bennett Henderson 24-yard field goal – Bowling Green 27–3. Drive: 13 plays, 74 yards, 5:16.

Third quarter

- 13:35 FORD – Cole Thornton 30-yard pass from C. J. Montes (Bennett Henderson kick) – Bowling Green 27–10. Drive: 4 plays, 75 yards, 1:25.
- 1:21 BGSU – Terion Stewart 7-yard run (Jackson Kleather kick) – Bowling Green 34–10. Drive: 13 plays, 94 yards, 5:34.

Fourth quarter

- 7:28 BGSU – Terion Stewart 73-yard run (Jackson Kleather kick) – Bowling Green 41–10. Drive: 3 plays, 86 yards, 1:23.
- 0:24 FORD – Jack Batten 60-yard pass from Jack Capaldi (Bennett Henderson kick) – Bowling Green 41–17. Drive: 7 plays, 95 yards, 2:24.

Bowling Green opened its season with a 41–17 victory on August 29 against the Fordham Rams in front of 12,786 at Doyt Perry Stadium. Tennessee Tech transfer Justin Pegues returned the game's opening kickoff 100-yards for a touchdown, breaking the school record for the longest kick return. Running back Terion Stewart ran for 161 yards and three touchdowns, matching his career high. Running back Jaison Patterson surpassed 1,000 career rushing yards in his career, becoming the 40th Falcon to do so.

Statistics	FORD	BGSU
First downs	18	22
Plays–yards	65–401	56–475
Rushes–yards	42–182	33–305
Passing yards	219	170
Passing: Comp–Att–Int	14–23–0	16–23–0
Time of possession	32:37	27:23

Team	Category	Player	Statistics
Fordham	Passing	C. J. Montes	13/21, 159 yards, TD
Fordham	Rushing	Julius Loughridge	16 carries, 112 yards
Fordham	Receiving	Julius Loughridge	4 receptions, 66 yards
Bowling Green	Passing	Connor Bazelak	15/22, 168 yards
Bowling Green	Rushing	Terion Stewart	14 carries, 161 yards, 3TD
Bowling Green	Receiving	Harold Fannin Jr.	6 receptions, 67 yards

=== At No. 8 Penn State ===
Bowling Green Falcons (1–0) at No. 8 Penn State Nittany Lions (1–0) – Game summary

Quarter	1	2	3	4	Total
Falcons	10	14	0	3	27
No. 8 Nittany Lions	7	13	7	7	34

at Beaver Stadium • University Park, Pennsylvania

- Date: September 7, 2024
- Game time: 12:00 p.m.
- Game weather: Temperature: 64 °F (18 °C) • Wind: NW at 15 miles per hour (24 km/h) • Weather: Sunny
- Game attendance: 103,861
- Referee: Larry Smith
- TV announcers (BTN): Chris Vosters (play-by-play), Matt Millen (analyst), and Dannie Rodgers (sideline)

Game information

First quarter

- 12:39 BGSU – Harold Fannin Jr. 6-yard pass from Connor Bazelak (Jackson Kleather kick) – Bowling Green 7–0. Drive: 6 plays, 75 yards, 2:21.
- 10:14 PSU – Drew Allar 5-yard run (Sander Sahaydak kick) – Tied 7–7. Drive: 6 plays, 75 yards, 2:25.
- 4:50 BGSU – Jackson Kleather 33-yard field goal – Bowling Green 10–7. Drive: 10 plays, 60 yards, 5:24.

Second quarter

- 12:48 BGSU – Malcolm Johnson Jr. 15-yard pass from Connor Bazelak (Jackson Kleather kick) – Bowling Green 17–7. Drive: 10 plays, 73 yards, 5:43.
- 11:48 PSU – Omari Evans 29-yard pass from Drew Allar (Sander Sahaydak kick) – Bowling Green 17–14. Drive: 3 plays, 75 yards, 1:00.
- 5:28 PSU – Sander Sahaydak 43-yard field goal – Tied 17–17. Drive: 6 plays, 19 yards, 3:01.
- 3:32 BGSU – Jamal Johnson 41-yard run (Jackson Kleather kick) – Bowling Green 24–17. Drive: 4 plays, 75 yards, 1:56.
- 0:10 PSU – Sander Sahaydak 28-yard field goal – Bowling Green 24–20. Drive: 10 plays, 64 yards, 3:22.

Third quarter

- 6:13 PSU – Nicholas Singleton 14-yard pass from Drew Allar (Sander Sahaydak kick) – Penn State 27–24. Drive: 8 plays, 85 yards, 4:07.

Fourth quarter

- 4:09 PSU – Nicholas Singleton 41-yard run (Sander Sahaydak kick) – Penn State 34–24. Drive: 1 play, 41 yards, :07.
- 0:47 BGSU – Jackson Kleather 42-yard field goal – Penn State 34–27. Drive: 9 plays, 41 yards, 3:22.

On September 7, Bowling Green visited Beaver Stadium to take on the number 8 ranked Penn State Nittany Lions. The game was the third all-time meeting between the Falcons and Nittany Lions, with the Nittany Lions having won each of their previous two meetings. The Falcons were without starting running back Terion Stewart who was injured in the week one game against Fordham. The game had an attendance of 103,861.

Bowling Green lost the game 27–34. The game began with Penn State winning the coin toss and deferring to the second half. On the Falcons opening drive, quarterback Connor Bazelak connected with Harold Fannin Jr. on a 6-yard touchdown pass to start the scoring. The opening drive touchdown snapped Penn State's streak of 28 games not allowing an opponent to score a first-drive touchdown. Heading into the matchup, it was the longest streak in the nation. The Falcons scored on their first three drives of the game, building them a 17–7 lead. At the half, Bowling Green led Penn State 24–20. The Nittany Lions earned their first lead of the game midway through the third quarter when quarterback Drew Allar found Nicholas Singleton on a 14-yard touchdown pass. Singleton added to the lead in the fourth quarter on a 41-yard touchdown run. In the final minute, Bowling Green kicker Jackson Kleather made his second field goal of the game, making it just a one score advantage for the Nittany Lions. The Falcons were unsuccessful on their onside kick attempt, allowing Penn State to run out the clock.

Fannin Jr. led the Falcons with 11 receptions and 137 receiving yards, which both marked career-highs. He became the 43rd Falcon to reach 1,000 career receiving yards. Running back Jaison Patterson had 57 yards on 16 carries filling in for the injured Stewart. Jamal Johnson also made an impact with a 41-yard touchdown run, his first collegiate rushing touchdown.

Statistics	BGSU	PSU
First downs	20	21
Plays–yards	66–375	57–438
Rushes–yards	26–121	37–234
Passing yards	254	204
Passing: comp–att–int	25–40–2	13–20–1
Turnovers	2	1
Time of possession	32:00	28:00

Team	Category	Player	Statistics
Bowling Green	Passing	Connor Bazelak	25/39, 254 yards, 2 TD, 2 INT
Bowling Green	Rushing	Jaison Patterson	16 carries, 57 yards
Bowling Green	Receiving	Harold Fannin Jr.	11 receptions, 137 yards, TD
Penn State	Passing	Drew Allar	13/20, 204 yards, 2 TD, INT
Penn State	Rushing	Nicholas Singleton	13 carries, 119 yards, TD
Penn State	Receiving	Tyler Warren	8 receptions, 146 yards

=== At No. 25 Texas A&M ===
Bowling Green Falcons (1–1) at No. 25 Texas A&M Aggies (2–1) – Game summary

Quarter	1	2	3	4	Total
Falcons	0	3	14	3	20
No. 25 Aggies	7	6	7	6	26

at Kyle Field • College Station, Texas

- Date: September 21, 2024
- Game time: 7:30 p.m.
- Game weather: Temperature: 93 °F (34 °C) • Wind: SE at 11 miles per hour (18 km/h) • Weather: Sunny
- Game attendance: 99,523
- Referee: David Smith
- TV announcers (SECN+/ESPN+): Jay Alter (play-by-play), Rocky Boiman (analyst), and Ashley Stroehlein (sideline)

Game information

First quarter

- 10:04 TAMU – Theo Melin Öhrström 27-yard pass from Marcel Reed (Randy Bond kick) – Texas A&M 7–0. Drive: 11 plays, 75 yards, 4:56.

Second quarter

- 13:35 BGSU – Jackson Kleather 33-yard field goal – Texas A&M 7–3. Drive: 7 plays, 36 yards, 2:10.
- 10:17 TAMU – Randy Bond 28-yard field goal – Texas A&M 10–3. Drive: 7 plays, 33 yards, 2:28.
- 0:02 TAMU – Randy Bond 29-yard field goal – Texas A&M 13–3. Drive: 18 plays, 77 yards, 6:14.

Third quarter

- 14:48 BGSU – Harold Fannin Jr. 65-yard pass from Connor Bazelak (Jackson Kleather kick) – Texas A&M 13–10. Drive: 1 play, 65 yards, 0:12.
- 10:43 TAMU – Jahdae Walker 5-yard pass from Marcel Reed (Randy Bond kick) – Texas A&M 20–10. Drive: 8 plays, 75 yards, 4:05.
- 5:24 BGSU – Rahkeem Smith 40-yard run (Jackson Kleather kick) – Texas A&M 20–17. Drive: 9 plays, 81 yards, 5:13.

Fourth quarter

- 12:56 TAMU – Randy Bond 34-yard field goal – Texas A&M 23–17. Drive: 12 plays, 64 yards, 4:01.
- 7:15 TAMU – Randy Bond 42-yard field goal – Texas A&M 26–17. Drive: 9 plays, 50 yards, 4:20.
- 0:38 BGSU – Jackson Kleather 23-yard field goal – Texas A&M 26–20. Drive: 6 plays, 30 yards, 0:54.

The Bowling Green Falcons traveled to College Station to take on the number 25 ranked Texas A&M Aggies. The Falcons played their second ranked opponent of the season in as many games played. This was the first matchup between the Falcons and Aggies. The Aggies are led by head coach Mike Elko, who previously spent five seasons as Bowling Green's defensive coordinator from 2009 to 2013. Aggies defensive lineman Cashius Howell spent the 2021–2023 seasons at Bowling Green. He previously was named third team All-MAC in 2023 after leading the Falcons with 9.5 sacks, which was tied for first in the MAC and 16th nationally. Howell recorded his first sack with the Aggies in a 33–20 victory over Florida the previous week. Aggies freshman quarterback Marcel Reed started in place for the injured Conner Weigman in the win over the Gators.

The game had an attendance of 99,523. The Falcons won the coin toss and deferred to the second half. Texas A&M then went on an 11 plays 75-yard touchdown drive. Starting quarterback Marcel Reed found Theo Melin Öhrström on a 27-yard touchdown pass. This was Reed's second consecutive start filling in for the injured Conner Weigman. The Falcons trailed 3–13 entering the half time break. Bowling Green quarterback Connor Bazelak connected with Harold Fannin Jr. on a 65-yard touchdown on the first play from scrimmage to cut the Aggies' lead to just three points. The Aggies responded with a scoring drive of its own when Reed threw his second touchdown pass of the game, this time to Jahdae Walker. For the second consecutive possession, the Falcons answered with a touchdown drive. Backup quarterback Lucian Anderson III checked into the game where he handed the ball off to running back Terion Stewart, who then flipped the ball in reverse to wide receiver Rahkeem Smith for a 40-yard touchdown. After a Texas A&M three-and-out, cornerback Darius McClendon blocked the Aggies punt inside their own 8-yard line. Looking to tie the game, kicker Jackson Kleather missed a 28-yard field goal. The Aggies then scored fields goals on back to back possessions to increase the lead to 26–17. With under two minutes remaining, Bazelak's pass was intercepted in the endzone by Marcus Ratcliffe. However, on the Aggies first play, Bowling Green linebacker Brock Horne forced a fumble that was recovered by Edward Rhambo. Kleather connected on a 23-yard field goal, making it once again a one score game. The Falcons would not be able to convert on an onside kick attempt, allowing Texas A&M to run out the remainder of the clock.

Bowling Green tight end Harold Fannin Jr. had a game high 145 yards on eight receptions and one touchdown. It was his second consecutive 100-yard game against a Top 25 team. For his performance he was named MAC Offensive Player of the Week.

Statistics	BGSU	TAMU
First downs	17	21
Plays–yards	60–339	72–410
Rushes–yards	23–89	43–237
Passing yards	250	173
Passing: comp–att–int	20–37–1	16–29–0
Turnovers	1	1
Time of possession	26:26	33:34

Team	Category	Player	Statistics
Bowling Green	Passing	Connor Bazelak	20/36, 250 yards, TD, INT
Bowling Green	Rushing	Terion Stewart	13 carries, 42 yards
Bowling Green	Receiving	Harold Fannin Jr.	8 receptions, 145 yards, TD
Texas A&M	Passing	Marcel Reed	16/29, 173 yards, 2 TD
Texas A&M	Rushing	Marcel Reed	12 carries, 91 yards
Texas A&M	Receiving	Jahdae Walker	3 receptions, 45 yards, TD

=== vs Old Dominion ===
Old Dominion Monarchs (0–3) vs Bowling Green Falcons (1–2) – Game summary

Quarter	1	2	3	4	Total
Monarchs	14	3	0	13	30
Falcons	7	7	7	6	27

at Doyt Perry Stadium • Bowling Green, OH

- Date: September 28, 2024
- Game time: 5:00 p.m.
- Game weather: Cloudy/Light rain • Temperature: 67 °F (19 °C) • Wind: SSW at 10 miles per hour (16 km/h)
- Game attendance: 19,140
- Referee: Steven Robinson
- TV announcers (ESPN+): Jason Ross Jr. (play-by-play) and Tyoka Jackson (analyst)

Game information

First quarter

- (11:57) ODU – Pat Conroy 9 yard pass from Grant Wilson, Ethan Sanchez kick (Drive: 8 plays, 75 yards, 3:03; ODU 7–0)
- (0:31) BGSU – Harold Fannin Jr. 18 yard pass from Connor Bazelak, Jackson Kleather kick (Drive: 10 plays, 76 yards, 5:19; Tied 7–7)
- (0:20) ODU – Pat Conroy 75 yard pass from Grant Wilson, Ethan Sanchez kick (Drive: 1 play, 75 yards, 0:11; ODU 14–7)

Second quarter

- (10:22) BGSU – Jaison Patterson 17 yard run, Jackson Kleather kick (Drive: 9 plays, 81 yards, 4:54; Tied 14–14)
- (8:33) ODU – Ethan Sanchez 53 yard field goal (Drive: 7 plays, 39 yards, 1:49; ODU 17–14)

Third quarter

- (11:34) BGSU – Harold Fannin Jr. 59 yard pass from Connor Bazelak, Jackson Kleather kick (Drive: 2 plays, 59 yards, 0:56; BGSU 21–17)

Fourth quarter

- (11:57) ODU – Colton Joseph 14 yard run, Ethan Sanchez kick failed (Drive: 2 plays, 20 yards, 0:42; ODU 23–21)
- (3:01) BGSU – Terion Stewart 13 yard run, Two-point conversion failed (Drive: 8 plays, 44 yards, 5:06; BGSU 27–23)
- (0:24) ODU – Aaron Young 4 yard run, Ethan Sanchez kick (Drive: 13 plays, 79 yards, 2:31; ODU 30–27)

Statistics	ODU	BGSU
First downs	16	23
Plays–yards	63–333	70–399
Rushes–yards	36–189	33–96
Passing yards	144	303
Passing: comp–att–int	12–27–0	27–36–1
Turnovers	0	1
Time of possession	21:44	38:16

Team	Category	Player	Statistics
Old Dominion	Passing	Grant Wilson	6/14, 118 yards, 2 TD
Old Dominion	Rushing	Aaron Young	12 carries, 74 yards, TD
Old Dominion	Receiving	Pat Conroy	3 receptions, 99 yards, 2 TD
Bowling Green	Passing	Connor Bazelak	27/36, 303 yards, 2 TD, INT
Bowling Green	Rushing	Terion Stewart	20 carries, 67 yards, TD
Bowling Green	Receiving	Harold Fannin Jr.	12 receptions, 193 yards, 2 TD

Old Dominion came to Bowling Green with a 0–3 record as they had one possession losses to South Carolina and East Carolina. Following a loss to Virginia Tech, the Monarchs were fresh off of a bye week. This was the first matchup between the Falcons and Monarchs.

With Bowling Green winning the coin toss and deferring to the second half, Old Dominion quarterback Grant Wilson led the Monarchs on an eight play 75-yard drive that resulted in a Pat Conroy 9-yard touchdown catch. Following a Falcons turnover on downs at midfield and a Monarchs punt, Bowling Green quarterback Connor Bazelak engineered a 10 play 76-yard drive that ended in an 18-yard touchdown pass to Harold Fannin Jr. On the first play of Old Dominion's next drive, Wilson faked a quarterback draw and found Conroy wide open on a 75-yard touchdown. The Orange and Brown responded on its next possession with a Jaison Patterson 17-yard touchdown, his first of the season. Old Dominion led at the break, 17–14.

Early in the third quarter, the Falcons earned its first lead when Bazelak found Fannin Jr. on a 65-yard touchdown reception for his second touchdown. On the Monarchs second possession of the second half, Wilson was replaced by redshirt freshman quarterback Colton Joseph. Joseph started the Monarchs' previous game against the Hookies, but was benched in favor of true freshman Quinn Henicle. Following a Bazelak interception, Joseph found the end zone on a 14-yard scramble, giving the Monarchs a 23–21 lead after a missed extra point with 11:57 remaining. Following back-to-back punts, the Falcons once again took the lead, this time coming on a Terion Stewart 13-yard touchdown run. With under three minutes remaining, Joseph took the Monarchs on a 13 play 79-yard touchdown drive that included a fourth down conversion on its own 40-yard line. The game winning touchdown was scored with just 24 seconds remaining on a 4-yard touchdown run by Aaron Young. The ensuing Falcons drive got as far as their own 40-yard line before running out of time. Bowling Green's homecoming was spoiled, and they ended their non conference schedule with a 1–3 record.

Fannin Jr. set a career-high with 12 receptions and 193 receiving yards in the loss. He also set a school record for single game receiving yards by a tight end, passing Mark Dowdell's 1983 record of 175 yards. His two touchdowns also broke Bowling Green's career record for receiving touchdowns by a tight end. For the third consecutive game, Fannin surpassed his career high in receiving yards. For the second consecutive week he was named Mackey Award and MAC Offensive Player of the Week.

=== At Akron ===
Bowling Green Falcons (1–3) at Akron Zips (1–4) – Game summary

Quarter	1	2	3	4	Total
Falcons	7	10	0	10	27
Zips	10	0	0	10	20

at InfoCision Stadium • Akron, Ohio

- Date: October 5, 2024
- Game time: 3:30 p.m.
- Game weather: Sunny • Temperature: 76 °F (24 °C)
- Game attendance: 9,337
- Referee: Jeremy Valentine
- TV announcers (ESPN+): Anthony Lima (play-by-play) and Ryan Cavanaugh (analyst)

Game information

First quarter

- (7:03) BGSU – Jaison Patterson 2-yard run, Jackson Kleather kick (Drive: 5 plays, 96 yards, 2:42; BGSU 7–0)
- (4:31) AKR – Garrison Smith 47-yard field goal (Drive: 6 plays, 45 yards, 2:32; BGSU 7–3)
- (0:00) AKR – Liam Reardon recovered fumbled punt in end zone, Garrison Smith kick (AKR 10–7)

Second quarter

- (1:55) BGSU – Jackson Kleather 45-yard field goal (Drive: 16 plays, 64 yards, 8:12; Tied 10–10)
- (0:22) BGSU – Jaison Patterson 9-yard run, Jackson Kleather kick (Drive: 5 plays, 41 yards, 1:11; BGSU 17–10)

Third quarter

No scoring plays

Fourth quarter

- (14:56) BGSU – Jackson Kleather 31-yard field goal (Drive: 13 plays, 85 yards, 7:39; BGSU 20–10)
- (13:13) AKR – Tahj Bullock 5-yard run, Garrison Smith kick (Drive: 3 plays, 75 yards, 1:43; BGSU 20–17)
- (7:13) AKR – Garrison Smith 38-yard field goal (Drive: 8 plays, 59 yards, 4:20; Tied 20–20)
- (2:39) BGSU – Harold Fannin Jr. 31-yard run, Jackson Kleather kick (Drive: 11 plays, 70 yards, 4:27; BGSU 27–20)

Statistics	BGSU	AKR
First downs	20	15
Plays–yards	66–386	54–321
Rushes–yards	36–118	22–115
Passing yards	268	206
Passing: comp–att–int	24–30–0	21–32–0
Turnovers	1	0
Time of possession	34:58	25:02

Team	Category	Player	Statistics
Bowling Green	Passing	Connor Bazelak	24/30, 268 yards
Bowling Green	Rushing	Jaison Patterson	18 carries, 52 yards, 2 TD
Bowling Green	Receiving	Harold Fannin Jr.	9 receptions, 135 yards
Akron	Passing	Ben Finley	21/32, 206 yards
Akron	Rushing	Jordan Simmons	9 carries, 73 yards
Akron	Receiving	Adrian Norton	3 receptions, 78 yards

Bowling Green opened MAC conference play as they traveled to Akron for their homecoming. Bowling Green won the matchup 27–20, earning its 300th all-time win in MAC play. The Falcons advanced to 21–10 all-time against the Zips.

Akron's first possession was halted when Bowling Green linebacker Charles Rosser sacked quarterback Ben Finley. Finley fumbled the ball that was then recovered by a Zips player, resulting in a 15-yard loss. Following a 46-yard punt, Bowling Green started its first possession on its own four yard line. Quarterback Connor Bazelak connected with tight end Harold Fannin Jr. for 63 yards on its first offensive play of the game. Fannin Jr. siff-armed and hurled defenders down to the Akron 33 yard line. Five plays later, running back Jaison Patterson scored untouched on a 2-yard run. Patterson notched his second start of the season, replacing injured starter Terion Stewart. Stewart was inactive for the second time in the last four games. On the last play of the first quarter, leading 7–3, punt returner Justin Pegues muffed Akron's punt that was then recovered in the end zone by a defender, giving the Zips a 10–7 lead. After back-to-back punts by both teams, Bazelak orchestrated a 16 play, 64-yard drive that resulted in a Jackson Kleather career-long 45-yard field goal. The Falcons defense then caused a Zips three and out, resulting in another punt. Starting its drive on Akron's 41-yard line with under two minutes remaining in the half, Bazelak completed three straight passes inside the redzone. Patterson then had two consecutive carries, scoring on a 9-yard run on the second.

Both teams first possession of the second half stalled, resulting in punts. On the Orange and Brown's second possession, Jackson Kleather made a 31-yard field goal that gave the Falcons a 20–10 lead with 14:56 remaining. The 14 play drive took nearly eight minutes of game time off of the clock and was the second drive of the game for over 80 yards. Leading by two possessions, Akron answered quickly when Finley completed a 48-yard pass to wide receiver Adrian Norton on the first play of its next drive. The next play, Finley found receiver Bobby Golden who was tackled at the five yard line. The following play, backup quarterback Tahj Bullock checked into the game and scored on a keeper. After a Bowling Green three and out, Akron tied the game on its next drive with a Garrison Smith 38-yard field goal. With the score tied 20–20, the Falcons were faced with a 4th-and-2 on Akron's 31 yard line. Following a Bowling Green timeout, Fannin Jr. took an end-around where he evaded Zips defenders for a 31-yard score. Akron's proceeding drive faced a 4th-and-9 on Bowling Green's 17 yard line with under a minute remaining. Facing pass rush, Finley's pass sailed incomplete in the end zone intended to receiver Ahmarian Granger. Bowling Green was then able to run out the clock, advancing to 1–0 in MAC play.

Fannin Jr. finished with a game high nine receptions for 135 yards. This continued his program record with his fourth consecutive 100 yard game. For his performance he was named MAC Offensive Player of the Week for the third consecutive week. Since 1956, Fannin Jr. is one of four tight ends in FBS that have notched over 1,500 yards receiving, 11 receiving touchdowns and five or more rushing touchdowns.

=== vs Northern Illinois ===
Northern Illinois Huskies (3–2) vs Bowling Green Falcons (2–3) – Game summary

Quarter	1	2	3	4	Total
Huskies	3	3	0	11	17
Falcons	7	0	0	0	7

at Doyt Perry Stadium • Bowling Green, Ohio

- Date: October 12, 2024
- Game time: 3:30 p.m.
- Game weather: Cloudy • Temperature: 70 °F (21 °C) • Wind: NE at 8 miles per hour (13 km/h)
- Game attendance: 9,559
- Referee: Billy Williams
- TV announcers (ESPN+): Jason Ross Jr. (play-by-play) and Tyoka Jackson (analyst)

Game information

First quarter

- (8:58) NIU – Kanon Woodill 46-yard field goal (Drive: 10 plays, 46 yards, 6:02; NIU 3–0)
- (6:55) BGSU – Harold Fannin Jr. 11-yard pass from Connor Bazelak, Jackson Kleather kick (Drive: 5 plays, 75 yards, 2:03; BGSU 7–3)

Second quarter

- (1:40) NIU – Kanon Woodill 21-yard field goal (Drive: 13 plays, 54 yards, 4:18; BGSU 7–6)

Third quarter

No scoring plays

Fourth quarter

- (14:53) NIU – Josh Holst 22-yard run, Isaac Hatfield Two-point pass (Drive: 7 plays, 46 yards, 3:46; NIU 14–7)
- (6:00) NIU – Kanon Woodill 27-yard field goal (Drive: 12 plays, 59 yards, 5:43; NIU 17–7)

Statistics	NIU	BGSU
First downs	19	15
Plays–yards	73–278	56–205
Rushes–yards	52–170	33–107
Passing yards	108	98
Passing: comp–att–int	15–21–0	10–23–1
Turnovers	0	2
Time of possession	34:44	25:16

Team	Category	Player	Statistics
Northern Illinois	Passing	Josh Holst, Ethan Hampton	10/14, 89 yards 5/7, 19 yards
Northern Illinois	Rushing	Gavin Williams	29 carries, 102 yards
Northern Illinois	Receiving	Andrew McElroy	5 receptions, 47 yards
Bowling Green	Passing	Connor Bazelak, Lucian Anderson III	8/14, 88 yards, TD; 2/9, 10 yards, INT
Bowling Green	Rushing	Terion Stewart	13 carries, 64 yards
Bowling Green	Receiving	Jamal Johnson	3 receptions, 43 yards

The Falcons hosted the Huskies for their sixth game of the season. Northern Illinois came to Doyt stadium with an eventful start of the season. After crushing FCS opponent Western Illinois, they surprised the nation by defeating number 5 ranked Notre Dame 16–14 on the road at Notre Dame Stadium. After a bye week, they were ranked 23 in the country before dropping their conference opener to Buffalo in overtime. The following week, they lost by a touchdown on the road to NC State. The Huskies then defeated UMass 34–20, bringing its record to 3–2 to face the Falcons. Starting running back Antario Brown was injured in the victory over the Minutemen and would not play against the Falcons.

Bowling Green won the coin toss for the fourth consecutive week and elected to defer. Huskies' quarterback Ethan Hampton led a 10 play 46 yard drive that resulted in a Kanon Woodill 46-yard field goal. The Falcons then marched right down the field on a five play 75 yard drive that resulted in a Harold Fannin Jr. 11-yard touchdown reception from quarterback Connor Bazelak. Northern Illinois next drive was stopped on downs at the Bowling Green 39 yard line. Looking to capitalize, the Falcons drove down to the Huskies 24 yard line, but kicker Jackson Kleather missed on a 42-yard field goal attempt. With just over nine minutes remaining in the half, Bazelak was sacked on strip-fumble. The fumble set up the Huskies inside Bowling Green's 10 yard line. On second and goal, Hampton would take a hit that caused him to miss the remainder of the game on a quarterback keeper. Following an incomplete pass by backup quarterback Josh Holst on third and goal, Bowling Green defensive lineman Ali Saad blocked the Huskies 24-yard field goal attempt. Following a Falcons three and out, Holst took the Huskies on a 13 play 54 yard drive that resulted in a 21-yard field goal by Woodill. Late in the first half, Bazelak was sacked and sustained a lower body injury that significantly hindered his mobility. The Falcons led at the break 7–6.

On the Orange and Brown's first possession of the second half, they drove the ball down inside the Huskies 10 yard line, but could not convert. Backup kicker Zach Long's 27-yard field goal was nullified by an offensive penalty. Long then missed a 32-yard attempt the following play. With just under six minutes remaining in the third quarter, Bazelak was removed from the game after showing continued discomfort. Following a Falcons punt, Holst took the Huskies on its first touchdown drive of the game where he scampered in from 22 yards out. After a converted two-point conversion attempt, the Huskies led 14–7 with 14:53 remaining. Backup quarterback Lucian Anderson III struggled to move the ball and did not pick up a first down without a penalty until his final possession under center. The Huskies tacked onto its lead with Woodill's third field goal of the game with six minutes remaining to round out the scoring. The Huskies and Falcons both advanced to 1–1 in MAC play.

Bazelak became the 41st player in FBS history to reach 1,000 completions.

=== vs Kent State (Anniversary Award) ===
Kent State Golden Flashes (0–6) vs Bowling Green Falcons (2–4) – Game summary

Quarter	1	2	3	4	Total
Golden Flashes	3	3	0	0	6
Falcons	10	10	0	7	27

at Doyt Perry Stadium • Bowling Green, Ohio

- Date: October 19, 2024
- Game time: 3:30 p.m.
- Game weather: Sunny • Temperature: 75 °F (24 °C) • Wind: W at 5 miles per hour (8.0 km/h)
- Game attendance: 20,858
- Referee: Greg Sujack
- TV announcers (ESPN+): Jim Barbar (play-by-play) and Randy Buffington (analyst)

Game information

First quarter

- (5:29) BGSU – Zach Long 32-yard field goal (Drive: 9 plays, 84 yards, 4:37; BGSU 3–0)
- (3:15) KSU – Will Hryszko 37-yard field goal (Drive: 6 plays, 65 yards, 2:09; Tied 3–3)
- (1:21) BGSU – Malcolm Johnson Jr. 50-yard pass from Connor Bazelak, Zach Long kick (Drive: 5 plays, 75 yards, 1:54; BGSU 10–3)

Second quarter

- (11:14) BGSU – Zach Long 25-yard field goal (Drive: 8 plays, 60 yards, 3:39; BGSU 13–3)
- (2:46) KSU – Will Hryszko 30-yard field goal (Drive: 9 plays, 51 yards, 3:56; BGSU 13–6)
- (0:23) BGSU – Lucian Anderson III 2-yard run, Zach Long kick (Drive: 10 plays, 73 yards, 2:16; BGSU 20–6)

Third quarter

No scoring plays

Fourth quarter

- (6:32) BGSU – Jamal Johnson 7-yard pass from Connor Bazelak, Zach Long kick (Drive: 9 plays, 63 yards, 5:36; BGSU 27–6)

Statistics	KENT	BGSU
First downs	11	25
Plays–yards	54–204	74–444
Rushes–yards	25–126	47–131
Passing yards	78	313
Passing: comp–att–int	7–29–3	23–27–0
Turnovers	3	0
Time of possession	22:31	37:29

Team	Category	Player	Statistics
Kent State	Passing	Tommy Ulatowski	7/27, 78 yards, 2 INT
Kent State	Rushing	Ky Thomas	14 carries, 121 yards
Kent State	Receiving	Luke Floriea	2 receptions, 35 yards
Bowling Green	Passing	Connor Bazelak	23/27, 313 yards, 2 TD
Bowling Green	Rushing	Terion Stewart	25 carries, 134 yards
Bowling Green	Receiving	Harold Fannin Jr.	10 receptions, 171 yards

Kent State came into the game with the longest active FBS losing streak of 15 games. They also had not led in a game at any point of the season. After four games, the Golden Flashes named Tommy Ulatowski starting quarterback. Through two games as a starter, he threw for 739 yards and seven touchdowns. Reigning MAC Offensive Player of the Week wide receiver Chrishon McCray had 13 receptions for 401 yards and five touchdowns during that two game span. Bowling Green came into the game with a 61–24–6 record, winning the previous matchup 49–19.

After punts by both teams to start the game, the Falcons went on a nine play 84 yard drive that resulted in a Zach Long 32 yard field goal. Running back Ky Thomas ran for 60 of his season high 121 yards on the first two plays of the Golden Flashes following drive. Kent State kicker Will Hryszko tied the game with a 37-yard kick. Bowling Green quarterback Connor Bazelak then found wide receiver Malcolm Johnson Jr. on a 50-yard touchdown pass its next drive. Following a Kent State punt, Long would connect on his second field goal of the game from 25 yards out. After both teams traded punts, the Golden Flashes had a nine play 51 yard drive that ended with Hryszko's second field goal. With under a minute remaining in the half, Falcons backup quarterback Lucian Anderson III scored on a designed run for his second score of the season. Bowling Green led at the half 20–6.

An uneventful second half was highlighted by three Falcons fourth quarter interceptions. The Orange and Brown capped off the scoring with Bazelak connecting with Jamal Johnson on a 7-yard score out of the backfield with just under seven minutes remaining in the game. McCray was held to just three receptions for 21 yards. Bowling Green's defensive captain Jordan Oladokun limited McCray to only two catches for five yards while guarding him. Gold Flashes quarterback Ulatowski managed just seven completions on 27 attempts. Falcons' Bazelak threw for a season high 313 yards and was 23-of-27 passing. His completion percentage of 85.2 set a single game program record for a quarterback with 20 plus attempts. Bowling Green's Harold Fannin Jr. racked up 171 receiving yards on 10 receptions, putting him as the programs receiving yards leader by a tight end. He passed his position coach and former Falcon, Alex Bayer.

=== At Toledo (rivalry) ===
Bowling Green Falcons (3–4) at Toledo Rockets (5–2) – Game summary

Quarter	1	2	3	4	Total
Falcons	14	14	3	10	41
Rockets	7	13	6	0	26

at Glass Bowl • Toledo, Ohio

- Date: October 26, 2024
- Game time: 3:30 p.m.
- Game weather: Sunny • Temperature: 58 °F (14 °C) • Wind: NW at 9 miles per hour (14 km/h)
- Game attendance: 29,697
- Referee: Matt Packowski
- TV announcers (ESPN+): Michael Reghi (play-by-play) and Je'Rod Cherry (analyst)

Game information

First quarter

- (11:06) BGSU – Terion Stewart 5-yard run, Zach Long kick (Drive: 5 plays, 45 yards, 2:42; BGSU 7–0)
- (6:57) TOL – Jerjuan Newton 4-yard pass from Tucker Gleason, Dylan Cunanan kick (Drive: 9 plays, 75 yards, 4:11; Tied 7–7)
- (2:40) BGSU – Harold Fannin Jr. 9-yard pass from Connor Bazelak, Zach Long kick (Drive: 5 plays, 54 yards, 1:58; BGSU 14–7)

Second quarter

- (14:06) TOL – Dylan Cunanan 54-yard field goal (Drive: 10 plays, 39 yards, 3:34; BGSU 14–10)
- (8:55) BGSU – Levi Gazarek 2-yard pass from Connor Bazelak, Zach Long kick (Drive: 9 plays, 79 yards, 5:05; BGSU 21–10)
- (2:58) TOL – Tucker Gleason 12-yard run (Drive: 14 plays, 75 yards, 5:57; BGSU 21–17)
- (1:02) BGSU – Jordan Oladokun 61-yard interception return, Zach Long kick (BGSU 28–17)
- (0:00) TOL – Dylan Cunanan 27-yard field goal (Drive: 6 plays, 41 yards, :53; BGSU 28–20)

Third quarter

- (8:42) TOL – Jerjuan Newton 64-yard pass from Tucker Gleason, Two-point pass failed (Drive: 5 plays, 93 yards, 2:03; BGSU 28–26)
- (5:33) BGSU – Zach Long 47-yard field goal (Drive: 8 plays, 44 yards, 3:03; BGSU 31–26)

Fourth quarter

- (14:58) BGSU – Zach Long 35-yard field goal (Drive: 7 plays, 64 yards, 2:44; BGSU 34–26)
- (5:11) BGSU – Rahkeem Smith 19-yard run, Zach Long kick (Drive: 5 plays, 60 yards, 3:23; BGSU 41–26)

Statistics	BGSU	TOL
First downs	23	23
Plays–yards	65–402	73–422
Rushes–yards	37–215	28–102
Passing yards	187	320
Passing: comp–att–int	18–28–0	30–45–2
Turnovers	0	2
Time of possession	32:29	27:31

Team	Category	Player	Statistics
Bowling Green	Passing	Connor Bazelak	17/27, 171 yards, 2 TD
Bowling Green	Rushing	Terion Stewart	21 carries, 99 yards, TD
Bowling Green	Receiving	Harold Fannin Jr.	6 receptions, 74 yards, TD
Toledo	Passing	Tucker Gleason	30/45, 320 yards, 2 TD, 2 INT
Toledo	Rushing	Connor Walendzak	15 carries, 58 yards
Toledo	Receiving	Jerjuan Newton	9 receptions, 164 yards, 2 TD

Bowling Green won the coin toss and elected to defer. After a three and out by Toledo, running back Terion Stewart scored on a 5-yard run that capped off a five play 45 yard drive. The Rockets responded with a nine play 75 yard drive of its own. Quarterback Tucker Gleason found wide receiver Jerjuan Newton on a 4-yard touchdown pass to even the score. After both teams traded punts, quarterback Connor Bazelak connected with tight end Harold Fannin Jr. on a nine yard shovel pass that gave the Falcons a 14–7 lead. The Rockets then settled for a Dylan Cunanan career long 54-yard field goal on its next drive. On Bowling Green's ensuing drive, Bazelak found senior tight end Levi Gazarek on a 2-yard score. This was Gazarek's first career touchdown. He also was a member on the baseball team that had won the MAC regular season in the spring. This was the third touchdown in the Falcon's first four possessions. Gleason then took the Rockets on a 14 play 75 yard drive where he scored on a 12-yard keeper. Following a Bowling Green punt, Gleason's pass was intercepted in Falcons territory by defensive back Jordan Oladokun who then returned it 61 yards for a touchdown. Toledo salvaged another Cunanan field goal as the clock expired, making the score 28–20 at the break.

After Bowling Green's first drive stalled, Gleason found Newton on a 64-yard touchdown for his second score of the game. This was Newton's 31st career receiving touchdown, which set a program record. Gleason's two-point conversion pass sailed incomplete and the Falcons kept a two point lead. Falcons' kicker Zach Long made two field goals the following two drives, including a career long of 47 yards. Leading 34–26 in the fourth quarter, Gleason was intercepted again by Oladokun. The Orange and Brown capitalized on the second turnover of the game when Rahkeem Smith scored on a 19-yard jet sweep. The Bowling Green victory narrowed Toledo's all-time series lead to just one game after 89 meetings.

Bazelak surpassed 11,000 yards for his career and became the 86th player in FBS history to do so. Stewart surpassed 2,000 career rushing yards and became the 14th player in program history to achieve this. For Oladokun's performance, he was named Pro Football Focus national and conference team of the week.

=== At Central Michigan ===
Bowling Green Falcons (4–4) at Central Michigan Chippewas (3–5) – Game summary

Quarter	1	2	3	4	Total
Falcons	3	6	7	7	23
Chippewas	0	7	0	6	13

at Kelly/Shorts Stadium • Mount Pleasant, Michigan

- Date: November 5, 2024
- Game time: 7:30 p.m.
- Game weather: Rain • Temperature: 67 °F (19 °C) • Wind: N at 9 miles per hour (14 km/h)
- Game attendance: 7,832
- Referee: Rich Edwards
- TV announcers (ESPN2): Clay Matvick (play-by-play) and Steve Addazio (analyst)

Game information

First quarter

- (9:05) BGSU – Zach Long 32-yard field goal (Drive: 12 plays, 64 yards, 5:49; BGSU 3–0)

Second quarter

- (12:55) BGSU – Zach Long 40-yard field goal (Drive: 9 plays, 59 yards, 5:17; BGSU 6–0)
- (2:28) BGSU – Zach Long 37-yard field goal (Drive: 5 plays, 35 yards, 1:40; BGSU 9–0)
- (0:31) CMU – Tyler Jefferson 1-yard run, Tristan Mattson kick (Drive: 6 plays, 75 yards, 1:57; BGSU 9–7)

Third quarter

- (12:17) BGSU – Levi Gazarek 9-yard pass from Connor Bazelak, Zach Long kick (Drive: 6 plays, 39 yards, 2:27; BGSU 16–7)

Fourth quarter

- (5:42) BGSU – Jaison Patterson 1-yard run, Zach Long kick (Drive: 8 plays, 33 yards, 5:26; BGSU 23–7)
- (1:50) CMU – Jadyn Glasser 1-yard run, Two-point run failed (Drive: 11 plays, 75 yards, 3:52; BGSU 23–13)

Statistics	BGSU	CMU
First downs	19	13
Plays–yards	65–388	52–250
Rushes–yards	35–181	38–187
Passing yards	207	63
Passing: comp–att–int	19–30–0	6–14–0
Turnovers	0	1
Time of possession	35:53	24:07

Team	Category	Player	Statistics
Bowling Green	Passing	Connor Bazelak	19/30, 207 yards, TD
Bowling Green	Rushing	Terion Stewart	20 carries, 117 yards
Bowling Green	Receiving	Harold Fannin Jr.	7 receptions, 86 yards
Central Michigan	Passing	Jadyn Glasser	5/7, 57 yards
Central Michigan	Rushing	Marion Lukes	20 carries, 72 yards
Central Michigan	Receiving	Chris Parker	3 receptions, 25 yards

Bowling Green built a 9–0 lead from three first half Zach Long field goals. Central Michigan punted its first four possessions of the game. With under two minutes remaining in the half, Chippewas freshman quarterback Tyler Jefferson broke free on a 44-yard run inside the Falcons 30 yard line. Four plays later, Jefferson scored from 1-yard out on a keeper. The Falcons lead at the break 9–7.

On the first play of the second half, Jefferson was sacked by Anthony Hawkins who caused a fumble. Bowling Green's Joseph Sipp Jr. recovered the fumble in Central Michigan territory. Six plays later, Connor Bazelak found tight end Levi Gazarek on a 9-yard touchdown pass. It was Gazarek's second score in as many games. Following a Chippewas punt, the Falcons drove inside its opponents 20 yard line, but Long's field 27-yard field goal attempt was blocked. Leading 16–7, Central Michigan elected to attempt a 4th and four from the Bowling Green's thirty yard line. Running back Marion Lukes was stopped just a yard short, turning the ball over on downs. After both teams traded punts, the Falcons would put the game away on a Jaison Patterson 1-yard touchdown run with under six minutes remaining. Jefferson was replaced in the fourth quarter after completing just one pass in seven attempts. True freshman Jadyn Glasser led the Chippewas on a 75-yard touchdown drive that he capped off on a 1-yard score with under two minutes remaining. Trailing by ten, the Chippewas two point conversion attempt was unsuccessful. Bowling Green was then able to run out the remainder of the clock, advancing to a four way tie for first place in league play.

Bowling Green tight end Harold Fannin Jr. surpassed 1,000 receiving yards on the season. He became the first Falcon since Scotty Miller in 2018 to accomplish this feat. His seven receptions broke the Bowling Green single-season record for receptions by a tight end, previously held by Mark Dowdell. Bazelak finished the game with 207 passing yards, surpassing 2,000 for the season. He became the third player in FBS history to pass for over 2,000 yards four seasons.

=== vs Western Michigan ===
Game Ten – Western Michigan Broncos (5–4) at Bowling Green Falcons (5–4) – Game summary

Quarter	1	2	3	4	Total
Broncos	0	7	6	0	13
Falcons	3	14	14	0	31

at Doyt Perry Stadium • Bowling Green, Ohio

- Date: November 12, 2024
- Game time: 7:00 p.m.
- Game weather: Clear • Temperature: 37 °F (3 °C) • Wind: NE 7 miles per hour (11 km/h)
- Game attendance: 8,461
- Referee: David Siegle
- TV announcers (ESPN2): Clay Matvick (play-by-play) and Steve Addazio (analyst)

Game information

First quarter

- (8:32) BGSU – Zach Long 50-yard field goal (Drive: 12 plays, 37 yards, 4:35; Bowling Green 3-0)

Second quarter

- (10:36) WMU – Jalen Buckley 6-yard run (Luka Zurak kick) (Drive: 13 plays, 87 yards, 8:02; Western Michigan 7-3)
- (5:12) BGSU – Harold Fannin Jr. 25-yard pass from Connor Bazelak (Zach Long kick) (Drive: 6 plays, 84 yards, 3:11; Bowling Green 10-7)
- (4:02) BGSU – Connor Bazelak 1-yard run (Zach Long kick) (Drive: 3 plays, 26 yards, 0:57; Bowling Green 17-7)

Third quarter

- (11:11) BGSU – Terion Stewart 17-yard run (Zach Long kick) (Drive: 7 plays, 65 yards, 3:49; Bowling Green 24-7)
- (6:38) BGSU – Harold Fannin Jr. 10-yard pass from Connor Bazelak (Drive: 3 plays, 74 yards, 1:25; Bowling Green 31-7)
- (0:27) WMU – Jalen Buckley 5-yard run (pass failed) (Drive: 12 plays, 63 yards, 6:03; Bowling Green 31-13)

Fourth quarter

- no scoring plays

Statistics	WMU	BGSU
First downs	19	19
Plays–yards	69–292	56–402
Rushes–yards	36–97	33–226
Passing yards	195	176
Passing: comp–att–int	24–33–2	15–23–0
Turnovers	2	1
Time of possession	33:23	26:37

Team	Category	Player	Statistics
Western Michigan	Passing	Hayden Wolff	24/32, 195 yards, 2 INT
Western Michigan	Rushing	Jalen Buckley	15 carries, 73 yards, 2 TD
Western Michigan	Receiving	Kenneth Womack	4 receptions, 62 yards
Bowling Green	Passing	Connor Bazelak	15/22, 176 yards, 2 TD
Bowling Green	Rushing	Terion Stewart	15 carries, 150 yards, TD
Bowling Green	Receiving	Harold Fannin Jr.	10 receptions, 137 yards, 2 TD

Bowling Green lost the coin toss and forced a Western Michigan three and out to begin the game. The Falcons then settled for a Zach Long career long 50-yard field goal. After both teams punted, the Broncos went on a 13 play 87 yard drive that ended with a 6-yard touchdown run by Jalen Buckley. The Falcons fumbled the returning kickoff that was recovered by the Broncos in Bowling Green territory. However three consecutive negative yardage plays that featured two sacks pushed Western Michigan out of field goal range. Following a punt, quarterback Connor Bazelak engineered an 84 yard drive that resulted with a Harold Fannin Jr. 25-yard touchdown catch. On the first play off the Broncos' next drive, quarterback Hayden Wolff's pass was intercepted by Jacorey Benjamin. On the second play of the ensuing drive, running back Terion Stewart ran 23 yards to the Western Michigan one yard line. Originally scored a touchdown, but was reversed by replay review. Bazelak scored on a sneak the very next play. Leading 17–7, the Broncos went on a ten play 41-yard drive that resulted with no points because of a Luka Zurak 50-yard field goal that sailed just short.

On the Falcons first drive of the second half, Stewart scored on a 17-yard touchdown run to increase the lead to 24–7. Following another Broncos punt, the Falcons scored again in just three plays. Stewart had runs of four and sixty, while Bazelak found Fannin Jr. for a 10-yard touchdown. The Broncos responded with a twelve play 63 yard drive that resulted in a Buckley 5-yard touchdown run. The two point conversion attempt failed, leaving the deficit at a three score game. A scoreless fourth quarter was highlighted with a Todd Bumphis interception in the end zone in the game's final minute.

With the victory, the Falcons became bowl eligible for the third consecutive season under head coach Scot Loeffler. Fannin Jr. became the programs all-time leader in receptions by a tight end with 146. Stewart ran for 150 yards, which was the tenth 100-yard game in his career. Stewart moved into tenth place all-time in the programs history with 2,293 rushing yards.

=== At Ball State ===
Bowling Green Falcons (6–4) at Ball State Cardinals (3–7) – Game summary

Quarter	1	2	3	4	Total
Falcons	7	3	18	10	38
Cardinals	0	7	0	6	13

at Scheumann Stadium • Muncie, Indiana

- Date: November 23, 2024
- Game time: 2:00 p.m.
- Game weather: Cloudy • Temperature: 40 °F (4 °C) • Wind: W at 13 miles per hour (21 km/h)
- Game attendance: 7,116
- Referee: Greg Sujack
- TV announcers (ESPN+): Michael Reghi (play-by-play) and Je'Rod Cherry (analyst)

Game information

First quarter

- (4:46) BGSU – Harold Fannin Jr. 4-yard pass from Connor Bazelak (Zach Long kick) (Drive: 15 plays, 93 yards, 8:44; Bowling Green 7-0)

Second quarter

- (1:36) BGSU – Zach Long 43-yard field goal (Drive: 9 plays, 32 yards, 3:08; Bowling Green 10-0)
- (0:34) BALL – Vaughn Pemberton 51-yard pass from Kadin Semonza (Jackson Courville kick) (Drive: 6 plays, 69 yards, :54; Bowling Green 10-7)

Third quarter

- (7:58) BGSU – Zach Long 36-yard field goal (Drive: 14 plays, 51 yards, 6:55; Bowling Green 13-7)
- (4:01) BGSU – Rahkeem Smith 1-yard run (Two-point pass to Jamal Johnson) (Drive: 5 plays, 46 yards, 2:13; Bowling Green 21-7)
- (2:16) BGSU – Rahkeem Smith 66-yard pass from Connor Bazelak (Zach Long kick) (Drive: 2 plays, 70 yards, :48; Bowling Green 28-7)

Fourth quarter

- (12:25) BGSU – Zach Long 48-yard field goal (Drive: 7 plays, 16 yards, 2:24; Bowling Green 31-7)
- (8:30) BALL – Qian Magwood 13-yard pass from Kadin Semonza (Two-point pass failed) (Drive: 9 plays, 73 yards, 3:50; Bowling Green 31-13)
- (1:55) BGSU – Rahkeem Smith 4-yard pass from Lucian Anderson III (Zach Long kick) (Drive: 7 plays, 26 yards, 3:23; Bowling Green 38-13)

Statistics	BGSU	BALL
First downs	17	15
Plays–yards	71–362	62–254
Rushes–yards	41–103	24–43
Passing yards	259	211
Passing: comp–att–int	19–30–0	19–38–1
Turnovers	1	1
Time of possession	34:57	25:03

Team	Category	Player	Statistics
Bowling Green	Passing	Connor Bazelak	18/29, 255 yards, 2 TD
Bowling Green	Rushing	Terion Stewart	10 carries, 32 yards
Bowling Green	Receiving	Harold Fannin Jr.	9 receptions, 125 yards, TD
Ball State	Passing	Kadin Semonza	19/37, 211 yards, 2 TD
Ball State	Rushing	Vaughn Pemberton	5 carries, 29 yards
Ball State	Receiving	Vaughn Pemberton	3 receptions, 70 yards, TD

Ball State fired head coach Mike Neu after its last game and he was replaced by interim head coach Colin Johnson. The game had two of the most productive tight ends in the country. The matchup featured Bowling Green's Harold Fannin Jr. and Ball State's Tanner Koziol. Both players entered the game third and fourth in country for receptions, respectively. Following a Cardinals punt, the Falcons went methodically down the field on a 15 play 93 yard drive that took nearly nine minutes off of the clock. Fannin Jr. scored on a 4-yard touchdown pass from quarterback Connor Bazelak. After five total scoreless possessions in the game, running back Terion Stewart fumbled the ball that was recovered by Ball State in Bowling Green territory. On the first play of Ball State's next drive, a reverse run that was thrown for a trick play was intercepted by Jordan Oladokun who returned it 33 yards. The turnover resulted in a successful Zach Long 43-yard field goal. Leading 10–0, the Cardinals responded with a six play 69 yard touchdown drive that resulted in a Kadin Semonza 51-yard touchdown pass to running back Vaughn Pemberton on third and ten with just 34 seconds remaining in the half.

On the Falcons first drive of the second half, Zach Long would connect on his second field goal of the game from 36 yards out. Bowling Green's defense forced a three and out. Rahkeem Smith would score on the following possession on a 1-yard touchdown run. The Cardinals were forced to punt again after gaining just three yards on its next possession. Bazelak then found Smith, who broke a tackle and went 66 yards for his second touchdown of the game. Early in the fourth quarter, Long would make his third field goal of the game from 48 yards away. Ball State scored on its next drive, with Semonza finding Qian Magwood on a 13-yard touchdown reception. With the two point conversion attempt unsuccessful and the Falcons up three scores they would turn to backup quarterback Lucian Anderson III. On Anderson's second drive of the game, he would find Smith on a 4-yard touchdown reception for his third score of the game. For Smith's performance he was named MAC Offensive Player of the Week.

The victory marked five consecutive wins for the Falcons. Fannin Jr. ended the game with 125 receiving yards, bringing his season total to 1,295 yards, which led the country through week 13. Entering week 14, Fannin Jr. is 58 receiving yards away from breaking Jace Amaro's record of 1,352 receiving yards by a tight end that was set in 2013 when he was at Texas Tech. Quarterback Connor Bazelak moved into 21st place with 1,093 career completions in FBS history. Wide receiver Rahkeem Smith had a career-high 81 receiving yards to go along with his three total touchdowns. Cornerback Jordan Oladokun recorded his third interception of the season and seventh of his Bowling Green career.

=== vs Miami (OH) ===
Miami RedHawks (7–4) vs Bowling Green Falcons (7–4) – Game summary

Quarter	1	2	3	4	Total
RedHawks	7	7	0	14	28
Falcons	0	5	0	7	12

at Doyt Perry Stadium • Bowling Green, Ohio

- Date: November 29, 2024
- Game time: 12:00 p.m.
- Game weather: Cloudy • Temperature: 16 °F (−9 °C) • Wind: W at 20 miles per hour (32 km/h)
- Game attendance: 9,345
- Referee: Jeremy Valentine
- TV announcers (ESPNU): Noah Reed (play-by-play) and Craig Haubert (analyst)

Game information

First quarter

- (6:44) M-OH – Cade McDonald 30-yard pass from Brett Gabbert (Dom Dzioban kick) (Drive: 1 play, 30 yards, :05; Miami Ohio 7-0)

Second quarter

- (12:14) BGSU – Patrick Day safety (Miami Ohio 7-2)
- (7:47) BGSU – Zach Long 41-yard field goal (Drive: 10 plays, 49 yards, 4:26; Miami Ohio 7-5)
- (2:40) M-OH – Reginald Virgil 20-yard pass from Brett Gabbert (Dom Dzioban kick) (Drive: 8 plays, 82 yards, 5:01; Miami Ohio 14-5)

Third quarter

No scoring plays

Fourth quarter

- (11:35) BGSU – Jaison Patterson 2-yard run (Zach Long kick) (Drive: 11 plays, 92 yards, 5:30; Miami Ohio 14-12)
- (10:35) M-OH – Javon Tracy 72-yard pass from Brett Gabbert (Dom Dzioban kick) (Drive: 2 plays, 72 yards, :54; Miami Ohio 21-12)
- (1:52) M-OH – Keyon Mozee 27-yard run (Dom Dzioban kick) (Drive: 2 plays, 29 yards, :36; Miami Ohio 28-12)

Statistics	M-OH	BGSU
First downs	16	16
Plays–yards	55–372	66–261
Rushes–yards	27–117	24–51
Passing yards	255	210
Passing: comp–att–int	18–28–2	27–42–1
Turnovers	2	1
Time of possession	30:07	29:53

Team	Category	Player	Statistics
Miami (OH)	Passing	Brett Gabbert	18/28, 255 yards, 3 TD, 2 INT
Miami (OH)	Rushing	Keyon Mozee	18 carries, 108 yards, TD
Miami (OH)	Receiving	Javon Tracy	3 receptions, 91 yards, TD
Bowling Green	Passing	Connor Bazelak	26/41, 201 yards, INT
Bowling Green	Rushing	Jamal Johnson	3 carries, 36 yards
Bowling Green	Receiving	Malcolm Johnson Jr.	8 receptions, 75 yards

=== vs Arkansas State (68 Ventures Bowl) ===
2024 68 Ventures Bowl
Arkansas State Red Wolves (7–5) at Bowling Green Falcons (7–5) – Game summary

Quarter	1	2	3	4	Total
Red Wolves	17	7	7	7	38
Falcons	7	14	3	7	31

at Hancock Whitney Stadium • Mobile, Alabama

- Date: Thursday, December 26, 2024
- Game time: 8:00 p.m.
- Game weather: Overcast • Temperature: 59 °F (15 °C) • Wind: E at 9 miles per hour (14 km/h)
- Game attendance: 19,582
- Referee: Garrett Dickerson
- TV announcers (ESPN): Clay Matvick (play-by-play), Roddy Jones (analyst), and Ashley Stroehlein (sideline)

Game information

First Quarter

- (9:57) ARST – Clune Van Andel 46 yard field goal (Drive: 13 plays, 46 yards, 5:03; Arkansas State 3–0)
- (8:02) ARST – Courtney Jackson 60 yard punt return, Clune Van Andel kick (Drive: 3 plays, -2 yards, 1:51; Arkansas State 10–0)
- (4:04) BGSU – Malcolm Johnson Jr. 43 yard pass from Baron May, Zach Long kick (Drive: 7 plays, 75 yards, 3:58; Arkansas State 10–7)
- (1:39) ARST – Jaylen Raynor 5 yard run, Clune Van Andel kick (Drive: 8 plays, 75 yards, 2:25; Arkansas State 17–7)

Second Quarter

- (6:46) BGSU – Jaison Patterson 8 yard pass from Connor Bazelak, Zach Long kick (Drive: 8 plays, 77 yards, 4:22; Arkansas State 17–14)
- (4:13) ARST – Corey Rucker 79 yard pass from Jaylen Raynor, Clune Van Andel kick (Drive: 5 plays, 93 yards, 2:30; Arkansas State 24–14)
- (1:36) BGSU – Harold Fannin Jr. 4 yard pass from Connor Bazelak, Zach Long kick (Drive: 7 plays, 75 yards, 2:37; Arkansas State 24–21)

Third Quarter

- (11:21) ARST – Corey Rucker 6 yard pass from Jaylen Raynor, Clune Van Andel kick (Drive: 6 plays, 34 yards, 3:19; Arkansas State 31–21)
- (6:14) BGSU – Zach Long 38 yard field goal (Drive: 13 plays, 55 yards, 5:07; Arkansas State 31–24)

Fourth Quarter

- (3:10) ARST – Zak Wallace 14 yard run, Clune Van Andel kick (Drive: 8 plays, 68 yards, 4:43; Arkansas State 38–24)
- (1:42) BGSU – Rahkeem Smith 23 yard pass from Connor Bazelak, Zach Long kick (Drive: 5 plays, 38 yards, 1:17; Arkansas State 38–31)

Statistics	ARST	BGSU
First downs	20	22
Plays–yards	63–360	74–479
Rushes–yards	32–128	24–46
Passing yards	232	433
Passing: Comp–Att–Int	19–31–1	33–50–0
Time of possession	27:25	32:35

Team	Category	Player	Statistics
Arkansas State	Passing	Jaylen Raynor	18/30, 221 yards, 2 TD, INT
Arkansas State	Rushing	Zak Wallace	15 carries, 99 yards, TD
Arkansas State	Receiving	Corey Rucker	4 receptions, 107 yards, 2 TD
Bowling Green	Passing	Connor Bazelak	32/49, 390 yards, 3 TD
Bowling Green	Rushing	Jaison Patterson	5 carries, 15 yards
Bowling Green	Receiving	Harold Fannin Jr.	17 receptions, 213 yards, TD

== Statistics ==
As of December 27, 2024

=== Individual leaders ===
Legend
Led the FBS
Led the MAC

==== Passing ====
Passing statistics (Note: Pegues threw one incompletion.)
Name	GP	GS	Record	Cmp	Att	Pct	Yds	Avg	TD	Int	Rtg
Connor Bazelak	13	13	7–6	269	402	66.9	3,044	7.6	18	5	142.8
Baron May	1	0	—	1	1	100.0	43	43.0	1	0	791.2
Lucian Anderson III	8	0	—	5	12	41.7	32	2.7	1	1	74.9
Harold Fannin Jr.	13	13	—	1	2	50.0	9	4.5	0	0	87.8
Totals	13	13	7–6	276	419	66.0	3,128	7.5	20	6	141.8

==== Rushing & receiving ====
Rushing & receiving statistics
Name	GP	GS	Att	Yds	Avg	Lng	TD	Rec	Yds	Avg	Lng	TD
Terion Stewart	11	5	166	898	5.4	73T	6	1	12	12.0	12	0
Jaison Patterson	13	5	99	426	4.3	41	5	12	105	8.8	18	1
Connor Bazelak	13	13	48	−91	−1.9	19	2					
Jamal Johnson	13	7	26	188	7.2	41T	1	31	231	7.5	36	1
Rahkeem Smith	13	4	20	128	6.4	40T	3	25	349	14.0	66T	3
Lucian Anderson III	8	0	19	67	3.5	19	2					
Justin Pegues	13	0	13	51	3.9	14	0	11	44	4.0	7	0
Harold Fannin Jr.	13	12	9	65	7.2	31T	1	117	1,555	13.3	65T	10
John Henderson	13	0	4	50	12.5	29	0					
Mar'Kel Porter	2	0	4	11	2.8	8	0					
Chris Edmonds	2	0	2	8	4.0	5	0					
Malcolm Johnson Jr.	13	11	1	−4	−4.0	−4	0	49	569	11.6	50T	3
Finn Hogan	12	6						17	176	10.4	33	0
Levi Gazarek	13	9						8	62	7.8	17	2
Jacob Harris	9	0						2	5	2.5	3	0
Jared Merk	13	0						1	15	15.0	15	0
Trey Johnson	11	1						1	7	7.0	7	0
Elijah Boyd	12	1						1	3	3.0	3	0
Totals	13	13	411	1,778	4.3	73	20	276	3,133	11.4	66	20

==== Defense ====
Only top five are listed.

Defense statistics
Name	GP	Solo	Ast	Comb	TFL	Sk	Int	Yds	Avg	TD	PD	FR	Yds	TD	FF
Joseph Sipp Jr.	11	38	34	72	11	6.0	0	0	0.0	0	2	1	0	0	0
Brock Horne	11	26	43	69	5	1.5	0	0	0.0	0	0	0	0	0	2
CJ Brown	11	34	26	60	3	0.0	0	0	0.0	0	1	0	0	0	0
Charles Rosser	11	25	29	54	8	5.5	0	0	0.0	0	0	0	0	0	2
Anthony Hawkins	11	13	27	40	7	5.0	0	0	0.0	0	3	0	0	0	1
Totals	11	338	376	714	67	29	9	102	11.3	1	30	2	0	0	8

==== Special teams ====
Kicking statistics
Name	GP	FGM	FGA	Pct	0–19	20–29	30–39	40–49	50+	Lng	XPM	XPA	Pct	Pts
Zach Long	11	11	14	78.6	0–0	1–2	5–6	4–5	1–1	50	17	17	100.0	50
Jackson Kleather	6	6	9	66.7	0–0	1–2	3–3	2–3	0–1	45	17	18	94.4	35
Totals	11	17	23	73.9	0–0	2–4	8–9	6–8	1–2	50	34	35	97.1	85

Kickoff statistics
Name	GP	Num	Yds	Avg	Lng	TB	OB
Zach Long	11	62	3,842	62.0	70	36	2
Totals	11	62	3,842	62.0	70	36	2

Punting statistics
Name	GP	Punts	Yds	Avg	Lng	TB	I–20	50+	FC	Blk
John Henderson	11	40	1,693	42.3	66	1	19	6	18	0
Totals	11	40	1,693	42.3	66	1	19	6	18	0

==== Returns ====
Kick & punt return statistics
Name	Ret	Yds	Avg	Lng	FC	TD	Ret	Yds	Avg	Lng	FC	TD
Justin Pegues	9	263	29.2	100T	1	1	18	88	4.9	24	13	0
Rahkeem Smith	9	213	23.7	32	1	0	2	0	0.0	0	2	0
Jaison Patterson	2	41	20.5	22	0	0						
Andrew Booker	1	7	7.0	7	0	0						
Patrick Day	1	4	4.0	4	0	0						
Ian Drummond	0	0	0.0	0	2	0						
Trey Johnson							1	19	19.0	19	0	0
Totals	22	528	24.0	100	4	1	21	107	5.1	24	15	0

== Awards and honors ==
=== Weekly awards ===
Award	Player	Position	Year	Week	Source
MAC Special Teams Player of the Week	Justin Pegues	KR/PR	Jr	Week 1	
MAC Offensive Player of the Week	Harold Fannin Jr.	TE	Jr	Week 4	
MAC Offensive Player of the Week	Harold Fannin Jr. (2)	TE	Jr	Week 5	
MAC Offensive Player of the Week	Harold Fannin Jr. (3)	TE	Jr	Week 6	
MAC Offensive Player of the Week	Rahkeem Smith	WR	Jr	Week 13	

=== MAC Conference individual yearly awards ===
Award	Player	Position	Year	Date	Source
MAC Offensive Player of the Year	Harold Fannin Jr.	TE	Jr.	Dec. 5	
Vern Smith Leadership Award Winner	Harold Fannin Jr.	TE	Jr.	Dec. 5	

=== All-MAC awards ===
Award	Player	Position	Year	Source
All-MAC First Team Offense	Harold Fannin Jr.	TE	Jr.	
All-MAC First Team Offense	Terion Stewart	RB	Jr.	
All-MAC First Team Offense	Alex Wollschlaeger	OL	Sr.	
All-MAC First Team Defense	Joseph Sipp Jr.	LB	Jr.	
All-MAC First Team Defense	Jordan Oladokun	DB	Sr.	
All-MAC Second Team Defense	John Henderson	P	Jr.	
All-MAC Third Team Offense	Connor Bazelak	QB	Sr.	
All-MAC Third Team Defense	Anthony Hawkins	DL	Sr.	
All-MAC Third Team Defense	Jacorey Benjamin	DB	Sr.	
