= Jordan Oladokun =

American football player (born 2002)

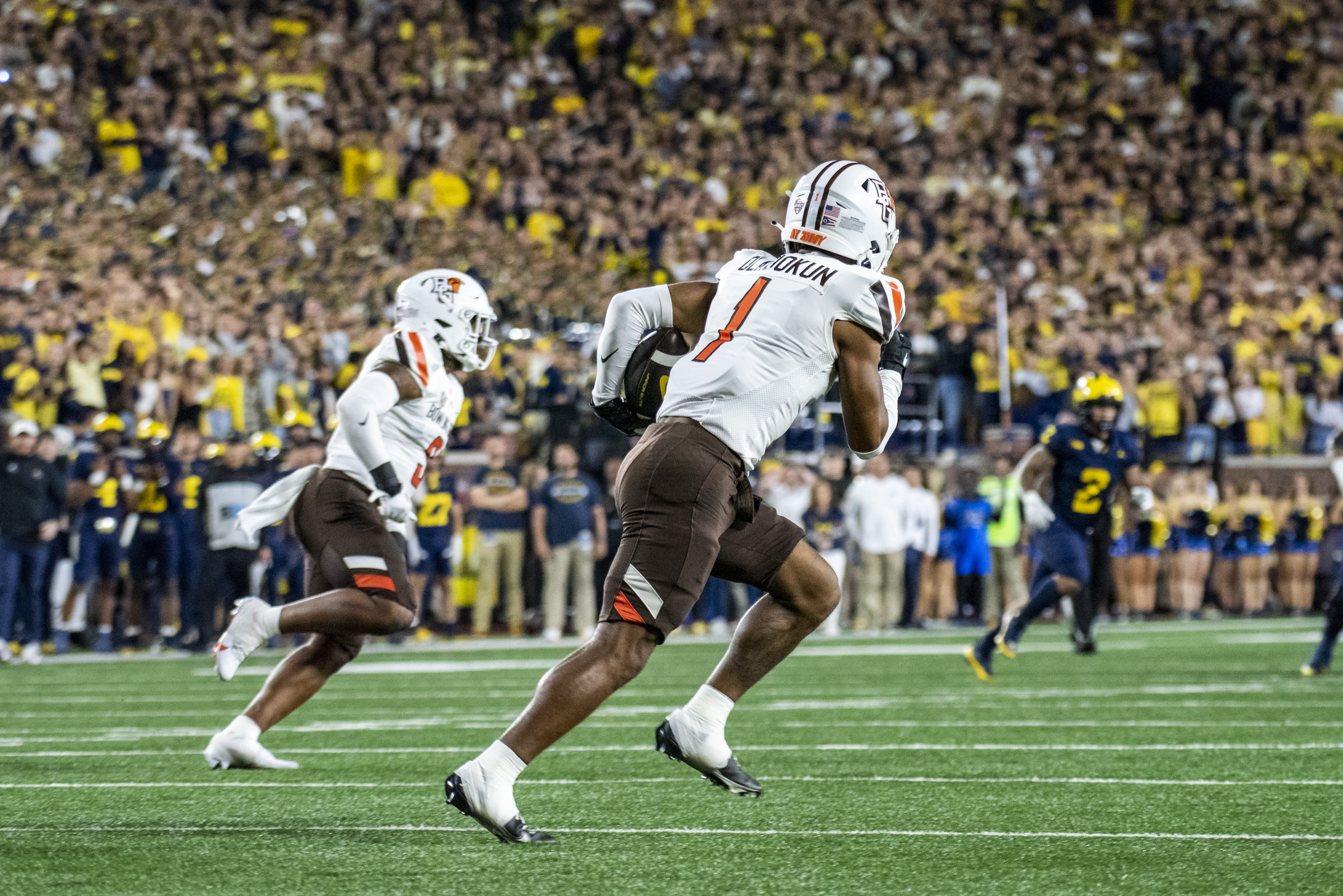
- Oladokun in 2023

Profile
- Position: Cornerback

Personal information
- Born: July 29, 2002 (age 24); Tampa, Florida, U.S.
- Listed height: 6 ft 0 in (1.83 m)
- Listed weight: 190 lb (86 kg)

Career information
- High school: Gaither (Hillsborough County, Florida)
- College: Samford (2021); Bowling Green (2022–2024)
- NFL draft: 2025: undrafted

Career history
- Los Angeles Chargers (2025)*; BC Lions (2026)
- * Offseason or practice squad member only

Awards and highlights
- First-team All-MAC (2024); Second-team All-MAC (2023)
- Stats at Pro Football Reference

Jordan Oladokun (born July 22, 2002) is an American professional football cornerback. He played college football for the Samford Bulldogs and Bowling Green Falcons.

== Early life ==
Oladokun was born and grew up in Tampa, Florida. He was rated as a three-star prospect and also played basketball and baseball at Gaither High School. In football he was a four-time All-State honoree.

== College career ==
=== Samford ===
On February 2, 2021, Oladokun signed with the Samford Bulldogs. His brother Chris Oladokun played with the Bulldogs in the previous 2020 season. Oladokun appeared in six games before missing the rest of the season with an injury.

=== Bowling Green ===
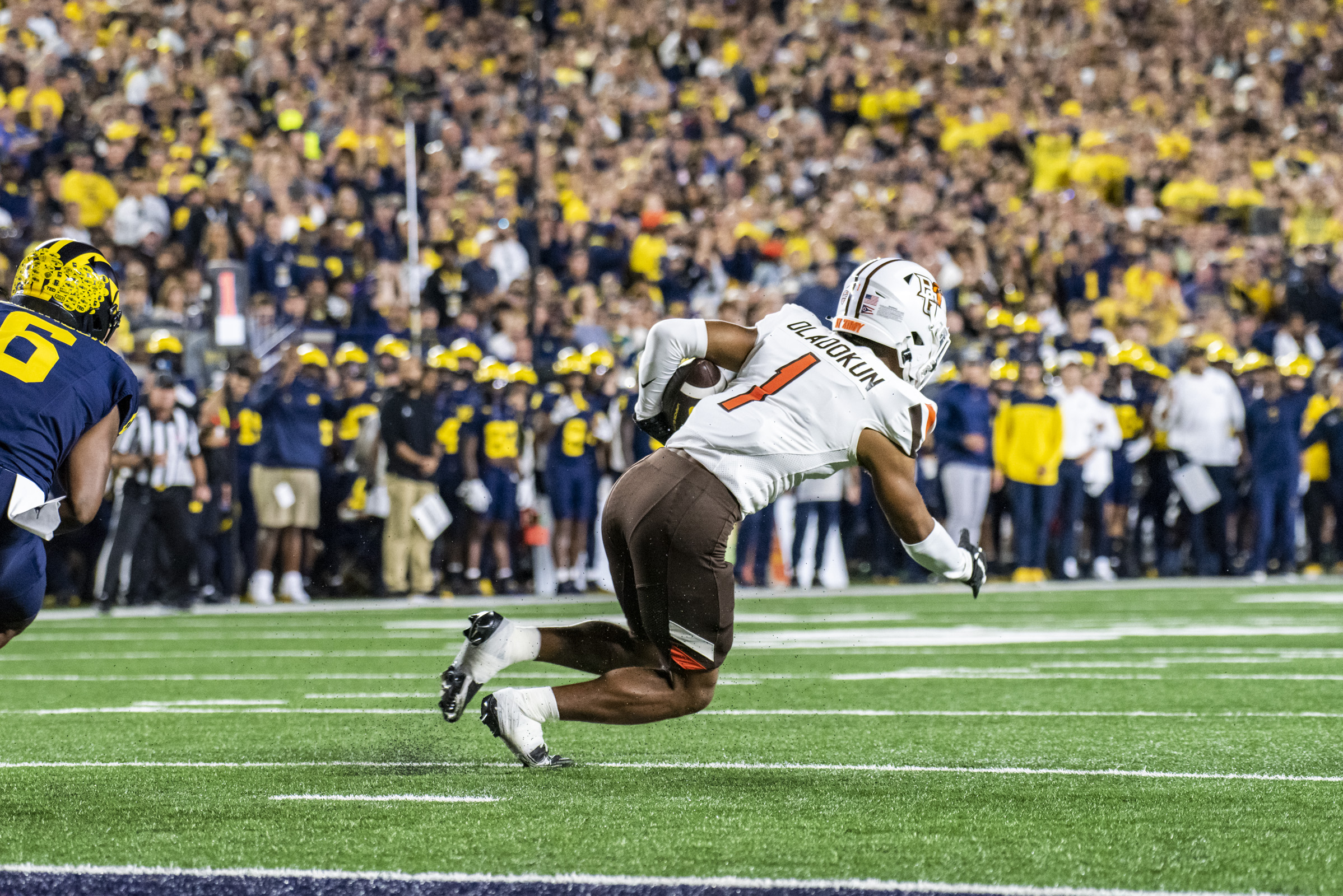
Oladokun with the Bowling Green Falcons in 2023. He is returning his first collegiate interception from Michigan quarterback J. J. McCarthy.

In his first season with Bowling Green, Oladokun appeared in all 13 games and made six starts. In 2023, he appeared in 11 of 13 games, missing two games due to an injury. He recorded his first career interception off of Michigan quarterback J. J. McCarthy. In the season finale against Western Michigan, Oladokun intercepted quarterback Hayden Wolff's pass and returned it 53 yards for a touchdown. On the season Oladokun was named second-team All-MAC.

In 2024, Oladokun was named one of Bowling Green's team captains. Against future CFP semifinalist Penn State he recorded four tackles and a broken up pass in a near upset. Against rival Toledo he recorded a career high two interceptions. This also included a game changing 61-yard interception return for a touchdown just before halftime. In his final game as a Falcon, Oladokun recorded an interception against Arkansas State football in the 2024 68 Ventures Bowl. On the season he was named first-team All-MAC and College Football News third-team All-America.

=== Statistics ===
Year	Team	Games		Tackles				Fumbles				Interceptions			
Year	Team	GP	GS	Cmb	Solo	Ast	Sck	FF	FR	Yds	TD	Int	Yds	TD	PD
2021	Samford	6	1	7	5	2	0.0	0	0	0	0	0	0	0	2
2022	Bowling Green	13	6	18	14	4	0.0	0	1	20	0	0	0	0	8
2023	Bowling Green	11	11	30	21	9	0.0	0	0	0	0	4	82	1	6
2024	Bowling Green	13	13	35	27	8	0.0	0	0	0	0	5	136	1	8
Career		44	31	90	67	23	0.0	0	1	20	0	9	218	2	24

== Professional career ==
Pre-draft measurables
Height	Weight	Arm length	Hand span	40-yard dash	10-yard split	20-yard split	20-yard shuttle	Three-cone drill	Vertical jump	Broad jump	Bench press
6 ft 0 in (1.83 m)	192 lb (87 kg)	30 in (0.76 m)	8 7/8 in (0.23 m)	4.50 s	1.64 s	2.70 s	4.32 s	7.02 s	31.0 in (0.79 m)	9 ft 2 in (2.79 m)	15 reps
All values from Pro Day

=== Los Angeles Chargers ===
On May 9, 2025, Oladokun was signed with the Los Angeles Chargers as an undrafted free agent. He was waived/injured on August 13, and reverted to the team's injured reserve list on August 15.

On May 7, 2026, Oladokun was waived by the Chargers.

=== BC Lions ===
On September 21, 2026, Oladokun signed with the BC Lions of the Canadian Football League (CFL), and joined their practice roster along with his older brother, quarterback Chris Oladokun. On October 17, Oladokun was promoted to the Lions' active roster and made his CFL debut the same day, in a loss against the Calgary Stampeders. This game was also his first as his brother's teammate, in a professional league. On October 22, Oladokun was reassigned to the Lions' practice roster. On November 8, Oladokun became a free agent as his contract expired at the conclusion of the Lions' season.

== Personal life ==
Oladokun is the younger brother of current CFL quarterback, Chris Oladokun.
