= 1939 Slippery Rock Rockets football team =

American college football season

1939 Slippery Rock Rockets football

PSTC champion
- Conference: Pennsylvania State Teachers Conference
- Record: 8–0 (5–0 PSTC)
- Head coach: N. Kerr Thompson (20th season)

1939 Pennsylvania State Teachers Conference football standings
	Conf.					Overall
Team	W		L		T	W		L		T
Slippery Rock $	5	–	0	–	0	8	–	0	–	0
West Chester	3	–	0	–	0	3	–	3	–	3
Clarion	2	–	0	–	1	5	–	1	–	1
Lock Haven	5	–	1	–	0	5	–	4	–	0
Indiana (PA)	4	–	2	–	2	4	–	2	–	2
Mansfield	3	–	2	–	0	4	–	3	–	0
East Stroudsburg	3	–	2	–	0	3	–	5	–	0
Shippensburg	3	–	3	–	1	3	–	3	–	1
Kutztown	2	–	3	–	0	5	–	3	–	0
California (PA)	1	–	3	–	0	1	–	7	–	0
Millersville	1	–	4	–	0	2	–	5	–	0
Edinboro	0	–	5	–	0	1	–	6	–	0
Bloomsburg	0	–	7	–	0	0	–	8	–	0
$ – Conference champion

The 1936 Slippery Rock Rockets football team was an American football team that represented Slippery Rock State Normal School (now known as Slippery Rock University of Pennsylvania) as a member of the Pennsylvania State Teachers Conference (PSTC) during the 1939 college football season. In their 20th season under head coach N. Kerr Thompson, the Rockets compiled an 8–0 record (5–0 against PSTC opponents), won the PSTC championship, and outscored opponents by a total of 202 to 20.

Slippery Rock had agreed to play in the "Brain Bowl" against Maryville, but Maryville pulled out of the game when seven of its players left for National Guard training.

== Schedule ==
Date	Opponent	Site	Result	Attendance	Source
September 30	at Shippensburg	Shippensburg, PA	W 16–0		
October 7	vs. Millersville	Thompson Field; Butler, PA	W 38–0		
October 14	Westminster*	Slippery Rock, PA	W 14–13		
October 21	at Indiana (PA)	Indiana, PA	W 13–0		
October 28	at Grove City*	Grove City, PA	W 13–0		
November 4	at Thiel*	Greenville, PA	W 14–7		
November 11	Edinboro	Slippery Rock, PA	W 40–0		
November 18	California (PA)	Slippery Rock, PA	W 54–0		
*Non-conference game
