= N. Kerr Thompson =

American sports coach (1888–1968)

Biographical details
- Born: November 18, 1888; Butler County, Pennsylvania, U.S.
- Died: September 20, 1968 (aged 79); Grove City, Pennsylvania, U.S.
- Education: Slippery Rock (1908)

Playing career

Football
- 1912: Ursinus

Coaching career (HC unless noted)

Football
- 1916–1917: Ursinus
- 1920–1945: Slippery Rock

Basketball
- 1916–1918: Ursinus
- 1919–1926: Slippery Rock
- 1930–1947: Slippery Rock

Baseball
- 1948–1955: Slippery Rock

Head coaching record
- Overall: 133–64–15 (football); 269–144 (basketball)

Accomplishments and honors

Championships
- Football; 1 PSTCC (1939)

Nelson Kerr Thompson (November 18, 1888 – September 20, 1968) was an American football, basketball and baseball coach. He served as the head football coach at Ursinus College from 1916 to 1917 and Slippery Rock State Teachers College—now known as Slippery Rock University of Pennsylvania—from 1920 to 1945, compiling a career college football coaching record of 133–64–5. Thompson was the head basketball coach at Ursinus from 1916 to 1918 and Slippery Rock from 1919 to 1926 and from 1930 to 1946, tallying a career college basketball mark of 269–144.

Thompson was born on November 18, 1888, in Butler County, Pennsylvania, to Nelson and Jessie Kerr Thompson. He graduated from Ursinus in 1912 and later earned a degree from the University of Pittsburgh. Thompson died on September 20, 1968, at Bashline Memorial Hospital in Grove City, Pennsylvania.

== Head coaching record ==
=== Football ===
Year	Team	Overall	Conference	Standing	Bowl/playoffs
Ursinus (Independent) (1916–1917)
1916	Ursinus	4–3–2			
1917	Ursinus	3–3–2			
Ursinus:		7–6–4			
Slippery Rock (Independent) (1920–1933)
1920	Slippery Rock	6–1			
1921	Slippery Rock	5–3			
1922	Slippery Rock	3–3			
1923	Slippery Rock	9–1			
1924	Slippery Rock	9–0			
1925	Slippery Rock	4–3–2			
1926	Slippery Rock	7–1–1			
1927	Slippery Rock	8–1			
1928	Slippery Rock	7–2			
1929	Slippery Rock	6–2			
1930	Slippery Rock	5–3–1			
1931	Slippery Rock	4–5			
1932	Slippery Rock	3–5–1			
1933	Slippery Rock	7–0–1			
Slippery Rock Rockets (Pennsylvania State Teachers Conference / Pennsylvania State Teachers College Conference) (1934–1935)
1934	Slippery Rock	2–4–1	1–2	T–8th	
1935	Slippery Rock	5–4	2–1	5th	
1936	Slippery Rock	6–3	3–1	4th	
1937	Slippery Rock	3–6	0–3	T–10th	
1938	Slippery Rock	6–2–1	3–0–1	2nd	
1939	Slippery Rock	8–0	5–0	1st	
1940	Slippery Rock	4–3–1	1–1–1	T–6th	
1941	Slippery Rock	2–4–1	1–3	10th	
1942	Slippery Rock	4–2	2–2	T–4th	
1943	No team—World War II				
1944	No team—World War II				
1945	Slippery Rock	3–0–1			
Slippery Rock:		126–58–11	20–14–2		
Total:		133–64–15			
National championship Conference title Conference division title or championship game berth
