= Chris Oladokun =

American gridiron football player (born 1997)

- Oladokun with the BC Lions in 2026

No. 14 – BC Lions
- Position: Quarterback
- Roster status: Active
- CFL status: American

Personal information
- Born: September 3, 1997 (age 29); Tampa, Florida, U.S.
- Listed height: 6 ft 1 in (1.85 m)
- Listed weight: 213 lb (97 kg)

Career information
- High school: Sickles (Citrus Park, Florida), Alonso High School Tampa Florida
- College: South Florida (2016–2018); Samford (2019–2020); South Dakota State (2021)
- NFL draft: 2022: 7th round, 241st overall pick

Career history
- Pittsburgh Steelers (2022)*; Kansas City Chiefs (2022–2025); BC Lions (2026–present)
- * Offseason or practice squad member only

Awards and highlights
- 2× Super Bowl champion (LVII, LVIII)

Career NFL statistics
- Passing attempts: 55
- Passing completions: 35
- Completion percentage: 63.6%
- TD–INT: 1–0
- Passing yards: 235
- Passer rating: 79.0
- Rushing yards: 23
- Stats at Pro Football Reference

Chris Oladokun [] (born September 3, 1997) is an American professional football quarterback for the BC Lions of the Canadian Football League (CFL). He played college football for the South Florida Bulls, Samford Bulldogs, and South Dakota State Jackrabbits before being selected by the Pittsburgh Steelers in the seventh round of the 2022 NFL draft.

== Early life ==
Oladokun was born and grew up in Tampa, Florida. He initially attended Braulio Alonso High School, where he was the starting quarterback as a sophomore and junior and passed for 3,746 yards and 35 touchdowns over those two seasons. Oladokun transferred to Sickles High School prior to his senior season, because of a disagreement with the head coach. He was rated a three-star recruit and committed to play college football at the University of South Florida.

== College career ==
Oladokun began his college career with South Florida, and redshirted his true freshman season. He played two games during his redshirt freshman season, completing one pass attempt for 12 yards and rushing once for one yard. Oladokun started three games as a redshirt sophomore and completed 22 of 44 pass attempts for 285 yards with three touchdowns and one interception. After the season, Oladokun transferred to Samford.

Oladokun played all 12 of the Bulldogs' games and started eight in his first season with the team. He passed for 2,064 yards and 18 touchdowns with seven interceptions and rushed for 493 yards and eight touchdowns. After his senior season, Oladokun transferred to South Dakota State as a graduate transfer. In his lone season with the Jackrabbits, he passed for 3,164 yards and 25 touchdowns, leading them to an 11-4 record and a spot in the FCS semifinals.

=== Statistics ===
Season	Team	Games			Passing								Rushing			
Season	Team	GP	GS	Record	Cmp	Att	Pct	Yds	Y/A	TD	Int	Rtg	Att	Yds	Avg	TD
2016	South Florida	0	0	—	Redshirted (redshirt)											
2017	South Florida	2	0	—	1	1	100.0	12	12.0	0	0	200.8	1	1	1.0	0
2018	South Florida	6	3	0–3	22	44	50.0	285	6.5	3	1	122.4	25	19	0.8	0
2019	Samford	12	8	5–3	169	272	62.1	2,058	7.6	18	7	142.6	127	491	3.9	8
2020–21	Samford	7	1	0–1	37	56	66.1	221	3.9	1	2	98.0	22	26	1.2	2
2021	South Dakota State	15	15	11–4	238	382	62.3	3,164	8.3	25	7	149.0	73	166	2.3	2
Career		42	27	16–11	467	755	61.9	5,740	7.6	47	17	141.8	248	703	2.8	12

== Professional career ==
Pre-draft measurables
Height	Weight	Arm length	Hand span	Wingspan	40-yard dash	10-yard split	20-yard split	Vertical jump	Broad jump
6 ft 2 in (1.88 m)	218 lb (99 kg)	31 7/8 in (0.81 m)	9 1/4 in (0.23 m)	6 ft 4 in (1.93 m)	4.70 s	1.65 s	2.68 s	32.5 in (0.83 m)	9 ft 3 in (2.82 m)
All values from Pro Day

=== Pittsburgh Steelers ===
Oladokun was selected in the seventh round with the 241st overall pick of the 2022 NFL draft by the Pittsburgh Steelers. He was released on August 23, 2022.

=== Kansas City Chiefs ===
On August 31, 2022, Oladokun was signed to the practice squad of the Kansas City Chiefs. Oladokun earned a Super Bowl ring when the Chiefs defeated the Philadelphia Eagles in Super Bowl LVII. On February 15, 2023, Oladokun signed a reserve/future contract with the Chiefs.

Oladokun was waived by the Chiefs as part of final roster cuts on August 31, 2023. He was signed to the practice squad the following day. He was elevated via a standard elevation before the Chiefs week 18 game against the Los Angeles Chargers. It was the first game of his career he was active for, but he did not play. He reverted to the practice squad after the game. Oladokun earned his second Super Bowl ring when the Chiefs defeated the San Francisco 49ers in Super Bowl LVIII.

Oladokun was waived by the Chiefs on August 27, 2024. He was re-signed to the practice squad on October 22, 2024. Oladokun was a game day elevation for Kansas City in their season finale against the Denver Broncos. He made his NFL debut in the game, logging five offensive snaps, including one rush for five yards. He was the first NFL Quarterback of direct African descent to play an NFL game . Oladokun signed a reserve/future contract with the Chiefs on February 11, 2025.

On August 26, 2025, Oladokun was waived by the Chiefs as part of final roster cuts and re-signed to the practice squad the next day. He was promoted to the active roster on December 20 after Patrick Mahomes was injured for the rest of the season. On December 21, Oladokun came in to play against the Tennessee Titans, after starter Gardner Minshew was injured, who himself was replacing the injured Patrick Mahomes. He completed his first career pass to Travis Kelce, a six-yard catch over the middle in the second quarter. Oladokun started his first career NFL game on December 25, against the Denver Broncos. He went 13-for-22 with one touchdown pass and no interceptions as the Chiefs lost 20–13.

On August 30, 2026, Oladokun was waived/injured by the Chiefs.

=== BC Lions ===
On September 21, 2026, Oladokun signed with the BC Lions of the Canadian Football League (CFL), and joined their practice roster along with his younger brother, defensive back Jordan Oladokun. On September 24, Oladokun was promoted to the Lions' active roster and made his CFL debut two days later, in a win over the Toronto Argonauts. On October 17, Jordan Oladokun was promoted to the Lions' active roster and made his CFL debut the same day in a loss against the Calgary Stampeders, in his first game with Chris as his teammate in a professional league.

== NFL career statistics ==
Legend
Won the Super Bowl

Year	Team	Games			Passing									Rushing					Sacks		Fumbles	
Year	Team	GP	GS	Record	Cmp	Att	Pct	Yds	Y/A	Lng	TD	Int	Rtg	Att	Yds	Avg	Lng	TD	Sck	Yds	Fum	Lost
2023	KC	0	0	—	DNP																	
2024	KC	1	0	—	0	0	0.0	0	—	0	0	0	0.0	1	5	5.0	5	0	1	5	1	0
2025	KC	3	2	0–2	35	55	63.6	235	4.3	31	1	0	79.0	5	18	3.6	7	0	8	93	4	2
Career		4	2	0–2	35	55	63.6	235	4.3	31	1	0	79.0	6	23	3.8	7	0	9	98	5	2

== Personal life ==
Chris Oladokun is the older brother of current BC Lions cornerback Jordan Oladokun, who plays in the Canadian Football League (CFL).
