= Don Ault =

American football coach

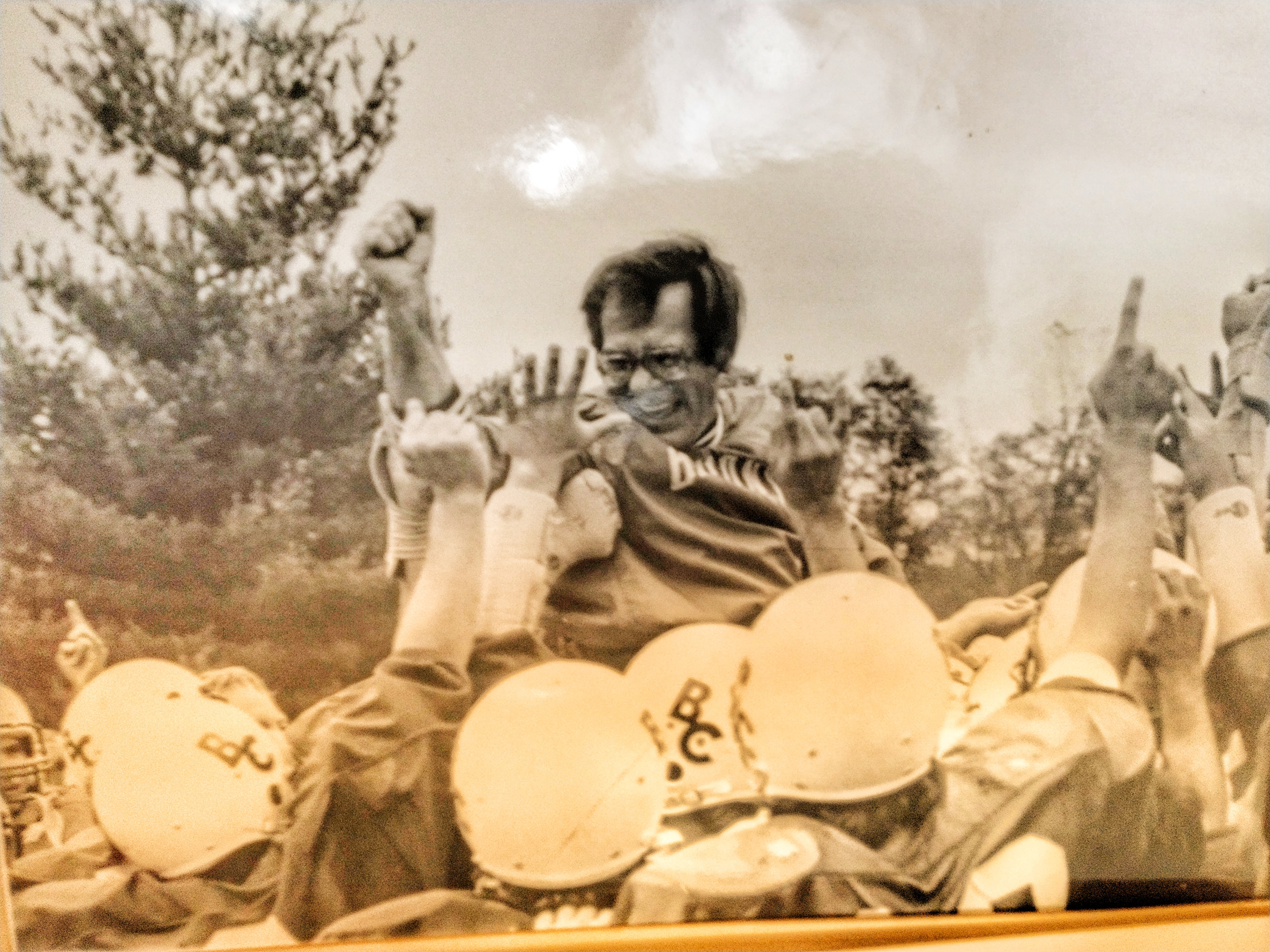

Biographical details
- Born: July 17, 1929; Bellaire, Ohio, U.S.
- Died: February 25, 2021 (aged 91)
- Education: West Liberty (1951)

Playing career
- 1949–1950: West Liberty

Coaching career (HC unless noted)
- 1966: Bellaire HS (OH)
- 1967: Marshall (assistant)
- 1973–1981: Bethany (WV)
- 1982–1986: Slippery Rock

Head coaching record
- Overall: 70–58–2 (college)
- Tournaments: 0–1 (NCAA D-III playoffs)

Accomplishments and honors

Championships
- 2 PAC (1975, 1980)

E. Donald Ault (July 17, 1929 – February 25, 2021) was an American football coach. He served as the head football coach at Bethany College in Bethany, West Virginia from 1973 to 1981 and Slippery Rock University of Pennsylvania from 1982 to 1986, compiling a career college football coaching record of 70–58–2.

The football field at Bethany College was named in Ault's honor in 2021. Ault died on February 25, 2021.

== Head coaching record ==
=== College ===
Year	Team	Overall	Conference	Standing	Bowl/playoffs
Bethany Bison (Presidents' Athletic Conference) (1973–1981)
1973	Bethany	3–5–1	2–5	T–6th	
1974	Bethany	5–3–1	4–3	3rd	
1975	Bethany	5–4	5–1	1st	
1976	Bethany	4–5	4–3	4th	
1977	Bethany	2–7	2–5	7th	
1978	Bethany	2–6	2–5	7th	
1979	Bethany	6–2	5–2	T–2nd	
1980	Bethany	9–1	7–0	1st	L NCAA Division III Quarterfinal
1981	Bethany	7–2	5–2	T–2nd	
Bethany:		43–35–2	36–26		
Slippery Rock Rockets (Pennsylvania State Athletic Conference) (1982–1986)
1982	Slippery Rock	7–3	4–2	T–2nd (West)	
1983	Slippery Rock	6–4	3–3	5th (West)	
1984	Slippery Rock	6–4	3–3	5th (West)	
1985	Slippery Rock	5–5	2–4	5th (West)	
1986	Slippery Rock	3–7	3–3	T–3rd (West)	
Slippery Rock:		27–23	15–15		
Total:		70–58–2			
National championship Conference title Conference division title or championship game berth
