= George Mihalik =

American football player and coach (born 1952)

Biographical details
- Born: May 22, 1952 (age 74)

Playing career
- 1971–1973: Slippery Rock
- Position: Quarterback

Coaching career (HC unless noted)
- 1976: Kentucky (GA)
- 1977–1987: Slippery Rock (assistant)
- 1988–2015: Slippery Rock

Head coaching record
- Overall: 197–111–4
- Tournaments: 7–6 (NCAA D-II playoffs)

Accomplishments and honors

Championships
- 2 PSAC (2014–2015); 8 PSAC West Division (1997–2000, 2011, 2013–2015)

George Mihalik (born May 22, 1952) is an American football coach and former player. He served as the head football coach at Slippery Rock University of Pennsylvania from 1988 to 2015, compiling a record of 197–111–4. Mihalik retired following the 2015 season, in which he led The Rock to its best record in school history at 12–2, an NCAA Quarterfinals appearance, a second consecutive Pennsylvania State Athletic Conference (PSAC) championship, and a third consecutive PSAC West Division title.

Mihalik was a three-year letterman at Slippery Rock, playing quarterback from 1971 to 1973. He served as a graduate assistant at the University of Kentucky for one season in 1976 and then was an assistant coach at Slippery Rock for 11 seasons before being promoted to head coach. George Mihalik was a brother of Alpha Sigma Phi while attending Slippery Rock University in the 1970s.

== Head coaching record ==
Year	Team	Overall	Conference	Standing	Bowl/playoffs
Slippery Rock Rockets / Slippery Rock (Pennsylvania State Athletic Conference) (1988–2015)
1988	Slippery Rock	5–3–2	2–2–2	4th (West)	
1989	Slippery Rock	4–5–1	2–3–1	4th (West)	
1990	Slippery Rock	4–6–1	4–2	3rd (West)	
1991	Slippery Rock	6–4	4–2	T–2nd (West)	
1992	Slippery Rock	8–3	5–1	2nd (West)	
1993	Slippery Rock	6–4	3–3	T–3rd (West)	
1994	Slippery Rock	6–4	4–2	T–2nd (West)	
1995	Slippery Rock	7–4	4–2	3rd (West)	
1996	Slippery Rock	7–4	4–2	T–3rd (West)	
1997	Slippery Rock	11–2	6–0	1st (West)	L NCAA Division II Quarterfinal
1998	Slippery Rock	12–2	6–0	1st (West)	L NCAA Division II Semifinal
1999	Slippery Rock	10–2	6–0	1st (West)	L NCAA Division II First Round
2000	Slippery Rock	8–3	5–1	T–1st (West)	
2001	Slippery Rock	6–4	3–3	T–3rd (West)	
2002	Slippery Rock	7–4	4–2	T–2nd (West)	
2003	Slippery Rock	4–7	2–4	T–4th (West)	
2004	Slippery Rock	4–7	2–4	T–4th (West)	
2005	Slippery Rock	5–5	4–2	T–3rd (West)	
2006	Slippery Rock	7–4	4–2	3rd (West)	
2007	Slippery Rock	9–2	4–2	3rd (West)	
2008	Slippery Rock	5–6	3–4	5th (West)	
2009	Slippery Rock	6–5	3–4	T–4th (West)	
2010	Slippery Rock	6–5	3–4	T–4th (West)	
2011	Slippery Rock	8–3	6–1	T–1st (West)	
2012	Slippery Rock	6–5	5–2	T–3rd (West)	
2013	Slippery Rock	9–3	6–1	1st (West)	L NCAA Division II First Round
2014	Slippery Rock	9–3	7–2	T–1st (West)	L NCAA Division II First Round
2015	Slippery Rock	12–2	6–1	T–1st (West)	L NCAA Division II Quarterfinal
Slippery Rock:		197–111–4	117–58–3		
Total:		197–111–4			
National championship Conference title Conference division title or championship game berth
