= 2024 68 Ventures Bowl =

Postseason college football bowl game

- 26th 68 Ventures Bowl
Arkansas State Red Wolves	Bowling Green Falcons
(7–5)	(7–5)
Sun Belt	MAC
38	31
Head coach: Butch Jones	Head coach: Scot Loeffler
	1	2	3	4	Total
Arkansas State	17	7	7	7	38
Bowling Green	7	14	3	7	31
- Date: December 26, 2024
- Season: 2024
- Stadium: Hancock Whitney Stadium
- Location: Mobile, Alabama
- MVP: Harold Fannin Jr. (TE, Bowling Green)
- Favorite: Bowling Green by 10.5
- Referee: Garrett Dickerson (CUSA)
- Attendance: 19,582

United States TV coverage
- Network: ESPN
- Announcers: Clay Matvick (play-by-play), Roddy Jones (analyst), and Ashley Stroehlein (sideline)

The 2024 68 Ventures Bowl was a college football bowl game played on December 26, 2024, at Hancock Whitney Stadium in Mobile, Alabama. The 26th annual 68 Ventures Bowl (though only the second game under that name) featured Arkansas State and Bowling Green. The game begin at approximately 8:00 p.m. CST and aired on ESPN. The 68 Ventures Bowl was one of the 2024–25 bowl games concluding the 2024 FBS football season.

== Teams ==
Consistent with conference tie-ins, the game featured teams from the Mid-American Conference (MAC) and the Sun Belt Conference. The two teams featured in this matchup have the most (Arkansas State) and second-most (Bowling Green) appearances in this bowl game's history, though they had never appeared together in the bowl (and had only one prior meeting between them, a 1950 win by Bowling Green).

=== Arkansas State Red Wolves ===
Arkansas State played to a 7–5 record (5–3 in Sun Belt play) during the regular season. The Red Wolves faced two ranked FBS teams, losing to Michigan and Iowa State.

=== Bowling Green Falcons ===
Bowling Green compiled a regular-season record of 7–5 (6–2 in MAC play). The Falcons lost to both of the ranked teams they played, Penn State and Texas A&M.

== Game summary ==
2024 68 Ventures Bowl

Quarter	1	2	3	4	Total
Arkansas State	17	7	7	7	38
Bowling Green	7	14	3	7	31

at Hancock Whitney Stadium • Mobile, Alabama

- Date: Thursday, December 26, 2024
- Game time: 8:11 p.m. CST
- Game weather: Cloudy • Temperature: 60 °F (16 °C) • Wind: 5 mph (8.0 km/h) east
- Game attendance: 19,582
- Referee: Garrett Dickerson
- TV announcers (ESPN): Clay Matvick (play-by-play), Roddy Jones (analyst), and Ashley Stroehlein (sideline)
- Box score

Game information

First Quarter

- (9:57) ARST – Clune Van Andel 46 yard field goal (Drive: 13 plays, 46 yards, 5:03; Arkansas State 3–0)
- (8:02) ARST – Courtney Jackson 60 yard punt return, Clune Van Andel kick (Drive: 3 plays, -2 yards, 1:51; Arkansas State 10–0)
- (4:04) BGSU – Malcolm Johnson Jr. 43 yard pass from Baron May, Zach Long kick (Drive: 7 plays, 75 yards, 3:58; Arkansas State 10–7)
- (1:39) ARST – Jaylen Raynor 5 yard run, Clune Van Andel kick (Drive: 8 plays, 75 yards, 2:25; Arkansas State 17–7)

Second Quarter

- (6:46) BGSU – Jaison Patterson 8 yard pass from Connor Bazelak, Zach Long kick (Drive: 8 plays, 77 yards, 4:22; Arkansas State 17–14)
- (4:13) ARST – Corey Rucker 79 yard pass from Jaylen Raynor, Clune Van Andel kick (Drive: 5 plays, 93 yards, 2:30; Arkansas State 24–14)
- (1:36) BGSU – Harold Fannin Jr. 4 yard pass from Connor Bazelak, Zach Long kick (Drive: 7 plays, 75 yards, 2:37; Arkansas State 24–21)

Third Quarter

- (11:21) ARST – Corey Rucker 6 yard pass from Jaylen Raynor, Clune Van Andel kick (Drive: 6 plays, 34 yards, 3:19; Arkansas State 31–21)
- (6:14) BGSU – Zach Long 38 yard field goal (Drive: 13 plays, 55 yards, 5:07; Arkansas State 31–24)

Fourth Quarter

- (3:10) ARST – Zak Wallace 14 yard run, Clune Van Andel kick (Drive: 8 plays, 68 yards, 4:43; Arkansas State 38–24)
- (1:42) BGSU – Rahkeem Smith 23 yard pass from Connor Bazelak, Zach Long kick (Drive: 5 plays, 38 yards, 1:17; Arkansas State 38–31)

=== Statistics ===
Statistics	ASU	BGSU
First downs	20	22
Plays–yards	360	479
Rushes–yards	128	46
Passing yards	232	433
Passing: comp–att–int	19–31–1	33–50–0
Time of possession	27:25	32:35

Team	Category	Player	Statistics
Arkansas State	Passing	Jaylen Raynor	18/30, 221 yards, 2 TD, INT
Arkansas State	Rushing	Zak Wallace	15 carries, 99 yards, TD
Arkansas State	Receiving	Corey Rucker	4 receptions, 107 yards, 2 TD
Bowling Green	Passing	Connor Bazelak	32/49, 390 yards, 3 TD
Bowling Green	Rushing	Jaison Patterson	5 carries, 15 yards
Bowling Green	Receiving	Harold Fannin Jr.	17 receptions, 213 yards, TD
