= Harold Fannin Jr. =

American football player (born 2004)

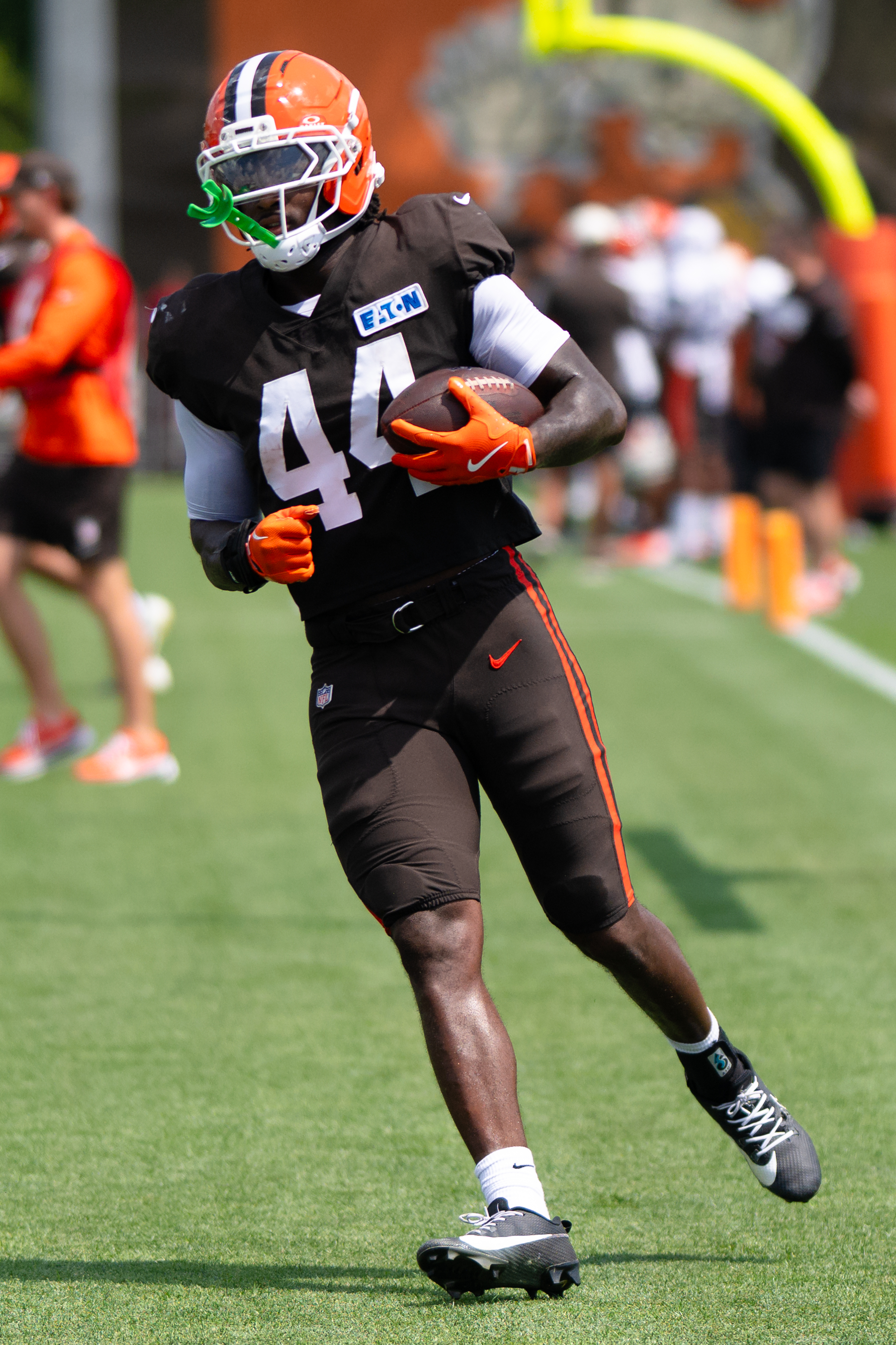
- Fannin Jr. with the Cleveland Browns in 2026

No. 44 – Cleveland Browns
- Position: Tight end
- Roster status: Active

Personal information
- Born: July 20, 2004 (age 22); Canton, Ohio, U.S.
- Listed height: 6 ft 4 in (1.93 m)
- Listed weight: 241 lb (109 kg)

Career information
- High school: McKinley (Canton)
- College: Bowling Green (2022–2024)
- NFL draft: 2025: 3rd round, 67th overall pick

Career history
- Cleveland Browns (2025–present)

Awards and highlights
- Consensus All-American (2024); NCAA receptions leader (2024); NCAA receiving yards leader (2024); MAC Most Valuable Player (2024); MAC Offensive Player of the Year (2024); 2× First-team All-MAC (2023, 2024); 2024 68 Ventures Bowl (MVP)

Career NFL statistics as of Week 9, 2026
- Rushing yards: 13
- Rushing average: 1.9
- Rushing touchdowns: 1
- Receptions: 109
- Receiving yards: 1,184
- Receiving touchdowns: 10
- Stats at Pro Football Reference

Harold Fannin Jr. (born July 20, 2004) is an American professional football tight end for the Cleveland Browns of the National Football League (NFL). He played college football for the Bowling Green Falcons and was selected by the Browns in the third round of the 2025 NFL Draft.

== Early life and high school career ==
Fannin was born and raised in Canton, Ohio and attended McKinley High School. He was named first-team All-Ohio as a senior at defensive back after making 106 tackles with two interceptions, six forced fumbles, four fumble recoveries, and two defensive touchdowns and was also an All-Federal League selection on offense after catching 36 passes for 601 yards and six touchdowns. Fannin committed to play college football at Bowling Green State University.

== College career ==
=== Freshman season – 2022 ===
Harold Fannin Jr. began his collegiate career with the Bowling Green Falcons in 2022, appearing in 11 games as a freshman. He recorded 19 receptions for 218 yards and one touchdown.

=== Sophomore season – 2023 ===
In 2023, Fannin emerged as one of the top offensive threats for Bowling Green. He finished the season with 44 receptions for 623 yards and six touchdowns, earning first-team All-Mid-American Conference (MAC) honors.

=== Junior season – 2024 ===
Fannin entered the 2024 season on the preseason John Mackey Award Watch List, signaling expectations for him as one of the top tight ends in college football. He set several FBS records throughout the year. Against Penn State, Fannin recorded 11 receptions for 137 yards and a touchdown, becoming the only player during the regular season to post 100+ receiving yards against the Nittany Lions' defense. He amassed 145 yards on eight catches with a touchdown against Texas A&M, earning John Mackey and MAC Offensive Player of the Week honors. Against Old Dominion, Fannin set a school record for single-game receiving yards by a tight end with 193 yards on 12 receptions, breaking a record set in 1983. He also surpassed Bowling Green's career touchdown record for tight ends in this game. Against Kent State, he surpassed Alex Bayer's career receiving yards mark for tight ends at Bowling Green, finishing the game with 171 yards on ten catches.

Fannin finished the season with eight 100-yard receiving games, leading the nation in receptions and receiving yards. His performance earned him first-team All-MAC honors for the second consecutive year, and he became a finalist for the John Mackey Award after leading all FBS tight ends in receptions, receiving yards, and touchdowns.

=== Records, awards, and achievements ===
Fannin finished his junior season with 1,555 receiving yards and 117 receptions, setting new records for FBS tight ends. Fannin also set the FBS tight end single-season standard in receiving yards per game (119.6) and single-season receptions per game (9.0). Fannin also became the first tight end in FBS history to lead the nation in both receptions and receiving yards. While he was the first tight end to lead the nation in receiving yards per game (119.6), he joined Purdue's Dave Young as the only tight ends to lead the nation in receptions per game.

Fannin also had a standout performance in the 2024 68 Ventures Bowl, recording 17 receptions for 213 yards—a single-game bowl record for tight ends. Fannin was named MVP of the 68 Ventures Bowl for his efforts.

He led FBS tight ends in many statistical categories, including leading all receivers in receptions of 10+ yards (63), broken tackles (34) and yards after catch (873). He also led all FBS players in receptions per game (9.0) and receiving yards per game (119.6).

Fannin was the highest graded overall player by Pro Football Focus (PFF) at 96.1 as well as the highest graded receiver in the nation by PFF at 96.6. He was also the highest graded pass-catching tight end in run-blocking with a grade of 73.7.

Fannin became the first tight end in FBS history to win a conference’s Player of the Year award, claiming the MAC Vern Smith Leadership Award. He also earned MAC Offensive Player of the Year honors, joining Marco Battaglia (Rutgers, 1995) as the only tight ends to win a conference Offensive Player of the Year award.

Fannin became the first Consensus All-American in Bowling Green history, earning first-team All-America honors from the Walter Camp Football Foundation, American Football Coaches Association, Associated Press and Football Writers Association of America (the latter as a wide receiver).

Fannin accepted an invite to play in the 2025 Senior Bowl.

On December 30, 2024, Fannin announced via Instagram that he would forego his senior season and declare for the 2025 NFL draft.

=== Statistics ===
	Led NCAA Division I FBS
**Bold**	Career best

Year	Team	Games		Receiving				Rushing			
Year	Team	GP	GS	Rec	Yards	Avg	TD	Att	Yards	Avg	TD
2022	Bowling Green	12	1	19	218	11.5	1	10	53	5.3	**4**
2023	Bowling Green	11	8	44	623	**14.2**	6	**14**	41	2.9	0
2024	Bowling Green	**13**	**12**	**117**	**1,555**	13.3	**10**	9	**65**	**7.2**	1
Career		36	21	180	2,396	13.3	17	33	159	4.8	5

== Professional career ==
Pre-draft measurables
Height	Weight	Arm length	Hand span	Wingspan	40-yard dash	10-yard split	20-yard split	20-yard shuttle	Three-cone drill	Vertical jump	Broad jump	Bench press
6 ft 3 1/4 in (1.91 m)	241 lb (109 kg)	32 1/4 in (0.82 m)	9 1/4 in (0.23 m)	6 ft 7 1/4 in (2.01 m)	4.71 s	1.56 s	2.75 s	4.39 s	6.97 s	34.0 in (0.86 m)	9 ft 10 in (3.00 m)	22 reps
All values from NFL Combine

Fannin was selected in the third round with the 67th overall pick of the 2025 NFL Draft by the Cleveland Browns. In Week 1, he made his NFL debut as the starting tight end against the Cincinnati Bengals, recording seven receptions for 63 yards in the loss. In Week 5, Fannin caught his first career touchdown on a 1-yard pass from quarterback Dillon Gabriel in a game against the Minnesota Vikings held in London. In Week 14, Fannin logged his first career 100-yard game against the Tennessee Titans, catching eight passes for 114 yards and a touchdown. In Week 16 against the Buffalo Bills, Fannin scored his first NFL rushing touchdown and added a receiving touchdown. He also eclipsed Kevin Johnson’s franchise rookie receptions mark of 66. He finished the season as the Browns' leading receiver with 72 catches for 731 yards and six touchdowns.

== NFL career statistics ==
Legend
**Bold**	Career high

=== Regular season ===
Year	Team	Games		Receiving					Rushing					Fumbles	
Year	Team	GP	GS	Rec	Yds	Avg	Lng	TD	Att	Yds	Avg	Lng	TD	Fum	Lost
2025	CLE	16	13	**72**	**731**	10.2	35	**6**	7	13	1.9	4	1	1	1
2026	CLE	8	8	37	453	**12.2**	**39**	4	0	0	0.0	0	0	2	2
Career		24	21	109	1184	10.9	39	10	7	13	1.9	4	1	1	1
