= Connor Bazelak =

American football player (born 2000)

Profile
- Position: Quarterback

Personal information
- Born: September 22, 2000 (age 26); Dayton, Ohio, U.S.
- Listed height: 6 ft 3 in (1.91 m)
- Listed weight: 225 lb (102 kg)

Career information
- High school: Archbishop Alter (Kettering, Ohio)
- College: Missouri (2019–2021); Indiana (2022); Bowling Green (2023–2024)
- NFL draft: 2025: undrafted

Career history
- Tampa Bay Buccaneers (2025)

Awards and highlights
- Third-team All-MAC (2024); SEC co-Freshman of the Year (2020)
- Stats at Pro Football Reference

Connor Bazelak (born September 22, 2000) is an American professional football quarterback. He played college football for the Missouri Tigers, Indiana Hoosiers, and Bowling Green Falcons.

== Early life ==
Bazelak grew up in Dayton, Ohio and attended Archbishop Alter High School, where he played basketball and football. As a senior, he passed for over 1,500 yards with 13 touchdowns and two interceptions in a triple option offense out of the wishbone formation. Bazelak committed to play college football at Missouri over offers from Georgia, Purdue, North Carolina State, Kentucky and Vanderbilt.

== College career ==
=== Missouri ===
Bazelak played in three games as a true freshman, allowing him to use a redshirt and maintain an extra season of NCAA eligibility. He started the final game of the season against Arkansas, but tore his ACL midway through the game. Bazelak completed 15 of 21 passes for 144 yards in his true freshman season.

Bazelak took over at quarterback in each of the Tigers' first two games of his redshirt freshman season before being named the team's starter. Bazelak completed 218 of 324 passes for 2,366 yards and seven touchdowns with six interceptions and was named the SEC co-Freshman of the Year. Bazelak was named to the watchlist for the Davey O'Brien Award going into his redshirt sophomore season. He ended his 2021 season appearing in 11 games with 2,548 yards, 16 touchdowns, and 11 interceptions.

=== Indiana ===
On January 6, 2022, Bazelak announced he would be transferring to play for the Indiana Hoosiers.

In week 1, Bazelak threw a game winning touchdown pass with under thirty seconds remaining in the 23–20 victory against Illinois. He became the first Indiana quarterback to pass for 300 yards in a debut since Antwaan Randle El in 1998. In week 3, he threw for a season high 364 yards on 33–55 attempts and two touchdowns against Western Kentucky. On September 24, Bazelak set an Indiana record with 66 pass attempts against Cincinnati. For the Hoosiers, Bazelak appeared in 10 games with nine starts. On the season, he completed 235-of-426 passes for 2,312 yards, 13 touchdowns and 10 interceptions.

On November 29. 2022, Bazelak announced his decision to enter the transfer portal again.

=== Bowling Green ===
On January 13, 2023, Bazelak announced via his personal Twitter that he would be transferring to play for the Bowling Green Falcons.

In his first start with the Falcons, he threw three interceptions in a loss against Liberty. The Following week against Eastern Illinois he started the game 12-of-12 passing for 163 yards and one touchdown before his first incompletion, helping lead the Falcons to victory. He missed the following game against Michigan with a leg injury. On September 30, Bazelek led the Falcons to a 38–27 upset victory against Georgia Tech where he threw his 40th career touchdown pass. Against Minnesota in the Quick Lane Bowl, Bazelak completed 21 passes on 36 attempts for 221 yards and a score while also rushing for a touchdown. Bazelak finished the 2023 season throwing for 1,935 yards and recording 14 total touchdowns.

On December 6, Bazelak announced on his personal Instagram page that he would use his final year of eligibility to return to Bowling Green with hopes of winning a MAC Championship.

In week two, Bazelak threw his 50th collegiate touchdown pass in a near upset against Penn State. Bazelak surpassed 10,000 career passing yards when he threw for 303 yards and two touchdowns in a loss against Old Dominion. In week seven against Northern Illinois Bazelak became the 41st player in FBS history with 1,000 career completions. The following week against Kent State, Bazelak threw for a season high 313 yards and was 23-of-27 passing. His completion percentage of 85.2 set a single game program record for a quarterback with 20 plus attempts.

=== Statistics ===
| Season | Team | Games | | | Passing | | | | | | | | Rushing | | | |
| Season | Team | GP | GS | Record | Cmp | Att | Pct | Yds | Avg | TD | Int | Rtg | Att | Yds | Avg | TD |
|---|---|---|---|---|---|---|---|---|---|---|---|---|---|---|---|---|
| 2019 | Missouri | 3 | 1 | 1–0 | 15 | 21 | 71.4 | 144 | 6.9 | 0 | 0 | 129.0 | 7 | 2 | 0.3 | 0 |
| 2020 | Missouri | 10 | 8 | 5–3 | 218 | 324 | 67.3 | 2,366 | 7.3 | 7 | 6 | 132.1 | 44 | 20 | 0.5 | 2 |
| 2021 | Missouri | 11 | 11 | 6–5 | 246 | 377 | 65.3 | 2,548 | 6.8 | 16 | 11 | 130.2 | 33 | −23 | −0.7 | 0 |
| 2022 | Indiana | 10 | 9 | 3–6 | 235 | 426 | 55.2 | 2,312 | 5.4 | 13 | 10 | 106.1 | 47 | −160 | −3.4 | 1 |
| 2023 | Bowling Green | 11 | 11 | 6–5 | 168 | 278 | 60.6 | 1,935 | 7.0 | 12 | 7 | 128.1 | 44 | −82 | −1.9 | 2 |
| 2024 | Bowling Green | 13 | 13 | 7–6 | 269 | 402 | 66.9 | 3,044 | 7.6 | 18 | 5 | 142.8 | 48 | −91 | −1.9 | 2 |
| Career | | 58 | 53 | 28–25 | 1,151 | 1,828 | 63.0 | 12,349 | 6.8 | 66 | 39 | 127.4 | 223 | −334 | −1.5 | 7 |

== Professional career ==
Pre-draft measurables
| Height | Weight | Arm length | Hand span | Wingspan | 40-yard dash | 10-yard split | 20-yard split | 20-yard shuttle | Three-cone drill |
|---|---|---|---|---|---|---|---|---|---|
| 6 ft 2 1/2 in (1.89 m) | 212 lb (96 kg) | 32 in (0.81 m) | 10 1/8 in (0.26 m) | 6 ft 6 in (1.98 m) | 4.80 s | 1.68 s | 2.75 s | 4.45 s | 7.14 s |
All values from Pro Day

Bazelak signed with the Tampa Bay Buccaneers as an undrafted free agent on May 9, 2025. He was waived on August 26 as part of final roster cuts and re-signed to the practice squad the next day. On November 29, Bazelak was promoted to the active roster from the practice squad ahead of the Buccaneers' Week 13 game against the Arizona Cardinals.

On March 4, 2026, Bazelak re-signed with the Buccaneers. He was waived by Tampa Bay on August 29.

== Personal life ==
Bazelak's father, Len Bazelak, played college basketball at Dartmouth College and holds the school's record for career three-point percentage.

Bazelak has two older sisters, Maddie Bazelak and Libby Bazelak. Maddie Bazelak was a multi-sport athlete at the NCAA Division I level, having played volleyball at Duquesne University and basketball at Ohio University. Libby Bazelak played college basketball at Duquesne University and concluded her college basketball career ranked 24th all-time in program history with 1,111 points.
