= Slippery Rock football =

College football team

- First season: 1898; 128 years ago
- Head coach: Shawn Lutz; 7th season, 70–19 (.787)
- Location: Slippery Rock, Pennsylvania
- Stadium: Mihalik-Thompson Stadium (capacity: 10,000)
- Field: Dispirto Field
- Conference: PSAC
- Colors: Green and white
- All-time record: 527–354–38 (.594)
- Bowl record: 1–2 (.333)

Conference championships
- 9
- Fight song: Slippery Rock fight song
- Mascot: Rocky
- Marching band: Slippery Rock University Marching Pride
- Website: rockathletics.com

The Slippery Rock football program, nicknamed The Rock, represents Slippery Rock University in Slippery Rock, Pennsylvania in the sport of college football. Slippery Rock competes in the Pennsylvania State Athletic Conference which is a part of NCAA Division II football. They play their home games at Mihalik-Thompson Stadium, a 10,000-seat capacity stadium named after Rock coaches N. Kerr Thompson and George Mihalik.

== History ==
Slippery Rock's inaugural football season was in 1898. During their first season, the team compiled a 1–0 record, beating New Castle High School. Slippery Rock did not hire a head coach until the 1906 season, when John B. Price became the first coach in Slippery Rock football history. Over the course of 112 seasons of football, (no season in 1943–44 because of WWII) Slippery Rock has compiled a total record of 527–354–38. The team has captured 9 PSAC Championships: 1939, 1962, 1972, 1973, 1974, 1997 (PSAC-W), 1998 (PSAC-W), 1999 (PSAC-W), 2000 (PSAC-W), 2011 (PSAC-W); as well as 6 state championships: 1924, 1939, 1962, 1972, 1973, 1974. Slippery Rock has had two undefeated seasons, 1924 finishing 9–0 and 1938 ending 8–0. In 1958, Slippery Rock played in its first bowl game, the Beaver Bowl where they defeated the Edinboro Fighting Scots 6–0. Slippery Rock has played in two bowl games since. The 1963 All-Sports Bowl, where they were defeated by Northeast Oklahoma St. 59–12. The most recent bowl game was the 1972 Knute Rockne Bowl losing 27–22 to Bridgeport. Slippery Rock has played in 24 total playoff games and has compiled a record of 12–12.

== Postseason appearances ==
=== NCAA Division II ===
Slippery Rock have made thirteen appearances in the NCAA Division II playoffs, with a combined record of 15–12.

Year	Round	Opponent	Result
1997	First Round; Quarterfinals	Ashland; New Haven	W 30–20; L 21–49
1998	First Round; Quarterfinals; Semifinals	Grand Valley State; Shepherd; Carson–Newman	W 37–14; W 41–39; L 21–47
1999	First Round	IUP	L 20–27 ^{OT}
2013	First Round	Winston-Salem State	L 20–27
2014	First Round	West Chester	L 20–46
2015	First Round; Second Round; Quarterfinals	Virginia Union; Assumption; Shepherd	W 40–21; W 41–39; L 16–28
2018	First Round; Second Round; Quarterfinals	LIU Post; New Haven; Notre Dame (OH)	W 20–14; W 59–20; L 17–21
2019	Second Round; Quarterfinals; Semifinals	Shepherd; Notre Dame (OH); Minnesota State	W 51–30; W 65–59; L 15–58
2021	First Round	Notre Dame (OH)	L 27–37
2022	First Round; Second Round	Assumption; Shepherd	W 17–14; L 27–37
2023	First Round; Second Round; Regional Final	East Stroudsburg; Tiffin; Kutztown	W 45–14; W 45–35; L 16–28
2024	First Round; Second Round; Quarterfinals; Semifinals	New Haven; Kutztown; California (PA); Ferris State	W 14–7; W 25–24 ^{OT} W 31–13; L 38–48
2026	First Round	Charleston (WV)	TBD

=== NCAA Division III ===
Slippery Rock have made one appearance in the NCAA Division III playoffs, with a combined record of 0–1.

Year	Round	Opponent	Result
1974	Semifinals	Ithaca	L 14–27

== Bowl games ==
Date	Bowl	Opponent	Result
November 15, 1958	Beaver Bowl	Edinboro	W 6–0
December 7, 1963	All-Sports Bowl	Northeastern State (OK)	L 19–52
November 24, 1972	Knute Rockne Bowl	Bridgeport	L 22–27

== Head coaches ==
- John B. Price – 1906–07, 3–2–2 record, .571 winning percentage.
- Harry Snyder – 1908–09, 1911–13. 18–8–3 record, .679 winning percentage. Became athletic director a few years later.
- Emil Miller – 1910, 5–3–0 record, .625 winning percentage.
- Arthur Gaut – 1914–17, 16–10–3 record, .603 winning percentage.
- Loyal S. Marshall – 1918–19, 3–7–0 record, .300 winning percentage.
- N. Kerr Thompson – 1920–42, 1945. 126–58–22 record, .674 winning percentage. Led Slippery Rock to 12 Division championships and 8 state championships. Led four of the five unbeaten seasons at the school for football. Also coached basketball and baseball while at Slippery Rock.
- William "Pop" Storer – 1946–52, 30–22–4 record, .571 winning percentage.
- Chester Stackhouse – 1953–54, 5–10–1 record, .344 winning percentage.
- William Meise – 1955–58, 12–17–1 record, .471 winning percentage. Also Track assistant coach at Slippery Rock.
- Charles Godlasky – 1959–64, 31–19–4 record, .611 winning percentage. Took Slippery Rock to three PSAC-Western Division championship, and state championship in 1962. His team also played in the 1963 All-Sports Bowl.
- Jack Olcutt – 1965–66, 7–11–2 record, .400 winning percentage.
- Bob Dispirito – 1967–80, 1987. 79–60–3 record, .567 winning percentage. Coached Slippery Rock to three straight PSAC championships from 1972–74. Earned 2 bowl appearances for Slippery Rock, and led them to the first trip into Michigan Stadium.
- Fred Goldsmith – 1981, 2–7–0 record, .222 winning percentage. Led Slippery Rock team in second trip to Michigan Stadium, losing 14–13 to Wayne State.
- Don Ault – 1982–86, 27–23–0 record, .540 winning percentage. In his first season at Slippery Rock, he was named Coach of the Year by the Pittsburgh Post-Gazette.
- George Mihalik – 1988–2015, 185–109–4 record, .628 winning percentage. Mihalik has the highest wins in school history, and is among the most successful. He has also led Slippery Rock to 12 straight winning seasons at one point during his tenure. He is part of an elite group of college football head coaches in the nation to own a doctorate degree.
- Shawn Lutz – 2016–present.

== Facilities ==
The Rock play their games at N. Kerr Thompson-Mihalik Stadium on Dispirito Field. The stadium name, however, has been changed starting with the 2011 season to Mihalik-Thompson Stadium, in honor of then-current head coach George Mihalik. It is one of few college football stadiums where stadium was named in honor of the then-current head coach. The stadium name is also in honor of N. Kerr Thompson, who was one of the most successful coaches in Slippery Rock history. Dispirito Field was named for former head coach Bob Dispirito who also was a successful coach in Slippery Rock history.

== Traditions ==
"The Rock", located just outside the East endzone of the stadium, was donated by the Army Corps of Engineers in 1995. Players rub the rock every time they take the field prior to each home game.

Announcing the Slippery Rock score has been a tradition at University of Michigan football games since 1959, begun by Michigan Stadium announcer Steve Filipiak. Slippery Rock's scores have also been announced at the games of many other major schools, including Oklahoma, Texas, North Carolina, Stanford, and California. Michigan is the only school that still continues this tradition.

Such is Slippery Rock's popularity in Ann Arbor that The Rock has played three times at the massive Michigan Stadium. First, in front of a Division II-record 61,143 fans, Slippery Rock lost to Shippensburg, 45–14, in 1979. Two years later, over 35,000 were in attendance in 1981 when the Rock took on Wayne State, with Wayne State winning, 14–13. Slippery Rock returned to Michigan Stadium in 2014, against Mercyhurst, losing again, this time by a 45–23 score. There would be 15,121 people who would attend, tiny by Michigan standards but still the largest crowd to watch a Pennsylvania State Athletic Conference game that season.

== Alumni ==
- Greg Hopkins – Arena Football League wide receiver/linebacker, Los Angeles Avengers, was a four year letterman and was a three time All American honoree. Along with being a three time all PSAC selection, he set nine separate school records and had 215 receptions for 3,382 yards.
- Matt Kinsinger – Arena Football League fullback/linebacker for the Chicago Rush. At Slippery Rock, Kinsinger was a defensive lineman and was named Football Gazette All-American.
- Brandon Fusco – Drafted by the Minnesota Vikings in the 6th round. Played center while at Slippery Rock. Became first player in school history to compete in Senior Bowl.
- Ricky Porter – Drafted by the Detroit Lions in the 12th round, 319th overall in 1982.
- Chuck Sanders – Drafted by the San Diego Chargers in the 11th round, 293rd overall in 1986.
- Greg Paterra – Drafted by the Atlanta Falcons in the 11th round, 286th overall in 1989.
- Mike Butterworth – 2008 Free agent, Atlanta Falcons
- David Flick – Canadian Football League
- John Sikora – Arena Football League
