= List of Bowling Green State University alumni =

This is a list of notable people associated with Bowling Green State University, located in the American city of Bowling Green, Ohio.

== Arts and entertainment ==
=== Authors and writers ===
- Fernando Alegría, Chilean poet
- Tony Ardizzone, novelist
- James Baldwin, author, poet (writer in residence)
- Matt Bell, author
- Mary Biddinger, poet
- James Carlos Blake, author
- Philana Marie Boles, author of Glitz, Little Divas, In the Paint, and Blame It on Eve
- Scott Cairns, poet
- Gary Cohn, comic book writer
- Jennifer Crusie, writer
- Jim Daniels, poet and writer
- Tom De Haven, writer
- Anthony Doerr, Pulitzer Prize-winning writer
- Frank Dungan, television producer and writer
- Edmundo Farolan, author and actor
- David Feldman, author of Imponderables
- Robert Ferrigno, writer
- Carolyn Forche, writer
- Charles Fort, poet
- Sally Miller Gearhart, science fiction writer, women's studies pioneer, and early gay rights activist
- Diana Pavlac Glyer, author and expert on J. R. R. Tolkien, C. S. Lewis, and the Inklings
- Darrell Hamamoto, writer
- Joseph D. Haske, author
- Alan Heathcock, fiction writer
- Steve Heller, fiction author
- Brad Hurtado, television producer
- Jack LoGiudice, television writer and producer
- Sandra Markle, children's book author
- Susan Neville, short story writer
- Charles Nicol, writer, expert on Vladimir Nabokov
- William Patrick Patterson, author and fourth way teacher
- Barbara Paul, author
- James Purdy, author
- Arnold Rampersad, Pulitzer Prize-nominated author
- Terry Ryan, writer
- Marc Sumerak, freelance writer, often works on Marvel Comics series
- Jean Thompson, fiction writer
- Anne Valente, author
- Allen Wier, author
- Dara Wier, poet
- Kayla Williams, linguist and author
- Theresa Williams, writer
- Michael Kennedy, screenwriter and producer

=== Actors ===
- Lexi Allen, singer, actress, television personality
- Bernie Casey, former professional football player, actor, and visual artist
- Tim Conway, Emmy Award-winning actor
- Frank Dungan, television producer and Primetime Emmy Award winner
- Quinton Flynn, voice actor
- Robert Patrick, actor
- James Pickens, Jr., actor
- Ric Reitz, actor
- Kathia Rodriguez, actress
- Eva Marie Saint, Academy Award-winning actress
- Ron Sweed, television actor
- Matt Zimmerman, actor

=== Musicians and composers ===
- Uzee Brown Jr, composer
- Chris Castle, folk musician
- David Conte, composer
- Hildward Croes, Aruban musician
- Joseph Dangerfield, composer
- Minnita Daniel-Cox, soprano
- Ray Davis, bass singer and founding member of The Parliaments
- John Douglas, conductor
- Tim Hagans, jazz musician
- Bob Hartman, Christian rock artist and founder of the band Petra
- Jennifer Higdon, Grammy Award and Pulitzer Prize-winning classical music composer
- Michael Holmes, saxophonist
- Eglė Janulevičiūtė, Lithuanian classical pianist
- Marian McPartland, jazz musician
- Mildred Miller, mezzo-soprano, received an honorary degree
- Ric Ocasek, rhythm guitarist and songwriter for The Cars
- Griffen Palmer, country singer-songwriter
- Rich Perry, jazz musician
- Bill Randle, DJ, received an honorary doctorate
- James Swearingen, concert band literature composer
- William Takacs, musician

=== Artists ===
- Robert Archambeau, ceramic artist; worked in the studio of Jun Kaneko; colleague of painter Don Reichert
- Kathrine Baumann, handbag designer, model, and actress
- Barbara Bosworth, large format photographer
- George O. Hughes, painter, poet, performance artist
- Tony Kern, film director, directed A Month of Hungry Ghosts
- Dominick Labino, glass artist, scientist, honorary doctorate
- Tim McCreight, metal smith
- Jason Nelson, pioneering net artist, digital poet
- Ed Sayles, theater director
- William Silvers, wildlife artist, painter for Walt Disney, Industrial Light and Magic, Sony Pictures, DreamWorks, and Warner Brothers
- Douglas Steakley, metal smith and photographer; winner of the 2003 Ansel Adams Award for Conservation Photography
- Rick Valicenti, graphic designer

=== Dancers ===
- Mary Jo Freshley, Korean dance instructor at University of Hawaiʻi at Mānoa
- Judson Laipply, creator of the "Evolution of Dance"

== Athletes ==
=== Olympians ===
- Rob Blake, Hall of Fame ice hockey player, won Stanley Cup in 2001; three-time member of the Canadian Olympic hockey team, winning a gold medal in 2002
- Ralfs Freiberg, played in two Olympics for Latvia.
- Scott Hamilton, professional figure skater and Olympic gold medalist
- Margarita Kalmikova, two-time Olympian swimmer from Latvia
- Ken Morrow, former professional ice hockey player and member of the 1980 USA Olympic hockey team
- Mark Wells, former professional ice hockey player and member of the 1980 USA Olympic hockey team
- Dave Wottle, won an Olympic gold medal for the 800 meter run at the 1972 Summer Olympics

=== Soccer ===
- Bud Lewis, former professional soccer player and head coach at Wilmington College 1975–2017
- Dennis Mepham, former professional soccer player for the Cleveland Force (1978–1988)
- Dana Veth, former professional soccer player

=== Basketball ===
- Kate Achter, collegiate basketball coach
- Harold Anderson, former college basketball coach; Basketball Hall of Fame member
- Tom Collen, collegiate basketball coach
- Antonio Daniels, former professional basketball player
- Tom Hancock, basketball coach
- Bob Hill, professional basketball coach
- Richaun Holmes, professional basketball player for the Washington Wizards
- Howard Komives, former professional basketball player for the New York Knicks, Detroit Pistons, Buffalo Braves, and Kansas City Kings
- Jay Larranaga, former professional basketball player and current member of the Los Angeles Clippers coaching staff
- Keith McLeod, former professional basketball player
- Steve Merfeld, basketball coach
- Charlie Parker, basketball coach
- Daeqwon Plowden, professional basketball player for the Atlanta Hawks, of the National Basketball Association
- Isaac Rosefelt, American-Israeli former basketball player
- Richard Skeel, basketball coach
- Nate Thurmond, former professional basketball player; seven-time NBA All-Star; member of the Naismith Memorial Basketball Hall of Fame; named one of the 50 Greatest Players in NBA History

=== Baseball ===
- Larry Arndt, infielder for the Oakland Athletics; BGSU Baseball Hall of Fame member
- Burke Badenhop, former MLB pitcher
- Doug Bair, former professional baseball player
- Jon Berti, professional baseball player currently with the Miami Marlins
- Orel Hershiser, former professional baseball player, currently an analyst for the Los Angeles Dodgers
- Jim Joyce, former MLB umpire
- Roger McDowell, former professional baseball player and coach
- Nolan Reimold, former MLB baseball player
- Andy Tracy, former professional baseball player; current manager for the Columbus Clippers of the International League
- Chet Trail, former professional baseball player

=== Football ===
- Martin Bayless, former professional football player
- Karl Brooks, professional football player currently with the Green Bay Packers of the National Football League
- Khary Campbell, former professional football player
- Jeff Genyk, current tight ends coach and special teams coordinator for the University of Wisconsin football team
- Joe Green, former professional player for the New York Giants
- Jeff Groth, former professional football player
- Josh Harris, professional football player, last with the New York Giants
- Omar Jacobs, professional football player currently with the Jacksonville Sharks of the Arena Football League
- Chris Jones, professional football player with the New England Patriots
- Kamar Jorden, professional football player currently with the Calgary Stampeders of the Canadian Football League
- Kory Lichtensteiger, professional football player currently with the Washington Redskins
- Scotty Miller, professional football player, Super Bowl LV champion
- Quintin Morris, professional football player currently with the Buffalo Bills of the National Football League
- Scott Mruczkowski, professional football player
- Don Nehlen, former player who became a highly successful coach at West Virginia University and college football hall of fame member
- Kevin O'Brien, former professional football player
- Dean Pees, NFL defensive coordinator
- Doyt Perry, former college football coach and college football hall of fame member
- Dave Preston, former professional football player
- Robert Redd, professional football player
- Bob Reynolds, former professional football player
- Jamie Rivers, former professional football player
- Bob Schnelker, former professional football player
- Bob Seaman, football coach
- Doug Smith, former professional football player
- Fred Sturt, former professional football player
- Shaun Suisham, professional football player currently with the Pittsburgh Steelers
- Vince Villanucci, former professional football player
- Phil Villapiano, former professional football player; four-time Pro Bowler
- Mike Weger, former professional football player
- Charlie Williams, former professional football player
- Bob Wolfe, football coach

=== Hockey ===
- Kevin Bieksa, professional ice hockey player currently with the Anaheim Ducks
- Aris Brimanis, professional ice hockey player currently with the Hannover Scorpions
- Dan Bylsma, former professional ice hockey player and former head coach of the Seattle Kraken
- Gino Cavallini, former professional hockey player, scorer for the Falcons NCAA National Championship, winning overtime goal
- Greg de Vries, former professional ice hockey player, won Stanley Cup in 2001
- Dave Ellett, former professional ice hockey player
- Nelson Emerson, former professional ice hockey player
- Alex Foster, professional ice hockey player
- Mark Friedman (born 1995), NHL player
- Garry Galley, former professional ice hockey player
- Andrew Hammond, professional ice hockey player
- Brian Hills, former professional ice hockey player, current associate head coach of the RIT Tigers men's hockey team
- Brian Holzinger, former professional ice hockey player and Hobey Baker Award winner
- Mike Johnson, former professional ice hockey player, currently an analyst for the NHL Network, and TSN and color commentator for the Winnipeg Jets
- Dan Kane, former professional ice hockey player
- Ken Klee, former professional ice hockey player
- Mike Liut, former professional ice hockey player
- Brian MacLellan, professional ice hockey player, won Stanley Cup in 1989; current President of Hockey Operations for the Washington Capitals
- Jon Matsumoto, professional hockey player currently with the San Jose Sharks
- George McPhee, former professional ice hockey player, Hobey Baker Award winner, General Manager of NHL's Vegas Golden Knights and former GM of Washington Capitals
- Todd Reirden, former professional ice hockey player and former head coach for the Washington Capitals; won Stanley Cup in 2018
- Dan Sexton, professional ice hockey player currently with the Tampa Bay Lightning
- Jonathan Sigalet, professional ice hockey player playing for Brynäs IF in the Swedish Hockey League
- Jordan Sigalet, former professional ice hockey player; currently the goaltending coach for the Calgary Flames of the National Hockey League
- Wayne Wilson, current head coach of the RIT Tigers men's hockey team
- Paul Ysebaert, former professional ice hockey player

=== Other ===
- Alissa Czisny, figure skater and 2009 US Figure Skating National Champion
- Mike McCullough, professional golfer
- Nick Mileti, former owner of Cleveland Cavaliers, Cleveland Indians, Cleveland Crusaders, and writer of Closet Italians
- Kurt Weaver, rugby match official

== Politics ==
=== Ambassadors ===
- Daniel Ayalon, former Israeli ambassador to the U.S.
- Leonardo Neher, US ambassador to Upper Volta

=== Judicial ===
- John R. Adams, federal judge on the United States District Court for the Northern District of Ohio
- James Henry Gorbey, United States federal judge
- Brenda Hollis, chief persecutor in the Special Court for Sierra Leone
- James R. Knepp II, United States district judge
- Sara Elizabeth Lioi, United States district judge
- James H. Wakatsuki, justice of the Supreme Court of Hawaii

=== Activists ===
- Dominick Evans, activist, transferred to Wright State
- Sam Pollock, labor activist, did not graduate
- Baldemar Velasquez, labor activist, received an honorary Doctor of Humane Letters

=== Politicians ===
- Elizabeth M. Boyer, lawyer, writer, publisher, and feminist founder of WEAL
- Dan Greenberg, former politician, Heritage Foundation analyst, and writer for Cato Institute; leader of the Advance Arkansas Institute
- Nick Licata, Seattle politician and activist
- Mike Reichenbach, South Carolina politician
- Pierre-Célestin Rwigema, 7th prime minister of Rwanda
- Edmond Spaho, Democratic Party of Albania MP
- Robin Weirauch, politician

==== United States Congress ====
- Robert P. Hanrahan, former U.S. congressional representative (R-IL)
- Gene Krebs, former Ohio state representative (R-OH, 1993–2000)
- Bob Latta, U.S. congressional representative (R-OH)
- Tom Luken, former mayor of Cincinnati, Ohio and U.S. congressional representative (D-OH)
- Tim Ryan, U.S. congressional representative (D-OH)

==== City government ====
- Janeé Ayers, labor organizer, member of the Detroit city council
- Hou Chong-wen, deputy mayor of Chiayi City, Taiwan
- Sandi Jackson, Chicago alderman
- Paul Muenzer, former mayor of Naples, Florida (1992–1996)
- Don Plusquellic, 59th mayor of Akron, Ohio
- Kathy Sheehan, mayor of Albany, New York (D)

==== State of Ohio government ====
- Bruce Johnson, 63rd lieutenant governor of Ohio
- Betty Montgomery, former Ohio attorney general and state auditor (R)
- Scott Nein, former Republican member of the Ohio General Assembly

===== Ohio House of Representatives =====
- Robin Belcher, former Democrat member of the Ohio House of Representatives
- Terry Boose, former Republican member of the Ohio House of Representatives
- Tim Brown, former Republican member of the Ohio House of Representative
- Rex Damschroder, former Republican member of the Ohio House of Representatives
- Charlie Earl, former Ohio state representative, Libertarian candidate in the 2014 Ohio gubernatorial election
- Bruce Goodwin, former Republican member of the Ohio House of Representatives
- Charles Kurfess, former member of the Ohio House of Representatives and judge
- Derek Merrin, Republican member of the Ohio House of Representatives
- Chris Redfern, former Ohio state representative and former chairman of the Ohio Democratic Party (D)
- Douglas Swearingen, Jr., Republican member of the Ohio House of Representatives and former baseball player

===== Ohio Senate =====
- Steve Buehrer, former member of the Ohio Senate and former director of the Ohio Bureau of Workers' Compensation
- Kevin Coughlin, former Republican member of the Ohio Senate
- M. Ben Gaeth, former member of the Ohio Senate
- Randy Gardner, Ohio state senator (R) and chancellor of the Ohio Department of Higher Education
- Theresa Gavarone, Republican member of the Ohio Senate

==== Other state governments ====
- Tim Berry, Indiana state auditor (R)
- Arnold E. Brown, first African-American elected to represent Bergen County in the New Jersey Legislature
- Dan Carter, state representative, Connecticut's 2nd Assembly District
- Tal Hutchins, Democrat member of the West Virginia House of Delegates
- Sue Rocca, former Republican member of the Michigan House of Representatives
- John Villapiano, former Democrat member of the New Jersey General Assembly and former professional football player

== News ==
- Karen T. Borchers, former photojournalist for The Mercury News; shared a Pulitzer Prize for covering the 1989 Loma Prieta earthquake
- Ken W. Clawson, journalist and spokesman for President Richard Nixon
- David Dietz, science journalist, 1937 Pulitzer Prize winner, honorary degree
- Beth Macy, journalist and non-fiction writer; author of Truevine
- Jason Schmitt, journalist, director of Paywall: The Business of Scholarship

=== Broadcast journalism ===
- Leon Bibb, WEWS news anchor
- Herb Clarke, weatherman
- Steve Hartman, CBS News correspondent
- Allison Payne, journalist and anchorwoman
- Wilma Smith, former television anchor, Lower Great Lakes Emmy Award winner
- Heather Walker, Suncoast Emmy Award winner

=== Sports journalism ===
- Jay Crawford, ESPN sportscaster
- Jim Day, sportscaster
- Mike Emrick, NHL on NBC play-by-play announcer
- Everett Fitzhugh, Seattle Kraken play-by-play. First Black play-by-play announcer in NHL history.
- Jason Jackson, ESPN sportscaster
- Steve Mason, sports journalist with ESPN
- Steve Mears, NHL Network sportscaster
- Grant Napear, sports journalist and former lacrosse player

== Science ==
=== Geology ===
- Conrad Allen, geologist and inventor
- Barbara Bedette, paleontologist, cataloged 30,860 Cenozoic molluscs

=== Mathematics and statistics ===
- Jie Chen, statistician with interdisciplinary biology research
- Andrew Ogg, mathematician, creator of Ogg's formula, and involved in the creation of the Grothendieck–Ogg–Shafarevich formula, and the Néron–Ogg–Shafarevich criterion

=== Sociology ===
- Howard E. Aldrich, sociologist and business theorist
- Anthony Walsh, criminologist and author
- William Julius Wilson, university professor at Harvard, sociologist, and author; 80th president of the American Sociological Association; advisor to Sudhir Venkatesh

=== Psychology ===
- Russell Barkley, clinical psychologist
- Ralph Blair, psychotherapist and LGBT advocate
- J. Bruce Overmier, experimental psychologist
- Charlie Reeve, professor of psychology
- Dorothy M. Tucker, psychologist and activist

=== Biology ===
- John E. Dohms, biologist specializing in avian disease pathology; member of the BGSU lacrosse team
- William Eugene Evans, marine biologist and 5th National Oceanic and Atmospheric Administration president
- Dan O'Brien, wildlife biologist and author
- Sally Rockey, entomologist and former deputy director of the National Institutes of Health
- Seymour Van Gundy, nematologist

=== Technology ===
- James G. Nell, electrical engineer involved in the development of GERAM
- George Sweigert, first inventor to patent the cordless telephone, radio engineer
- Jeremy Zawodny, computer technologist, MySQL promoter, Linux Magazine columnist

=== Chemistry ===
- Gary Keck, organic chemist specialized in synthesis of natural products; developer of Keck asymmetric allylation
- John Michael Ramsey, analytical chemist specializing in microfluidics and nanofluidics

=== Communications ===
- Arthur P. Bochner, communications scholar
- Suresh Canagarajah, Sri Lankan linguist specializing in translanguaging and linguistic imperialism
- Bradley S. Greenberg, communications theorist
- Joan Kaderavek, speech language pathologist

=== Economics ===
- William Easterly, development economist, author of The Elusive Quest for Growth and The Tyranny of Experts
- Paul Chongkun Hong, professor of operations management

=== Political science ===
- Roger A. Coate, political scientist, former professor at the University of South Carolina
- David J. Jackson, political science professor at BGSU
- W. Wesley McDonald, political scientist, author of Russell Kirk and the Age of Ideology

== Business and philanthropy ==
- Jeffrey Boutelle, CEO of Pharmavite
- Judith Craven, leadership roles in Luby's and Sysco
- Otara Gunewardene, Sri Lankan founder of Odel
- Michael C. Heim, CIO of Eli Lilly and Company
- Carole Kariuki, CEO of the Kenyan Private Sector Alliance
- Shantanu Narayen, CEO of Adobe Systems
- Deborah Thigpen, entrepreneur and publicist

== Historians ==
- Mary Beckinsale, art historian, president emeritus of Studio Arts College International, honorary degree
- Robert Hugh Ferrell, historian focusing on World War I and American foreign policy
- Stanley Kutler, historian who sued for the release of tapes relating to Watergate
- Robert L. Paquette, historian, cofounder of the Alexander Hamilton Institute for the Study of Western Civilization
- William J. Reese, education historian
- H. Micheal Tarver, Latin American historian; Commissioner on the Arkansas History Commission and Arkansas Historical Records Advisory Board

== Military ==
- John N. Abrams, four-star general and commander of the United States Army Training and Doctrine Command
- Niles Fulwyler, former US Army major general and former commanding general of the White Sands Missile Range

== Academic administrators ==
- Victor Boschini, chancellor of Texas Christian University
- Dean L. Bresciani, president of North Dakota State University
- Rosa Roberto Carter, former president of the University of Guam
- Erma Johnson Hadley, first African-American chancellor of Tarrant County College
- Sarah Harder, feminist and former president of the American Association of University Women
- William N. Johnston, 16th president of Wesley College (Delaware)
- Adena Williams Loston, president of St. Philip's College, San Antonio, Texas; former Chief Education Officer at NASA
- Kathleen M. Murray, 14th president of Whitman College, 21st president of Hamline University, acting president of Macalester College
- Jack Ohle, president of Gustavus Adolphus College
- Everett Piper, former president of Oklahoma Wesleyan University and political columnist

== Other ==
- Robert Balling, climate change denier
- Peter Manto, bishop of the Reformed Episcopal Church's Diocese of the Central States
