= Mary Beckinsale =

English art historian (died 2019)

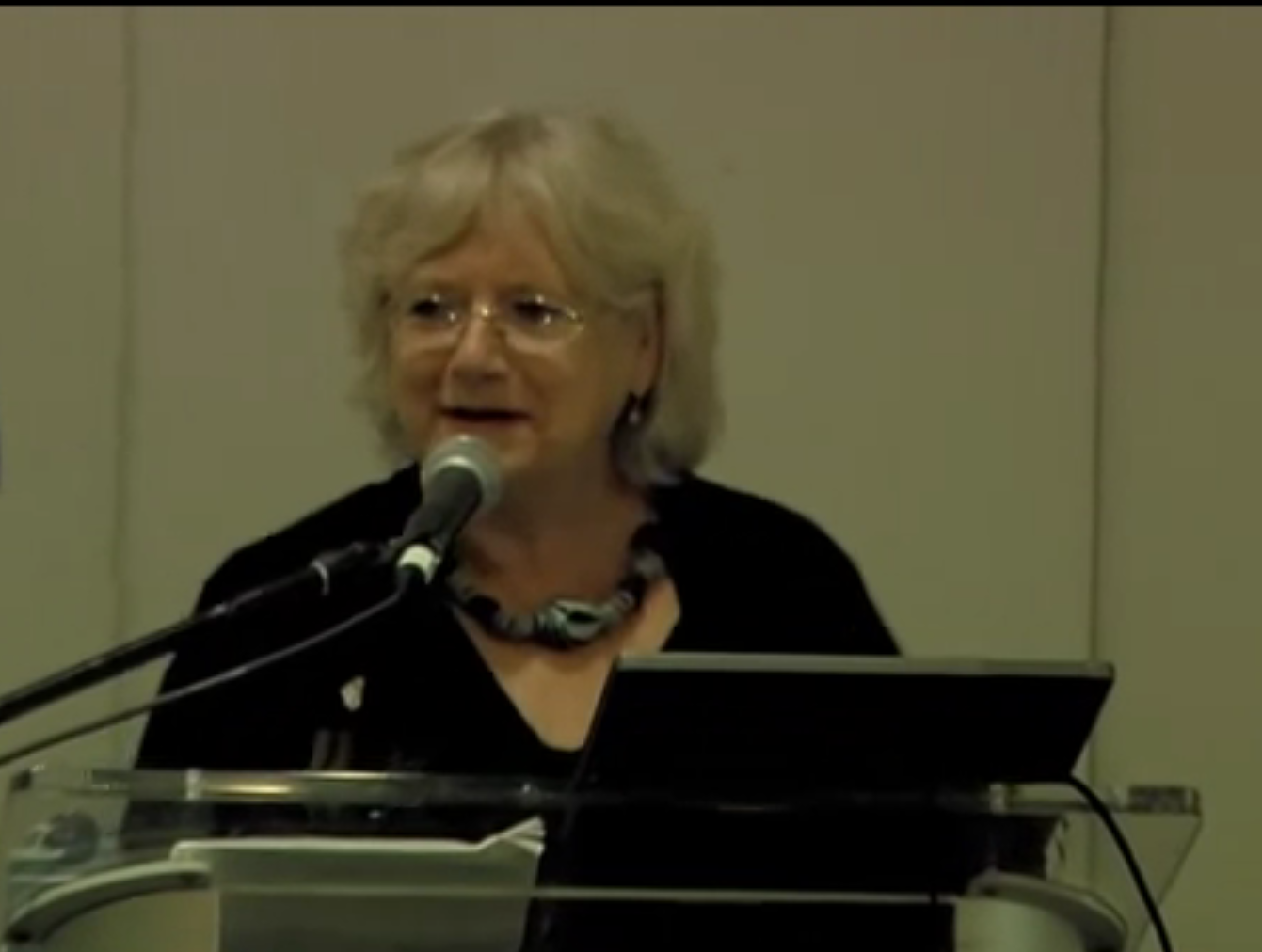
Mary Beckinsale. 2011

Mary Beckinsale was an English art historian and President Emeritus of Studio Arts College International (SACI).

== Biography ==
=== Early life and education ===
Mary Beckinsale is the daughter of Dr. Robert P. Beckinsale, Professor of Geography of University College Oxford. She attended Oxford High School and went on to take a B.A. in Art History at Newnham College, Cambridge. In 1970, she graduated from the Warburg Institute, University of London with an MPhil in Cultural Studies. She spent two years on a Leverhulme Scholarship in Spain, studying in the archive of the Indies in Sevilla.

=== Career ===
From 1975 to 1978, she taught in the Bar Convent School in York, going on to teach at the Università Cattolica del Sacro Cuore in Milan. She was director of American Institute For Foreign Study (AIFS) in Florence, Italy, in 1984–1985, and then became Dean at SACI, an American not-for-profit overseas university art program, until 1995 when she became the Director of SACI. Under her direction, SACI acquired the Palazzo dei Cartelloni in 1999 and the SACI Jules Maidoff Palazzo for the Visual Arts in 2006. In 2006, she became President of SACI until she retired in 2013. Mary Beckinsale has lectured internationally at many different universities on the History of Art.

Mary passed unexpectedly on September 22, 2019, and is buried in her beloved Florence. She is survived by her husband, (Jules Maidoff) her two children, (Ben Ginsborg and Lisa Ginsborg), and her six step-children (Natasha Maidoff, Vittoria Maidoff, Carol Milligan, Kirste Milligan, Lee Maidoff, and Jonah Maidoff).

== Honors ==
7 August 2010, Beckinsale received an honorary degree from Bowling Green State University.
