= McCreight =

McCreight is a surname. Notable people with the surname include:

- Edward M. McCreight (born 1945), American computer scientist
- John Foster McCreight (1827–1913), Canadian lawyer and politician
- Kimberly McCreight, American author
- Tim McCreight (born 1951), American artist
