= Michael Heim =

Michael Heim is the name of:

- Michael C. Heim, vice president of information technology and chief information officer of Eli Lilly and Company
- Michael Henry Heim (1943–2012), UCLA translator and Professor of Slavic Studies and Literatures
- Michael R. Heim (born 1944), American author and educator
