= George Alexander (artist) =

Muscogee contemporary painter (born 1990)

- Education: Institute of American Indian Arts; Studio Arts College International (SACI)
- Known for: Paintings featuring an astronaut on horseback, surrealist style, focus on American Indian heritage
- Notable work: You Found Me, You Should Have Never Lost Me
- Style: Surrealism
- Movement: Contemporary Native American Art

George Alexander, known under the pseudonym Ofuskie, is a Muscogee contemporary painter who focuses on American Indian heritage. A common motif in his artwork is the astronaut on horseback. His work has been featured in major metropolitan museums including the National Gallery of Art in Washington D.C.

== Biography ==
Alexander is a Muscogee Creek painter that is currently residing in Santa Fe, New Mexico. His father was Muscogee and his mother was white. He is a citizen of the Muscogee Nation. He owns a studio in Downtown Santa Fe Plaza.

Alexander began to draw to pass time while young when his parents were in the hospital. His parents died within 8 months when he was 14.

== Education ==
Alexander earned a Bachelor of Fine Arts in 2015 from the Institute of American Indian Arts. He went on to earn a master's degree in Fine Arts in 2019 from the Studio Arts College International (SACI) in Florence, Italy.

== Art ==
His art style has been described as surrealist. Ofuskie is known for paintings with a figure on a horseback wearing an astronaut head. Alexander's medium of choice for his paintings is acrylic paint. His paintingYou Found Me, You Should Have Never Lost Me was showcased in an exhibition The Land Carries Our Ancestors: Contemporary Art by Native Americans in Washington, D.C. at the National Gallery of Art. This painting has a shirtless male figure wearing astronaut helmet riding on a horseback in an alleyway in a city.

== Sources ==
1. Agency, Wend. 2023. "Two Dimensions." Western Art & Architecture. July 6, 2023. https://westernartandarchitecture.com/august-september-2023/two-dimensions
2. Harper, Braden. 2024. "Ofuskie Projects His Passion for Painting and Indigenous People through Acrylics." MVSKOKE Media. April 12, 2024. https://www.mvskokemedia.com/ofuskie-projects-his-passion-for-painting-and-indigenous-people-through-acrylics/.
3. Hurt, Douglas A (2000). The shaping of a Creek (Muscogee) homeland in Indian territory, 1828–1907 (Thesis). ProQuest 304613394.
4. Jansen, Steve. 2023. "Work in Progress with George Alexander." Southwest Contemporary. October 27, 2023. https://southwestcontemporary.com/george-alexander-studio-visit/.
5. McLean, Ian (2013). "Contemporaneous Traditions: The World in Indigenous Art/ Indigenous Art in the World". Humanities Research. 19 (2): 47–60. ProQuest 1418181122.
6. Mitchell, Natasha (Winter 2012). "The Muscogee Creek Indian Freedmen Band Association Seeks Federal Recognition as a Tribe". The Crisis. 119 (1): 51. ProQuest 1293357236.
7. Morphy, Howard (2001). "Seeing Aboriginal Art in the Gallery". Humanities Research. 8 (1): 37–50.
8. "Multidimensional by George Alexander | Amy Kaslow Gallery." n.d. Amykaslowgallery.com. Accessed May 5, 2024. https://amykaslowgallery.com/art/multidimensional-by-george-alexander.
9. Smith, Jaune Quick-to-See, Joy Harjo, and Shana Bushyhead Condill. The Land Carries Our Ancestors: Contemporary Art by Native Americans. Princeton University Press, 2023.
10. "You Found Me, You Should Have Never Lost Me." n.d. THE HORSEMAN FOUNDATION. Accessed May 5, 2024. https://www.thehorsemanfoundation.org/you-found-me-you-should-have-never-lost-me.
