= Zawodny =

Zawodny is a surname. Notable people with the surname include:

- Janusz K. Zawodny (1921–2012), Polish-American historian, political scientist, soldier, and resistance fighter
- Jeremy Zawodny, American database administrator
