= The Tyranny of Experts =

2014 book by William Easterly

- Author: William Easterly
- Language: English
- Subject: Development Economics
- Publisher: Basic Books
- Publication date: March 4, 2014, February on Kindle
- Pages: 416
- ISBN: 978-0465031252

The Tyranny of Experts: Economists, Dictators, and the Forgotten Rights of the Poor is a 2014 book by the development economist William Easterly. It traces the history of the fight against global poverty, and examines the structural incentives of development. Easterly contends that poverty reduction has been used as a tactic to take away the rights of the poor and give power to the state and corporations. He suggests poverty reduction is better served by greater respect for individual freedom than a reliance on technocracy.

== Themes ==
The book argues that there are no simple answers for promoting economic development and that the best hope is to support economic, political, and personal freedom worldwide. The book is similar to Easterly's earlier books on economic development, The Elusive Quest for Growth and The White Man's Burden. The book argues that in order for development to succeed, the principles of development should be correct first and must be built bottom up. Consequently, it does not present practical solutions to modern economical development issues, but rather argues for debates to take place for the best way forward in development economics. This has led many reviewers to criticize it for not presenting practical solutions.

== Reception ==
=== Self-promotion ===
Shortly after the release of the book, Easterly wrote an article for Foreign Policy summarizing the key arguments of the book.

Easterly also wrote an op-ed for Seattle Times describing the themes of his book, and taking issue with the approach used by Bill Gates to fight poverty.

=== Book reviews ===
Dalibor Rohac reviewed the book favorably for The Umlaut, writing, "There are no silver-bullet solutions to poverty and underdevelopment. Instead of trying to find them, policymakers ought to simply respect individual rights—including the rights of poor people." Clive Crook also reviewed the book favorably for Bloomberg View.

The New York Times called the book "bracingly iconoclastic."

Publishers Weekly published a critical review of the book, concluding, "This loose, sometimes incoherent collection of high-minded notes does not add up to a convincing thesis or argument. Easterly tries to craft global solutions, but fails to come up with practical proposals that will work in the messy world beyond his neighborhood."

Carol Graham, writing for the Journal of Economic Literature, suggests that he "fails to note that myriad impoverished individuals cannot exercise these freedoms due to low expectations or compromised rights."

Writing in the Wall Street Journal, Sarah Chayes was also critical: "Mr. Easterly calls for a profound overhaul of the way powerful nations conceive of and implement aid—and, more important, of the broader foreign-policy decision-making of which aid is a component. That change is needed. It's just not clear this book is crisp or cogent enough to help advance it."

Kirkus Reviews described the book more neutrally, with the concluding sentence: "A sharply written polemic intended to stir up debate about the aims of global anti-poverty campaigns."

The book was also reviewed on many blogs.

=== Other mentions ===
Economist Tyler Cowen, writing on the Marginal Revolution blog, called the book "Easterly’s most libertarian book" and "self-recommending."
