= H. Micheal Tarver =

American academic (born 1958)

Hollis Micheal Tarver
- Born: 1958 (age 67–68); Baton Rouge, Louisiana, U.S.
- Occupation: Historian

Hollis Micheal Tarver Denova (born 1958) is an American author, historian, and university professor emeritus, with a Doctor of Philosophy degree from Bowling Green State University. Tarver is the son of Rosemary Tarver (née Rosemary Lucille Denova, 1937–1999) and Cecil Donald Tarver Sr. (b. 1933).

Tarver is a Corresponding Member (USA) of the Academia Nacional de la Historia (Venezuela).

In addition to being an alumnus of Bowling Green State University and the University of Louisiana at Lafayette, Tarver is a graduate of the United States Army Military Police School. Tarver is the immediate-past editor of the World History Bulletin for the World History Association. Tarver is a former dean of the College of Arts and Humanities at Arkansas Tech University. He is also the past executive secretary of the Southeast World History Association (SEWHA).

Tarver was a 1998–99 Fulbright Senior Scholar to Venezuela, a 2001–03 Fulbright Alumni Initiative Award recipient, a 2004 Fulbright-Hays Award for Advanced Study in China participant, and a 2007–08 Fulbright-Hays Award recipient for Advanced Study in Mexico.

Among Tarver's awards and fellowships are a 2001–02 Fellowship from the Gilder Lehrman Institute of American History, a 2002 Special Humanities Award from the Louisiana Endowment for the Humanities, and 2007 Faculty Excellence Award for Scholarship from Arkansas Tech University. He is a former chairman of the Gran Colombian Studies Committee of the Conference on Latin American History and past president of the Southeast World History Association.

Tarver served (2022–2024) as chairman of the Arkansas History Commission and the Arkansas Historical Records Advisory Board. Tarver was appointed by Governor Asa Hutchinson for a term that expired in 2025. In addition, Tarver is a member of the Grupo de Estudios Venezuela - Estados Unidos (GEVEU) at the Universidad de Los Andes (Mérida). Tarver also serves on the editorial board of Histories, an international, peer-reviewed, open access journal published quarterly online by MDPI.

== Bibliography ==
- Venezuela and the United States on the Threshold of the Cold War. New York, New York: Bloomsbury Academic, 2026. H. Micheal Tarver and Francisco Soto Oráa. ISBN 978-1666-9159-76
- South America: From European Contact to Independance. New York, New York: Bloomsbury Academic, 2025. H. Micheal Tarver and Carlos E. Márquez Petit. ISBN 978-1440-8791-42
- The United States and Venezuela during the First World War: Cordial Relations of Suspicious Cooperation. Lanham, Maryland: Lexington Books Imprint - Rowman & Littlefield, 2021. ISBN 978-1-4985-1109-4.
- Daily Life of Women: An Encyclopedia from Ancient Times to the Present. Santa Barbara, California: Greenwood Imprint - ABC-CLIO, 2020. Colleen Boyett, H. Micheal Tarver, and Mildred Diane Gleason, Editors. ISBN 978-1-4408-4692-2. Recipient of a 2021 Dartmouth Medal Honorable Mention.
- The History of Venezuela. Second Edition. Santa Barbara, California: Greenwood Imprint - ABC-CLIO, 2018. ISBN 978-1-4408-5773-7 (with contributions by Alfredo Angulo Rivas and Julia C. Frederick)
- The Spanish Empire: A Historical Encyclopedia. Santa Barbara, California: ABC-CLIO, 2016. H. Micheal Tarver, editor; Emily Slape, assistant editor. ISBN 978-1-4408-4570-3.
- Warren G. Harding: Harbinger of Normalcy. Series: First Men, America's Presidents. Hauppauge, New York: Nova Science Publishers, 2012. ISBN 978-1614708759 (with Mildred Diane Gleason)
- "Reflections on the Importance of Teaching the Spanish Borderlands in the U.S. History Class". World History Bulletin XXII (Fall 2006): 34–35.
- The History of Venezuela. Westport, Connecticut: Greenwood, 2005. ISBN 0-313-33525-7 (with Julia C. Frederick)
- El Fracaso de un Sueño: Un Breve Análisis de la Insurgencia en Venezuela, 1960-1968. Mérida, Mérida, Venezuela: Universidad de Los Andes, Consejo de Publicaciones, 2004. ISBN 980-11-0811-8 (with contributions by Alfredo Angulo Rivas and Luis Loaiza Rincón)
- The Rise and Fall of Venezuelan President Carlos Andrés Pérez: An Historical Examination, Volume II: The Later Years, 1973–2004. Lewiston, New York: Edwin Mellen Press, 2004. ISBN 0-7734-6246-5 (with contributions by Alfredo Angulo Rivas, Luis Loaiza Rincón, and Luis Caraballo Vivas)
- "Foreword." Establishment of Environmentalism on the U.S. Political Agenda in the Second Half of the Twentieth Century – The Brothers Udall., By Henry B. Sirgo. Lewiston, New York: Edwin Mellen Press, 2004. ISBN 0-7734-6358-5.
- "A Historical Perspective of Massage." Massage Therapy: Principles and Practices, Second Edition. Philadelphia, Pennsylvania: Saunders, 2003. Susan Salvo, editor. ISBN 0-7216-0028-X
- "Latin American History." The World History Highway: A Guide to Internet Resources. New York, New York: Sharpe, 2002. Dennis Trinkle and Scott Merriman, editors. ISBN 0-7656-0906-1
- The Rise and Fall of Venezuelan President Carlos Andrés Pérez: An Historical Examination, Volume I: The Early Years, 1936–1973. Lewiston, New York: Edwin Mellen Press, 2001. ISBN 0-7734-7377-7 (with contributions by Alfredo Angulo Rivas, Luis Loaiza Rincón, and Luis Caraballo Vivas)
- The Cambridge World History of Food. New York, New York: Cambridge University Press, 2000. Kenneth F. Kiple and Kriemhild Ornelas, editors. ISBN 0-521-40216-6. (associate editor)
- The Cambridge World History of Human Disease. New York, New York: Cambridge University Press, 1993. Kenneth F. Kiple, editor. ISBN 0-521-33286-9 (associate editor)
