= Minnita Daniel-Cox =

American singer

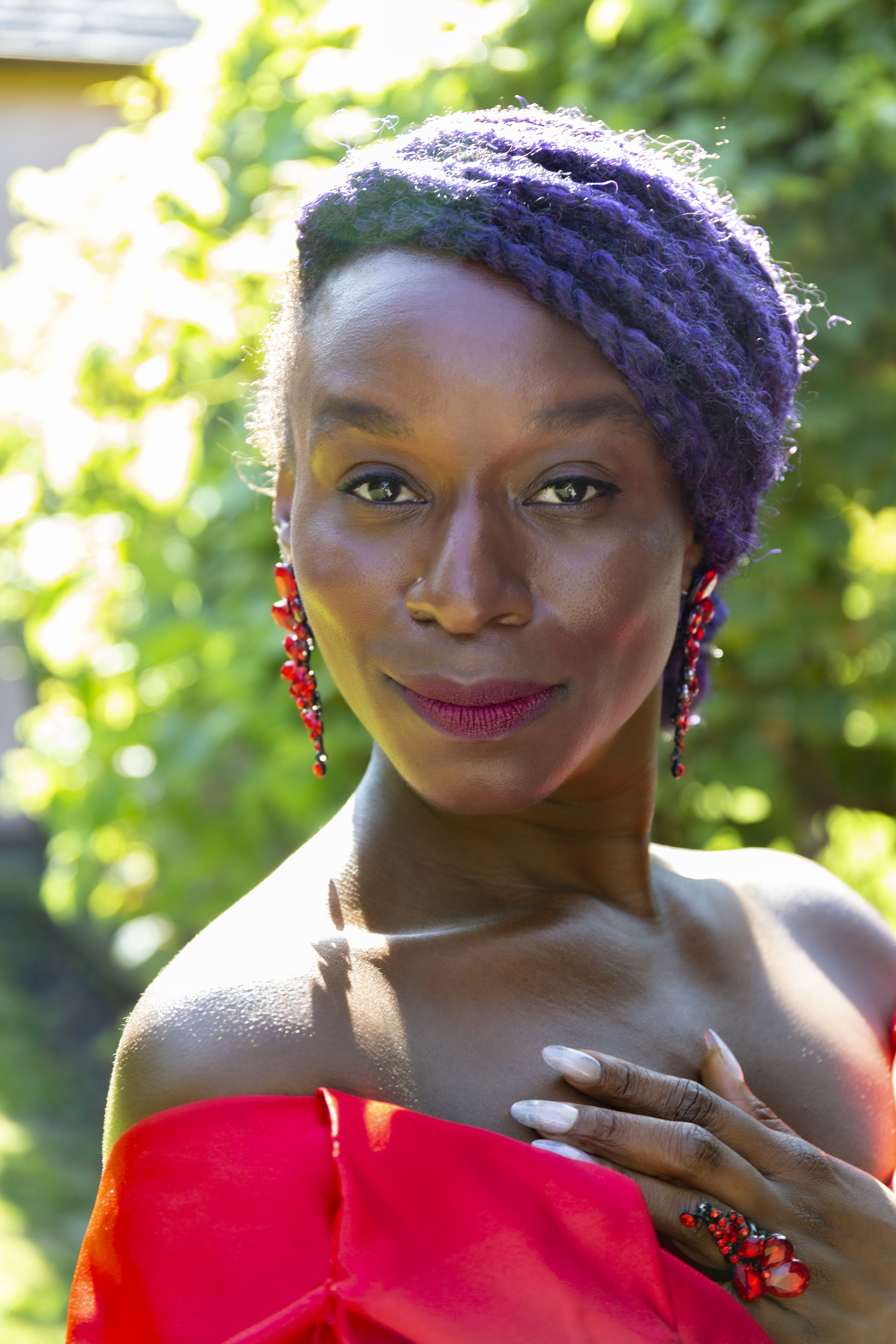

Dr. Minnita Daniel-Cox, an African-American soprano, founded the Dunbar Music Archive. She teaches at University of Dayton as an Associate Professor of Voice and Voice Area Coordinator.

== Education ==
Daniel-Cox received her Bachelor of Music in Music Performance degree from Bowling Green State University. She received both her Master of Music and Doctorate of Musical Arts degrees from University of Michigan.

== Scholarship ==
Daniel-Cox's research regarding the musical settings of texts by poet and Dayton native, Paul Laurence Dunbar led to her establishment of the Dunbar Music Archive (DMA). She travels internationally lecturing about and performing excerpts from the archive. She is the recipient of two National Endowment for the Humanities grants and a grant from the Mellon Foundation.

Written representations of her research have appeared in Classical Singer Magazine and the Journal of Singing.

== Performance ==
Daniel-Cox regularly performs with the Dayton Philharmonic Orchestra, the Springfield Symphony Orchestra, the Miami Valley Symphony Orchestra, the Bach Society of Dayton, and Dayton Opera.
