= Palazzo dei Cartelloni =

Coordinates: 43°46′31.71″N 11°15′5.55″E

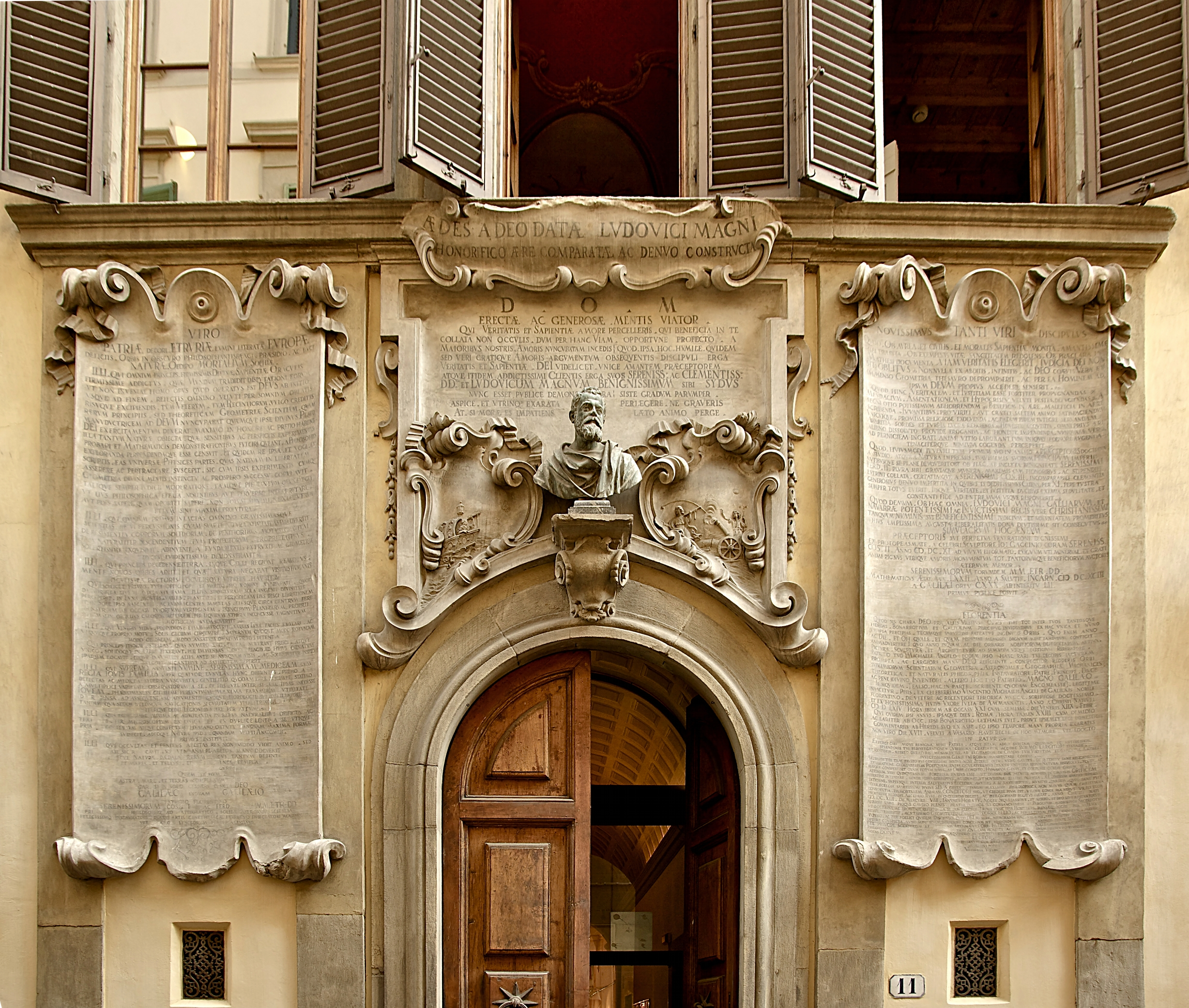
The facade, with its prominent inscriptions.

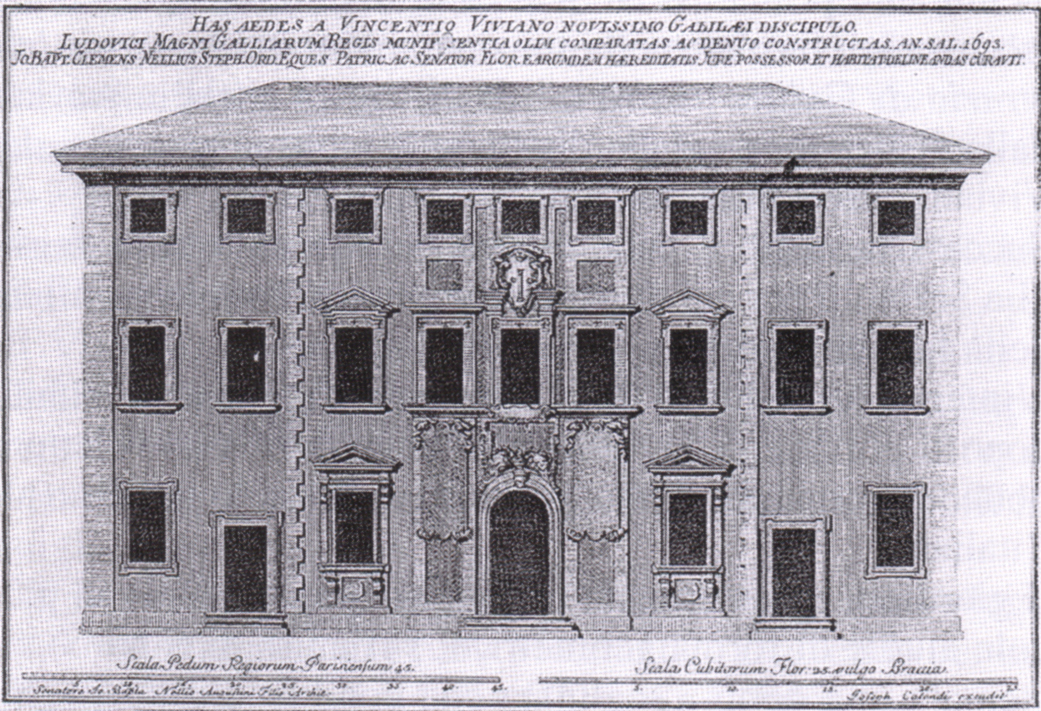
18th century drawing of the palace's facade.

Palazzo dei Cartelloni, also known as Palazzo Viviani, is a Baroque-style palace in Florence, region of Tuscany, Italy.

== History ==
This building displays many unusual architectural elements, the most evident being the unusually big epigraphs written in Latin. The owner of the building, the mathematician Vincenzo Viviani, had them applied on the main façade in 1693, in order to celebrate and glorify the life and many discoveries of his mentor, Galileo Galilei. It is after these inscriptions that the building takes its name.

The main architecture of the building was created by Giovanni Battista Nelli, while the bust of Galileo that still stands over the main entrance was sculpted by Giovanni Battista Foggini, and is actually a copy of the original made by Giovanni Caccini in 1610.

After Viviani died in 1703, the building was inherited by his nephew, the Abbot Paolo Panzanini. The palace was then acquired by Giovan Battista Nelli's son, who had the same name as his father. The new owner took good care of the many books and manuscripts which belonged to Viviani, and also published the façade's inscriptions in his work Galileo’s Life and Literary Commerce.

The palace was later owned by the Sermolli family (who then became the Picchi Sermolli family) and successively by the Loria family.

Today Palazzo dei Cartelloni is owned by SACI Studio Arts College International, a U.S. institution.

A small classical garden, which was recently restored, is located within the premises and includes a double staircase leading to an upper terrace.

The rooms inside the palace have been renovated several times throughout the centuries. Some of them have wonderful coffered ceilings, probably dating to the 19th century, as well as beautiful frescoes. These frescoes display typical themes of the time, such as romantic landscapes, grotesques and rustic scenes. On the first floor, a Trompe-l'œil fresco covers the entire room, giving the optical illusion of a pergola, with an olive tree in the distance.

== Sources ==
- Sandra Carlini, Lara Mercanti, Giovanni Straffi, I Palazzi parte seconda. Arte e storia degli edifici civili di Firenze, Alinea, Florence, 2004.
