= Seymour Van Gundy =

American professor (1931–2020)

Seymour Dean Van Gundy
- Born: February 24, 1931; Toledo, Ohio, U.S.
- Died: December 27, 2020 (aged 89)
- Education: B.A. in Biology, Bowling Green State University (1953): Ph.D., University of Wisconsin–Madison (1956)
- Title: Fellow, American Association for the Advancement of Science

Seymour Dean Van Gundy (February 24, 1931 – December 27, 2020) was an American professor emeritus of nematology at University of California, Riverside and former dean of the College of Agriculture and Natural Resources.

== Background ==
After graduating from Monclova High School in 1949, Van Gundy attended Bowling Green State University on an Edwin Mosley scholarship. While an undergraduate, Van Gundy worked part-time at an H.J. Heinz research facility. There he met J.C. Walker: a professor teaching at University of Wisconsin–Madison. Walker offered Van Gundy an assistantship to continue studying cucumbers after Van Gundy's graduation from Bowling Green State University. Van Gundy went to University of Wisconsin for graduate work, where he completed his Ph.D. in 1956 and his postdoctoral studies in February 1957. Van Gundy interviewed with Dewey J. Raski for a nematology position at University of California, Riverside (UCR); Van Gundy was hired by the co-located University of California Citrus Experiment Station as a junior nematologist in March 1957. In 1966 Van Gundy took a sabbatical from teaching to study Meloidogyne javanica and Tylenchulus semipenetrans in Australia with Harry Wallace and Alan Bird.

Van Gundy was promoted to full professor in July 1968. In 1969 during the height of the Vietnam War, Van Gundy defended the University's position refusing classified Department of Defense research projects, citing the restriction against publication counter to the interests of involved graduate and postdoctoral students. That same year Van Gundy founded the Journal of Nematology for the Society of Nematologists, becoming the journal's first editor-in-chief. Beginning in 1970 Van Gundy served as Assistant Vice Chancellor for Research until 1972 when he was recruited by the College of Agriculture and Natural Resources's dean, William Dugger, to chair the department of nematology. In 1978, Van Gundy was named a fellow of the American Phytopathological Society. Van Gundy continued to chair nematology at UCR until he took a sabbatical in 1984 to study rhizobacteria. That work resulted in Van Gundy being awarded a patent for Rhizobacterial plant protection.

Upon his return he was appointed Associate Dean of Research. Van Gundy was appointed interim dean of the College of Agriculture and Natural Resources in 1988 and became full dean in 1990. He retired in 1993. Even after retirement he continued to teach courses in growing blueberries and plumerias. Van Gundy was appointed by Governor Gray Davis to the Regional Water Quality Control Board for the Santa Ana region in 2000 and re-appointed by Davis's successor, Arnold Schwarzenegger in 2006. In 2006 Van Gundy was inducted by Moldova's National Academy of Sciences in thanks of his management of the extension program between UCR and Moldova State University.

== Selected publications ==
- Studies on the disease cycle of angular leaf spot of cucurbits (Thesis). University of Wisconsin-Madison. 1957. OCLC 52339668.
- Van Gundy, Seymour D. (1965). "Factors in Survival of Nematodes". Annual Review of Phytopathology. 3: 43–68. doi:10.1146/annurev.py.03.090165.000355.
