= Robert Archambeau =

Canadian ceramic artist and potter (1933–2022)

- Born: 18 April 1933; Toledo, Ohio, U.S.
- Died: 25 April 2022 (aged 89)
- Occupations: Ceramic artist, potter

Robert Archambeau (18 April 1933 – 25 April 2022) was a Canadian ceramic artist and potter. He also had an academic career in post-secondary art studies.

== Personal history ==
Born in Toledo, Ohio, United States, in 1933, he immigrated to Canada in 1968. He served four years in the U.S. Marines, before undergraduate Studies at Toledo University, the Toledo Museum of Art School and Bowling Green State University where he graduated with a Bachelor of Fine Arts. He earned his Masters of Fine Arts degree from New York State College of Ceramics on the campus of Alfred University in 1964. In addition to his prominence in the field of ceramic art, he was known as an educator and an art collector. These three facets of his career are chronicled in the exhibition catalogue Robert Archambeau: Artist, Teacher, Collector, with essays by Helen Delacretaz and Edward Lebow. His son, also named Robert Archambeau, is a poet and literary critic, whose works include the books Word Play Place, Home and Variations, and Laureates and Heretics.

== Body of work ==
His work, heavily influenced by Japanese ceramics, has been exhibited internationally. His works are held in many major public and private collections around the world. While living in Japan he worked closely with the artist Akio Takamori and in the studio of Jun Kaneko. He is particularly noted for his production of wood fired ceramics. He also worked closely with painter Don Reichert, who was a colleague at the University of Manitoba. Both artists operated studios in the remote Canadian town of Bissett, Manitoba.

== Academic career ==
He was professor emeritus of Art at the University of Manitoba, where he taught for 23 years, retiring in 1991. He also taught at the Rhode Island School of Design.

== Awards and prizes ==
In 2003, he became an artist laureate recipient of the Governor General's Award in Visual and Media Arts, Canada's highest artistic honor. In 2008, he was awarded a Lifetime Achievement Award at the annual NCECA conference held in Pittsburgh, Pennsylvania.

== Bibliography ==
- Delacretaz, Helen, and Edward Lebow (2004). Robert Archambeau: Artist, Teacher, Collector, exhibition catalogue, curated by Helen Delacretaz. Winnipeg: Winnipeg Art Gallery. ISBN 0-88915-225-X.
