= Paywall: The Business of Scholarship =

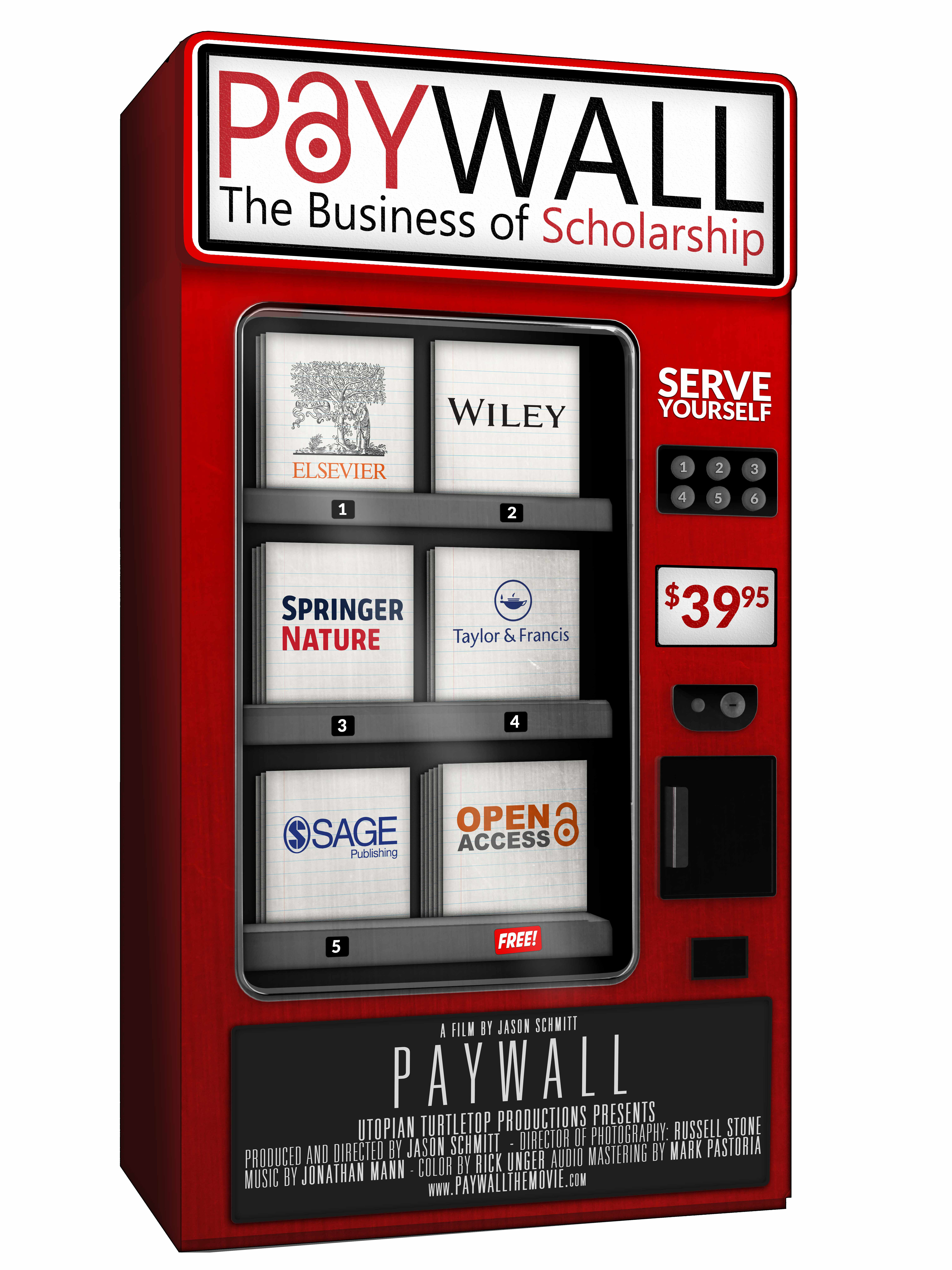
- Directed by: Jason Schmitt
- Produced by: Jason Schmitt
- Starring: Amy Brand, Leslie Chan, Paul Ginsparg, Paul Peters, Heather Joseph, Brian Nosek, Alexandra Elbakyan, Peter Suber, Vitek Tracz, John Wilbanks
- Cinematography: Russell Stone
- Music by: Jonathan Mann
- Release dates: September 5, 2018 (Landmark Theater, Washington DC)
- Running time: 65 minutes
- Country: United States
- Language: English

Paywall: The Business of Scholarship is a 2018 American documentary film directed by Jason Schmitt. It documents the high profits and business practices of the academic publishing industry and the efforts of the open access movement to reform it. The film premiered at the Landmark Theater (E-Street) in Washington, DC on September 5, 2018, and was subsequently freely released online under a Creative Commons license Attribution 4.0 in keeping with the spirit of the film.

The full documentary

== Reception ==
The documentary has received reviews in many outlets including Inside Higher Ed, Nature, New Scientist, Endeavour, and Research Features.

== Budget ==
To support the filmmaker and his team to create this film and release it online for free, it received funding support from a charitable grant from Open Society Foundations.
