= William Takacs =

William Joseph Takacs (born December 23, 1973) is the principal trumpet of the Amarillo Symphony Orchestra and trumpet instructor at West Texas A&M University.

== Early life and education ==
Takacs was born in Philadelphia, Pennsylvania. He received his Bachelor of Music degree from West Chester University in 1995, his Master of Music degree from Bowling Green State University, 1998, with the thesis An Examination of Gustav Mahler's Life and Fifth Symphony, with a Focus on the Trumpet Part, and his Doctorate of Music from Florida State University in 2003, with the dissertation Russian Trumpet Music – An Analysis of Concerti by Oskar Böhme, Eino Tamberg, and Sergeï Wassilenko.

== Awards ==
Takacs won the 1999 National Trumpet Competition at George Mason University in Washington D.C., and was one of five semifinalists in the 2000 Ellsworth Smith International Trumpet Competition held in Bad Säckingen, Germany, sponsored by the International Trumpet Guild.

== Performances and associations ==
He has made guest performance appearances with the Toledo, Ohio, Pensacola, and Tallahassee Symphony Orchestras and has performed across the United States, Europe, South America, Asia, and Australia. He performed as guest principal trumpet for the New Sigmund Romberg Orchestra's 1999 performance tour of Taiwan and the Orquesta Sinfónica de Trujillo (Peru). He has also appeared in various capacities at institutions including Western Michigan University, University of Wisconsin-River Falls, Valdosta State University, Stetson University, University of Central Florida, and the Conservatorio Regional de Música de Trujillo (Peru).

Takacs was associated with Iowa-based chamber ensemble Skyline Brass, circa 1999. He is an active member of the International Trumpet Guild and an Artist/Clinician for Edwards Trumpets.
