= Joseph D. Haske =

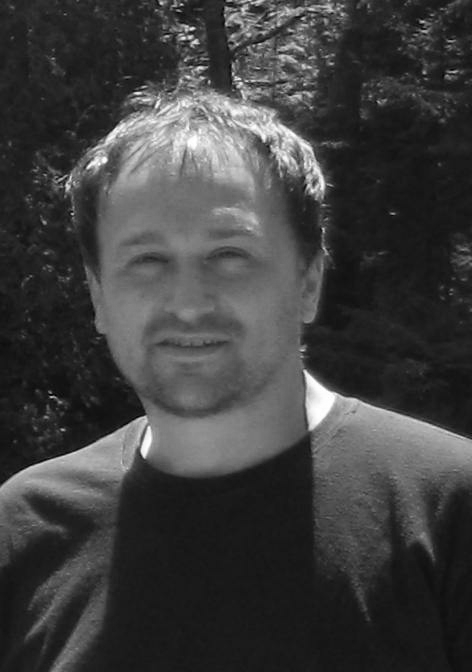
- Born: Joseph Daniel Haske; June 6, 1974 (age 51) Sault Ste. Marie, Michigan, U.S.
- Occupation: Writer
- Education: Cedarville High School; Lake Superior State University (BA); Bowling Green State University; University of Texas–Pan American (MFA)
- Spouse: Bertha
- Children: 2

Joseph Daniel Haske (born June 6, 1974 in Sault Saint Marie, Michigan) is an American writer, author of North Dixie Highway. He received the 2011 Boulevard Emerging Writers Award for short fiction.

== Early life and education ==
Haske was born and raised in Sault Ste. Marie in the Upper Peninsula of Michigan. He attended Cedarville High School in Cedarville, Michigan, followed by Lake Superior State University where he graduated in 1999 with a BA in English. Haske was fascinated by naturalist and modernist fiction, as well as Transcendentalist philosophy, which most reflected the way he saw himself in his natural environment. For a brief time, he joined the military and served in the infantry during the Clinton administration. When he returned, he completed his studies in English at Bowling Green State University.

== Career ==
Haske moved in 2003 to McAllen, TX, where he began teaching at South Texas College, and he was the Chair of the English Department there for a few years. He completed an MFA at University of Texas Rio Grande Valley (then University of Texas–Pan American) in Edinburg, Texas. There, he started working on his first novel, North Dixie Highway, a book about the troubled youth of Buck Metzger, a "Yooper" like himself, who seeks to avenge the death of his grandfather.

== Publications ==
Haske wrote for a number of publications, including The Texas Review, The Four-Way Review, Pleiades, Boulevard, Fiction International, Rampike, etc. His work has been translated into French and Romanian and has appeared in Canadian and Romanian publications. He edits for various journals, including Sleipnir and American Book Review.

=== Books ===
North Dixie Highway, (Oct 2013, Texas Review Press). This novel goes back and forth in time to show moments from the life of Buck Metzger and his colorful family: his intimidating grandfather, his intelligent grandmother, his rough uncle, his high class girlfriend, in a story of devotion, idealism, violence and tribal revenge.

== Personal life ==
He is married to Bertha, and has two children, Ferny and Joey.
