= Kathia Rodriguez =

American actress

- Born: Kathia J. Rodriguez Rosario; Barceloneta, Puerto Rico
- Years active: 2016—present

Kathia J. Rodriguez Rosario is an actress with a key role in Miguel Coyula's latest film Memorias del Desarrollo.

She was raised by her mother and grandmother, Myrna Rosario and Nilda Galarza. Kathia has a Master's in Biology from University of Puerto Rico at Mayagüez. She is married to Harry Santiago-Perez, CPA and both have lived in Philadelphia, Pennsylvania, since 2004.

== Biography ==
Rodriguez was born in Barceloneta, Puerto Rico, and attended high school there. Since childhood, she has been involved in the arts. She attended the modeling agency, Refine, and was a member of a talent show company that performed shows throughout the island. She has won awards for her impersonations of Madonna and Cuban singer, Lissette. However, her family stressed the importance of a college education.

After graduation, Rodriguez decided to enroll at the University of Puerto Rico at Mayagüez to pursue a degree in biology. Her goal was to attend medical school and become a cardiologist. However, her dream and passion was to be an actress. She then combined her studies in biology with elective classes in the school's theater department.

During her senior year, Rodriguez married her best friend, Harry Santiago-Perez. The following year, she began her master's degree in microbiology. In 2003, her thesis, titled Eficacia del hongo Pleurotus ostreatus como biorremediador de suelos contaminados con metales pesados was published.

Later that year, Rodriguez joined her husband in Bowling Green, Ohio, where he was a student in the Master in Accountancy Program at Bowling Green State University. After his graduation in 2004, they moved to Philadelphia, Pennsylvania. Then, she started to work at Charles Rivers Laboratories, located in Malvern, Pennsylvania,. and she combined her biology career with her dream of being an actress. She joined The Actor's Training Studio, which is directed by Nick Dana. She found the time to film commercials.

Since 2006, Rodriguez has been a full-time actress. She was cast as Alba in the film Memorias del Desarrollo. She travels weekly to New York City to audition for TV commercials, short films, TV programs, and movies. She joined Mitchell/Rudolph Casting class to maintain herself up to date in the acting business. On August 8, 2007, Kathia signed with MMG (Model Management Group) in New York City.

== Appearances ==
=== Selected filmography ===
Year	Title	Role
2007	Memorias del Desarrollo	Alba
2006	La Casa Loca	Woman with speaking part

=== Theater ===
Year	Title	Role	Note
2007	An Ideal Husband	Mrs. Marchmont / Countess of Basildon	Old Academy Theater, Philadelphia

=== TV commercials ===
Year	Title	Role	Note
2006	Blue Hippo	Phone Operator	Spanish Version

== See also ==
- List of Puerto Ricans
