= Theresa Williams =

American novelist

Theresa Williams (born 1956) is a contemporary fiction writer whose works include The Secret of Hurricanes: A Novel (MacAdam/Cage 2002) and short stories in such magazines and journals as The Sun, The Chattahoochee Review, and Hunger Mountain. She is the recipient of an Individual Excellence Award from the Ohio Arts Council and her novel, The Secret of Hurricanes was a finalist for the Paterson Fiction Prize. She teaches literature and creative writing at Bowling Green State University in Ohio.
