= Deborah Thigpen =

American entrepreneur

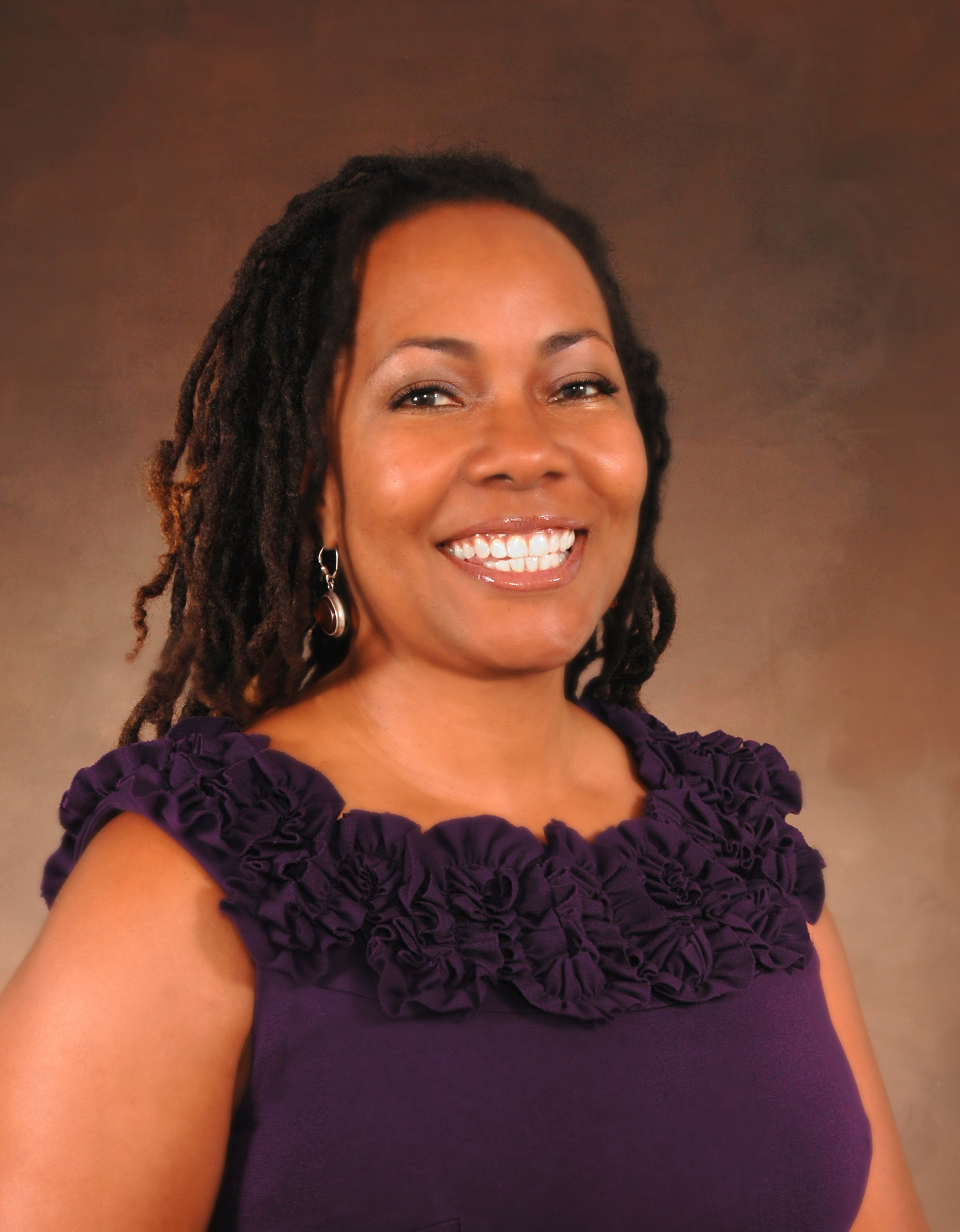
Deborah Thigpen

Dr. Deborah Thigpen (born Cleveland, Ohio) is an American entrepreneur. Her career began as a publicist with Denver-based Up With People, Inc. (UWP) an international theatrical touring company. As publicist with UWP, she handled media relations in 39 states, Puerto Rico, Venezuela and London. Her connection with the music industry continued as a publicist for Boston, Los Angeles based Alan Haymon Productions, promotions director of KQXL radio in Baton Rouge, LA., and promotions assistant at WBUR, National Public Radio in Boston, MA.

== Education ==
She received her BS in journalism in 1978 from Bowling Green State University. She earned her MA in management (2005) and D.M. (2011) from the University of Phoenix. Her doctorate dissertation was Factors influencing the success of African American women small business owner.

Thigpen also received executive training at the Amos Tuck School of Business at Dartmouth College, Boston University and Kent State University.

== Career ==
She started Thigpen & Associates, Inc., a public relations and marketing communications firm, in 1988, changing the name to Thigpen & Associates Public Relations in 2006. She has consulted for EPA, Goodyear, Harris County Flood Control District, NASA, Ohio Lottery, the Cleveland Cavaliers.

In 1996 she was inducted into the Corporate Leaders Hall of Fame by the Ohio Assembly of Councils. In 1997 she was named the National Minority Small Business Person of the year by the U.S. Small Business Administration.

== Personal life ==
Thigpen is a diamond life member of Delta Sigma Theta sorority. Thigpen also served as an adjunct professor at Texas Southern University and sports information director at Prairie View A&M University.
