= J. Bruce Overmier =

American experimental psychologist, author, and academic

- Occupations: Experimental psychologist, author and academic

Academic background
- Education: A.B. Chemistry; M.A. Psychology: General; M.A. Psychology: Learning; Ph.D. Psychology: Learning
- Alma mater: Kenyon College; Bowling Green University; University of Pennsylvania
- Thesis: Auditory pattern preference as a function of informational content (1962)

Academic work
- Institutions: University of Minnesota (UMN)
- Website: https://sites.google.com/view/jbruceovermier/home

J. Bruce Overmier is an American experimental psychologist, author, and academic. He is Professor Emeritus in the Department of Psychology at the University of Minnesota (UMN).

Overmier's research is centered on behavioral and biological psychology, with a specific focus on using basic animal research as models to provide fundamental insights into both mental and physical health. He has published journal articles, book chapters, and reference CDs. He is also the author of two books, titled Animal Learning: Survey and Analysis and Animal Models of Human Pathology: A Bibliography of a Quarter Century of Behavioral Research, and the editor of Animal Research and Human Health: Advancing Human Welfare Through Behavioral Science, among others. He is the recipient of the D.O. Hebb Distinguished Scientific Contributions Award, the American Psychological Association inaugural Award for Distinguished Service to Psychological Science, the American Psychological Association Board of Educational Affairs Outstanding Graduate Teaching of Psychology as a Core STEM Discipline Award, the C.T. Morgan Award for Distinguished Service, the Susan T. Rydell Lifetime Achievement Award, and the W. Horsley Gantt Medal. In addition, he won the Ernest R. Hilgard Lifetime Achievement Award and wrote an invited column titled "Reflections on 60 years of working in psychology" in The General Psychologist newsletter, where he reflected on his career and shared nine lessons learned during that time.

Overmier is a Fellow of the Association for Psychological Science, and American Psychological Association, as well as an Elected Fellow of the Society of Experimental Psychologists. He is also a member of the International Association of Applied Psychology and the International Society for Comparative Psychology. He has served as the editor of Learning and Motivation and as an associate editor for American Psychologist, Encyclopedia of Psychology, and International Journal of Psychology.

== Education and early career ==
Overmier pursued a Bachelor of Arts degree in chemistry at Kenyon College, followed by a master's degree in general psychology from Bowling Green University. In 1962, he took the Perception and Choice Behavior fellowship at the University of Pennsylvania, and from 1963 to 1965, he held the NIH Predoctoral Fellowship. He earned a master's degree in learning psychology in 1964 and completed his doctoral studies in psychology at UPenn in 1965. He served his postdoctoral term at the University of London in 1971 and received the National Science Foundation senior postdoctoral fellowship as well as a Fulbright Hays Fellowship for lecturing at the International Laboratory of Brain Research in 1980. In 1984, he was awarded the Fogarty Senior International Fellowship at the Institute of Physiological Psychology, followed by the Bush Foundation Sabbatical Fellowship, the James McKeen Cattell Fellowship in 1985, and Norwegian Marshall Fund Fellow in 1987. He was honored with the Dr. Sci. honoris causa in 1990 by Kenyon College and received honorary degrees from University of Montreal and University of Bergen in 2008.

=== Academic genealogy ===
Overmier's academic journey has been influenced by a lineage of mentors. Initially, figures like Harry Harlow, J. McV. Hunt, Harold Schlosberg, and Donald R. Meyer played a role in shaping his scholarly development. He also received mentorship from a group of nine individuals, including Seymour Levine, Robt Guion, John R. Schuck, Richard L. Solomon, J. Brady, Holger Ursin, F. R. Brush, E. Schein, and Jerzy Konorski.

== Career ==
After initially training as a chemist at Kenyon College in 1960, Overmier switched to psychology. His academic career began as an assistant professor at the University of Minnesota from 1965 to 1968, followed by roles as associate professor and then professor within the Department of Psychology from 1971 to 2014. He held the position of professor II at the University of Bergen from 1992 to 2006 and served as an adjunct professor at the University of Tehran. He was appointed the John Paul Scott Distinguished Lecturer at Bowling Green State University in 2015 and is serving as a professor emeritus at UMN.

Overmier served as the director of the Center for Research in Learning, Perception, & Cognition at the University of Minnesota from 1983 to 1989. He then held the position of Executive Officer for the Department of Psychology and acted as the Principal Investigator for the Research Experiences for Undergraduates in the Behavioral Sciences program from 1989 to 2002.

Overmier co-founded the Winter Conference on Animal Learning in 1981 and served as a president of the Midwestern Psychological Association in 1987. Within the APA, he assumed the presidency of the Society for Behavioral Neuroscience and Comparative Psychology in 1990, later serving as President of the Society for Experimental Psychology and Cognitive Science in 1992 as well as Society for General Psychology in 2003. He held the role of President of the Pavlovian Society from 1995. He also served as the President of the International Union of Psychological Sciences from 2004 to 2008. He was elected to the executive board of the International Council of Science (ICSU) from 2009 to 2011.

== Research ==
Overmier's research activities have encompassed diverse areas such as learning, memory, stress, and the underlying biological substrates. His work involved a wide array of animal models and human clients with specific dysfunctions to explore cognitive and biological aspects of stress, conditioning, learning, and memory in both animals and humans.

== Works ==
In his co-authored book Animal Learning Survey and Analysis, Overmier discussed the challenges associated with employing anesthetized or immobilized animals, which impede the examination of intricate behaviors within the mammalian nervous system. Robert Boice in a review for The Quarterly Review of Biology described the book as an excellent textbook conveying the author's enthusiasm for animal behavior and sociobiology principles.

Overmier and F. Robert Brush edited Affect, Conditioning, and Cognition: Essays on the Determinants of Behavior which encompassed Solomon's teaching and research covering conditioned fear, cognitive aspects in Pavlovian conditioning, and learned helplessness. In the compilation Animal Models of Human Pathology: A Bibliography of a Quarter Century of Behavioral Research, he, in collaboration with Patricia D. Burke, edited 25 years of research on animal behavior models which featured 1600 abstracts and citations from the PsycINFO database. He contributed as an editor to the IAAP Handbook of Applied Psychology as well, which offered an overview of applied psychology and key research findings.

Co-edited with Marilyn E. Carroll, Overmier's work Animal Research and Human Health: Advancing Human Welfare through Behavioral Science explored the synergistic relationship between human and animal research, showcasing breakthroughs in diverse psychology domains. In a review for the Quarterly Journal of Experimental Psychology, Trevor Robbins stated that "J. Bruce Overmier has previously provided one of the more precise accounts of the status of the animal model concept which is developed further here to point out its general heuristic utility in abstract problem-solving endeavors of representation in parallel domains."

=== Animal models ===
Overmier has conducted various studies on animal models and physiological impacts in animals. He explored the consequences of exposing dogs to inescapable shocks, observing a reliable disruption of their subsequent escape-avoidance responses in new situations suggesting that these disruptive effects constituted a state of Learned Helplessness. He expanded on this research, by conducting an investigation involving 18 male dogs subjected to three treatments: hammock habituation, stress induction, and a shuttlebox test. The results revealed that exposure to uncontrollable shocks during stress induction led to a significant increase in cortisol levels. In a 1991 study focused on stress-induced gastric ulcers in animal models, he highlighted the notion that some of these ulcers are primarily driven by brain-related mechanisms suggesting that managing such ulcers can be achieved through central interventions.

=== Behavioral psychology and pharmacology ===
Overmier's research has provided insights into psychological conditions and the pharmacological impact on behavior. He delved into the two-process approach to learning, with a specific focus on Pavlovian mediational states resulting from stimulus-reinforcer pairings as modulators of instrumental behaviors. He explored the concepts of learned helplessness and learned irrelevance, to shed light on their relevance in understanding conditions such as depression and PTSD underscoring the value of this research and raising concerns about emerging social and legal barriers within this field. His research extended to investigating the specificity of Pavlovian conditioned stimuli (CSs) through experiments revealing that CS+s significantly influence choices related to their associated specific reinforcers.

== Awards and honors ==
- 2000 – C. T. Morgan Award for Distinguished Service
- 2003 – W. Horsely Gantt Medal for Research, Pavlovian Society
- 2004 – Susan T. Rydell Lifetime Achievement Award
- 2009 – American Psychological Foundation's Arthur W. Staats Award for Unification of Psychology
- 2012 – C. Alan Boneau Award, Society for General Psychology
- 2014 – Board of Educational Affairs Outstanding Graduate Teaching of Psychology as a Core STEM Discipline Award, American Psychological Association
- 2015 – The D.O. Hebb Distinguished Scientific Contributions Award, Society for Behavioral Neuroscience and Comparative Psychology
- 2021 – Ernest R. Hilgard Lifetime Achievement Award, Society for General Psychology

== Bibliography ==
=== Books ===
- Animal Learning: Survey and Analysis (1979) ISBN 978-0306400612
- Animal Models of Human Pathology: A Bibliography of a Quarter Century of Behavioral Research (1992) ISBN 978-1557981844
- Animal Research and Human Health: Advancing Human Welfare Through Behavioral Science (2001) ISBN 978-1557987884
- IAAP Handbook of Applied Psychology (2011) ISBN 978-1405193313
- Affect, Conditioning, and Cognition: Essays on the Determinants of Behavior (2014) ISBN 978-1138823105

=== Selected articles ===
- Overmier, J. B., & Seligman, M. E. (1967). Effects of inescapable shock upon subsequent escape and avoidance responding [Learned Helplessness]. Journal of comparative and physiological psychology, 63, 28–33.
- Overmier, J.B., Bull, J.A., & Trapold, M.A. (1971). Discriminative cue properties of different fears and their role in response selection. Journal of Comparative and Physiological Psychology, 76, 478–482
- Ehrman, R. N., & Overmier, J. B. (1976). Dissimilarity of the mechanisms for the evocation of escape and avoidance responding. Animal Learning and Behavior, 4, 347‑351.
- Dess, N. K., Linwick, D., Patterson, J., Overmier, J. B., & Levine, S. (1983). Immediate and proactive effects of controllability and predictability on plasma cortisol responses to shocks in dogs. Behavioral Neuroscience, 97(6), 1005–1016.
- Overmier, J. B., & Wielkiewicz, R. M. (1983). On unpredictability as a causal factor in "Learned Helplessness." Learning and Motivation, 14, 324‑337
- Linwick, D., Overmier, J.B., Peterson, G.B., & Mertens, M. (1988). The interactions of memories and expectancies as mediators at choice behavior. American Journal of Psychology, 101, 313‑334.
- Maki-Kahn, P., Overmier, J. B., Delos. S., Gutmann, A. (1995). Expectancies as factors influencing conditional discrimination performance of children. Psychological Record, 45, 1–27
- Mok, L.W., Thomas, K.M., Lungu, O.V., & Overmier, J.B. (2009). Neural correlates of cue-unique outcome expectations under differential outcomes training: An fMRI study. Brain Research, 1265, 111–127
- Browning, R., Overmier, J.B., & Colombo, M. (2011). Delay activity in avian prefrontal cortex: Sample code or reward code? European Journal of Neuroscience, 33, 726–735
- Overmier, J.B., & Murison, R, (2013). Restoring psychology's role in peptic ulcer. Applied Psychology: Health and Well-Being, 5(1), 5-27.
