= Judith Craven =

Medical professional

Judith B. Craven (born 1946) is a medical professional with a degree from Bowling Green State University. She is also involved in business, specifically as a board member of Luby's and as an Independent director of Sysco.
