= Brad Hurtado =

Brad Hurtado (born February 28, 1961, in Toledo, Ohio) is a freelance television and live-event producer, currently living and working in New York City.

During his senior year at Bowling Green State University Hurtado began working as the producer of a live morning talk show at the ABC affiliate in his hometown of Toledo. He then worked as a producer on Detroit's morning talk show Kelly and Company for 10 years throughout the 1980s. He moved to New York as a producer on The Maury Povich Show. He later became a producer on the Phil Donahue Show for the final four years of the show's 29-year run ending in 1994.

Hurtado was the executive producer of New York's Metro Guide Channel, the senior producer of Fox News Channel's WebMD TV, and an executive producer of various shows for the Food Network, including, How To Boil Water & Ready! Set! Cook! He produced for five seasons of Celebrity Poker Showdown on Bravo, developed a music series called Hollywood & Vinyl for VH1, produced for The Martha Stewart Show, The Bea Smith Show, and Charlie Rose.

Brad executive-produced the New York GLAAD Media Awards for five years in the late 1990s. Since the early 2000s, he has produced Billboard Magazine's Latin Music, Hip Hop and Touring Awards, as well as the CLIO Awards in 2009 and 2010 recognizing excellence in international advertising.

Since 2002, Brad has been a producer of Sand Blast Weekend , the annual gay and lesbian beach party weekend in Asbury Park, New Jersey that draws over 4,000 guests from the New York – Philly – DC / New Jersey area.

In 2010 and 2011, Brad produced the LOGO network docu-soap THE A LIST-NEW YORK and the spin-off, THE A LIST-DALLAS. In 2012 he produced the top-rated BRAVO series "The Real Housewives of Atlanta", as well as 'The Dukes of Melrose" for BRAVO and "Too Cute!" for Animal Planet.

Hurtado has been in a relationship with Australian-born actor Sean Martin Hingston since 1994. In 2000 they adopted a daughter, Grace, born in San Antonio, Texas. The two played a couple named "David and David" in "Was It Good For You?", an episode in season 2 of the television series "Sex and the City".
