= Gary Keck =

American chemist

Gary E. Keck
- Citizenship: American
- Education: Bowling Green State University, University of Wisconsin–Madison, Harvard University
- Known for: Keck asymmetric allylation
- Awards: Alfred Sloan Fellow
- Scientific career
- Fields: Organic Chemistry
- Workplaces: University of Utah

Gary E. Keck is an American chemist.

== Biography ==
=== Education ===
Gary Keck received a BS from Bowling Green State University in 1971, a PhD from the University of Wisconsin Madison in 1975 (studying with Howard E. Zimmerman) and was a postdoctoral with E. J. Corey at Harvard University from 1975-1977.

=== Career ===
Keck spent his academic career in the department of chemistry at the University of Utah. His research group pioneered the use of transient acylnitroso compounds for alkaloid synthesis, macrolactonization methods, and the use of allylic stannanes for the stereocontrolled synthesis of polyketide chains. Throughout his career, he pursued the total synthesis of complex natural products, culminating in his work on bryostatins. Keck named several compounds after Merle Haggard. Gary Keck was a Fellow of the Alfred P. Sloan Foundation, was named an Arthur C. Cope Scholar of the American Chemical Society in 2014, and was made a distinguished professor at University of Utah in 2014.
