= Joan Kaderavek =

American Speech-Language Pathologist

Joan Nybell Kaderavek is an American Speech-Language Pathologist, currently a retired Distinguished Professor at University of Toledo. She has published the book "Language Disorders in Children: Fundamental Concepts of Assessment and Intervention."
