= Don Reichert =

Canadian artist (1932–2013)

Don Reichert RCA
- Born: Don Karl Reichert; January 11, 1932; Libau, Manitoba, Canada
- Died: September 8, 2013 (aged 81)
- Known for: Painter, photographer, digital media artist
- Website: https://donreichert.ca

Don Karl Reichert RCA (11 January 1932 – 8 September 2013) was a Canadian artist. While primarily a painter in the abstract expressionist tradition, he was also notable for his work as a photographer and in digital media.

== Career ==
Donald Reichert was born in Libau, Manitoba in 1932 to parents who had immigrated from Austria. He studied art in Canada, Mexico, and England and then from 1964 taught at the University of Manitoba. As a young man, he was praised by the critic Clement Greenberg on a visit in 1963 who said he had the most possibilities of the artists Greenberg had seen in Winnipeg.

Reichert's early work often combined the elegant brush-strokes of abstract expressionist painting with the techniques of color field composition. Other significant strands of his work, center on black-and-white paintings resembling Asian calligraphy, or on the use of Latin American imagery, particularly pre-contact Mayan skull motifs derived from various Latin American ruins. He was perhaps best known, though, for large canvases painted out of doors. While abstract, these are reflective of the landscapes around him such as the forests and lakes of the Canadian Shield. His technique was unusual: canvasses are laid on the uneven ground, and the impression of the earth beneath is subtly incorporated into the work.

His multimedia works included photographs that had been painted over, often with elegant splattering or dripping in the style of Jackson Pollock. He also created works that incorporate photographs into paintings. As Reichert was an accomplished pilot, many of these were aerial photographs: a continuation of his ongoing interest in landscape.

He worked closely with internationally acclaimed ceramic artist Robert Archambeau, both of whom operated studios in the remote Canadian town of Bissett, Manitoba.

Reichert had a retrospective at the Winnipeg Art Gallery in 1992. He was a founding member and affiliated with the arts magazine Border Crossings. In 2013 Reichert was made a member of the Royal Canadian Academy of Arts.

== Selected public collections ==
Reichert produced work which is in many notable collections, including the National Gallery of Canada, the Art Gallery of Ontario, the Montreal Museum of Fine Art, the Winnipeg Art Gallery and the Canada Council Art Bank.

== See also ==
- Aerial photography
- Aerial landscape art
