= Keck asymmetric allylation =

In organic chemistry, the Keck asymmetric allylation is a chemical reaction that involves the nucleophilic addition of an allyl group to an aldehyde. The catalyst is a chiral complex that contains titanium as a Lewis acid. The chirality of the catalyst induces a stereoselective addition, so the secondary alcohol of the product has a predictable absolute stereochemistry based on the choice of catalyst. This name reaction is named for Gary Keck.

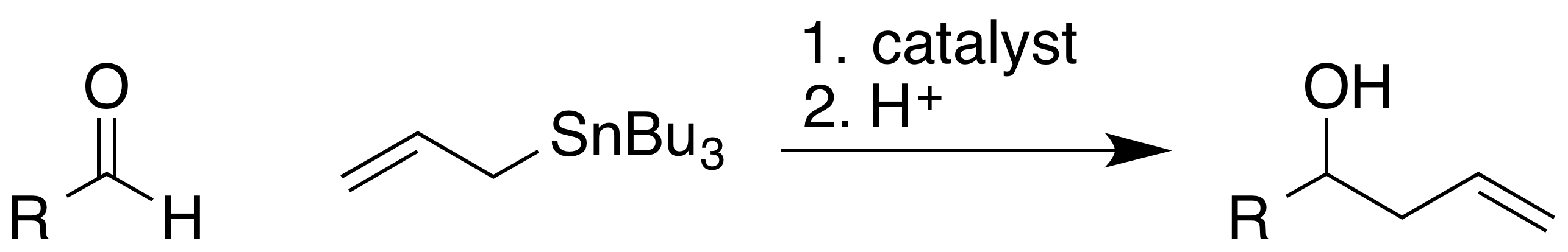

== Background ==
Isomers of BINOL

The Keck asymmetric allylation has many applications to the synthesis of natural products, including (−)-Gloeosporone, Epothilone A, the CD-Subunit of spongistatins, and the C10-C20 Subunit of rhizoxin A, The Keck allylation has also been utilized to form substituted tetrahydropyrans enantioselectively, moieties found in products such as phorboxazole and bryostatin 1.

Although the groups of E. Tagliavini and K. Mikami reported the catalysis of this reaction using a Ti(IV)–BINOL complex in the same year as the Keck group, Keck's publication reported higher enantio- and diastereoselectivity, and did not require the use of 4 Angstrom molecular sieves as in Mikami's procedure or an excess of BINOL as in Tagliavini's procedure.

Keck's early success with stereoselectivity and the simplicity of the catalyst preparation led to many improvements in reaction design, including development of other structural analogs of BINOL, use of stoichiometric additives to enhance the reaction rate, and broadening the scope of the reaction to include substituted stannane nucleophiles.

== Mechanism ==
The mechanism of this allylation is not fully known, although a cycle involving activation of the aldehyde by the bidentate BINOL-Ti complex followed by the addition of the allyl ligand to the aldehyde, removal of the tributyltin, and transmetallation to regenerate the Ti complex has been proposed.

Mechanism of Keck allylation

Work performed by Keck and followed up by Faller and coworkers showed a positive nonlinear effect (NLE) correlating the product enantiomeric purity with the BINOL enantiomeric purity. These observations imply that a dimeric meso-chiral catalyst is less active than the homochiral dimers, leading to the observed chiral amplification.

Corey's stereochemical model of catalyst binding

Corey and coworkers established a CH-O hydrogen bonding model that accounts for the absolute stereochemistry of the transformation.

== Improvements ==
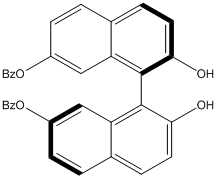
Tagliavini's benzyl derived BINOL ligand

The Tagliavini group, which had carried out asymmetric allylation using a similar BINOL-Ti(IV) complex, followed up early successes by synthesizing a variety of enantiopure substituted binaphthyl ligands. The most successful of these substituted binaphthyls, shown below, gave 92% product enantiomeric excess in the addition of allyltributyltin to aldehydes with a Ti(OiPr)2Cl2 metal complex.

The Brenna group developed a synthesis for a BINOL analog which can be resolved into its enantiomers quite easily and used as a chiral auxiliary for stereoselective Keck allylations, showing in some cases improved enantiomeric excesses of up to 4% over the (R)-BINOL catalyzed allylations. Additionally, the developed auxiliary also showed an NLE similar to the classic BINOL, allowing enantio-impure quantities to be used.

Brenna's BINOL derivative

Faller's group, whose aforementioned work helped elucidate the chiral amplification of the reaction, also developed the use of diisopropyl tartrate in a chiral poisoning strategy. Diisopropyl tartrate, racemic BINOL, Ti(OiPr)4, phenylaldehyde, and allyltributyltin were used to give enantiomeric excesses of up to 91%.

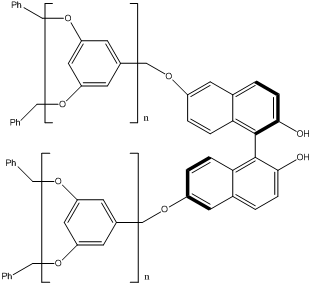
Polymer derived from BINOL

Yoshida and coworkers developed a synthesis of dendritic binaphthols that serve as homogenous, easily recoverable catalyst systems, and showed that they were amenable to forming homoallylic alcohols using Keck's allylation conditions.

Maruoka and Kii developed a bidentate Ti(IV) binol ligand for the allylation of aldehydes with the aim of restricting M-O bond rotation between the lewis acid and the aldehyde in order to improve enantiomeric excesses. The bidentate ligand contains two titaniums, binols, and an aromatic diamine connecting moiety, gave enantiomeric excesses of up to 99%. Improved stereoselectivity is proposed to come from double activation of the carbonyl from the titaniums, a hypothesis supported by C13 NMR and IR spectroscopy studies on 2,6-γ-pyrone substrate. The most convincing evidence that the M-O rotation is restricted comes from NOE NMR studies on trans-4-methoxy-3-buten-2-one. Radiation of methoxyvinyl protons in free enone and in enone complexed with monodentate Ti(IV) show s-cis and s-trans conformations, while radiation of the enone in a bidentate Ti(IV) complex showed predominantly s-trans conformers. In 2003, this group extended the allylation strategy using this bidentate catalyst to ketones.

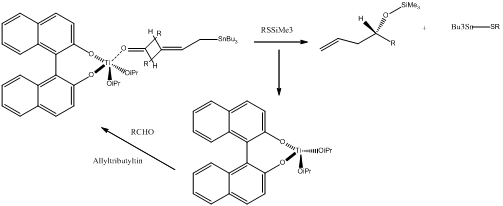
Thiol involved reaction scheme

Two key steps in the allylation reaction involve breakage of the Sn-C bond in the allyl fragment and formation of the O-Sn bond to facilitate reproduction of the Ti(IV) catalyst. Chan Mo-Yu and coworkers developed an alkylthiosilane accelerator to promote both of these steps, simultaneously increasing the reaction rate and lowering the required catalyst dosages. Coupling of phenylaldehyde with allyltributyltin afforded 91% yield and 97% enantiomeric excess of homoallylic alcohol using 10 mol% of the BINOL-Ti(IV) catalyst, however addition of the alkylthiosilane and use of only 5 mol% catalyst gave 80% yield and 95% enantiomeric excess of homoallylic alcohol.

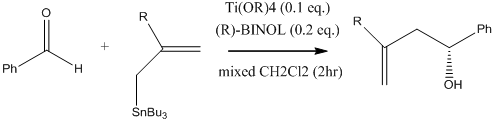
Reaction scheme of substituted Keck allylation

Brueckner and Weigand extended the use of this allylation chemistry to beta-substituted stannanes, including those that contain heterocycles, in 1996, exploring a variety of titanium alkoxides, premixing times, and reaction temperatures. The optimal discovered conditions were 10 mol% Ti(OiPr)4 or Ti(OEt)4, 20 mol% enantiopure BINOL, with a premixing period of 2 hours, giving enantiomeric excesses of up to 99%.
