= Charlie Reeve =

American psychologist and cognitive scientist

Charlie L. Reeve
- Education: University of Minnesota-Twin Cities (B.A., 1997); Bowling Green State University (M.A., 1998; Ph.D., 2001)
- Known for: Psychometrics
- Scientific career
- Fields: Psychology
- Institutions: University of North Carolina at Charlotte
- Thesis: Using latent variable analysis to explore the contribution of general and specific abilities in academic achievement: Is there more than g? (2001)
- Doctoral advisor: Milton D. Hakel

Charlie Lucian Reeve is a professor of psychology in the University of North Carolina at Charlotte's Ph.D. program in health psychology, where he is also an affiliate of the Cognitive Science Academy.
