= Jason Schmitt =

American blogger (born 1976)

- Born: Jason M. Schmitt; December 7, 1976 (age 48); Dearborn, Michigan, U.S.
- Education: University of Michigan–Dearborn (BA); Eastern Michigan University (MA); Bowling Green State University (PhD)
- Occupations: Journalist; documentary producer
- Website: jasonschmitt.com

Jason M. Schmitt (born December 7, 1976) is an American journalist, documentary producer, and professor and Dean of the College of Arts and Human Sciences at the University of Wisconsin–Stout. He is a regular contributor to Forbes and The Huffington Post in the fields of higher education and new technology. Schmitt has interviewed an extensive list of celebrities, politicians, and business leaders such as: Slash, Kid Rock, Roger Daltrey, Wayne Kramer, Dan Gilbert, Alfred Taubman, Geoffrey Fieger, Ted Nugent, Lemmy, Alice Cooper, John Sinclair, and Henry Rollins.

Schmitt researches how online education is changing global education, open access, and new technology trends. His research has been presented at Massachusetts Institute of Technology, the American University of Paris, and the University of St. Andrews.

Schmitt was interviewer and field producer for the documentary Louder Than Love by producer Tony D'Annunzio which is focused on The Grande Ballroom, in Detroit, Michigan. The documentary won an Emmy Award in June 2016.

Schmitt created a Michigan college student oriented website: MiGovernor.com which was focused on the 2010 Gubernatorial elections in Michigan. The site had over 30 feature articles submitted by prominent Detroit professionals and had over 3000 unique college users access the site.

Schmitt created Venison for Vitality a nonprofit organization which focuses on re-utilizing venison that is killed in traffic accidents. Working with the South Eastern Michigan Police Chiefs Association the non profit receives calls from local police stations, dispatches a driver to the carcass, video tapes and assess the damage of the carcass, and upon a clear initial documentation, the driver transports the venison to an approved butcher. The venison is then donated to local Detroit food pantries to help feed the less fortunate.

Schmitt teaches regularly on social media and online journalism.

Schmitt presented at Future Midwest 2011 and was regularly covers trends and changes in the music industry at conferences such as Rethink Music Conference by the Berklee College of Music and Harvard Business School.

Schmitt was born in Dearborn, Michigan, and attended the University of Michigan-Dearborn (BA), Eastern Michigan University (MA) and Bowling Green State University (Ph.D.).

Schmitt has been employed at Atlantic Records, Warner/Elektra/Atlantic Records, and he operated an independent recording studio.

Schmitt was an associate professor and director of communication studies and co-director of documentary studies at Green Mountain College in Poultney, Vermont, from 2012 to 2016. He was Associate Professor of Communication & Media and served as Interim Dean for the School of Arts & Sciences, associate dean of Strategic Development and Recruitment, and chair of the department of communication, media and design at Clarkson University from 2016 to 2024.

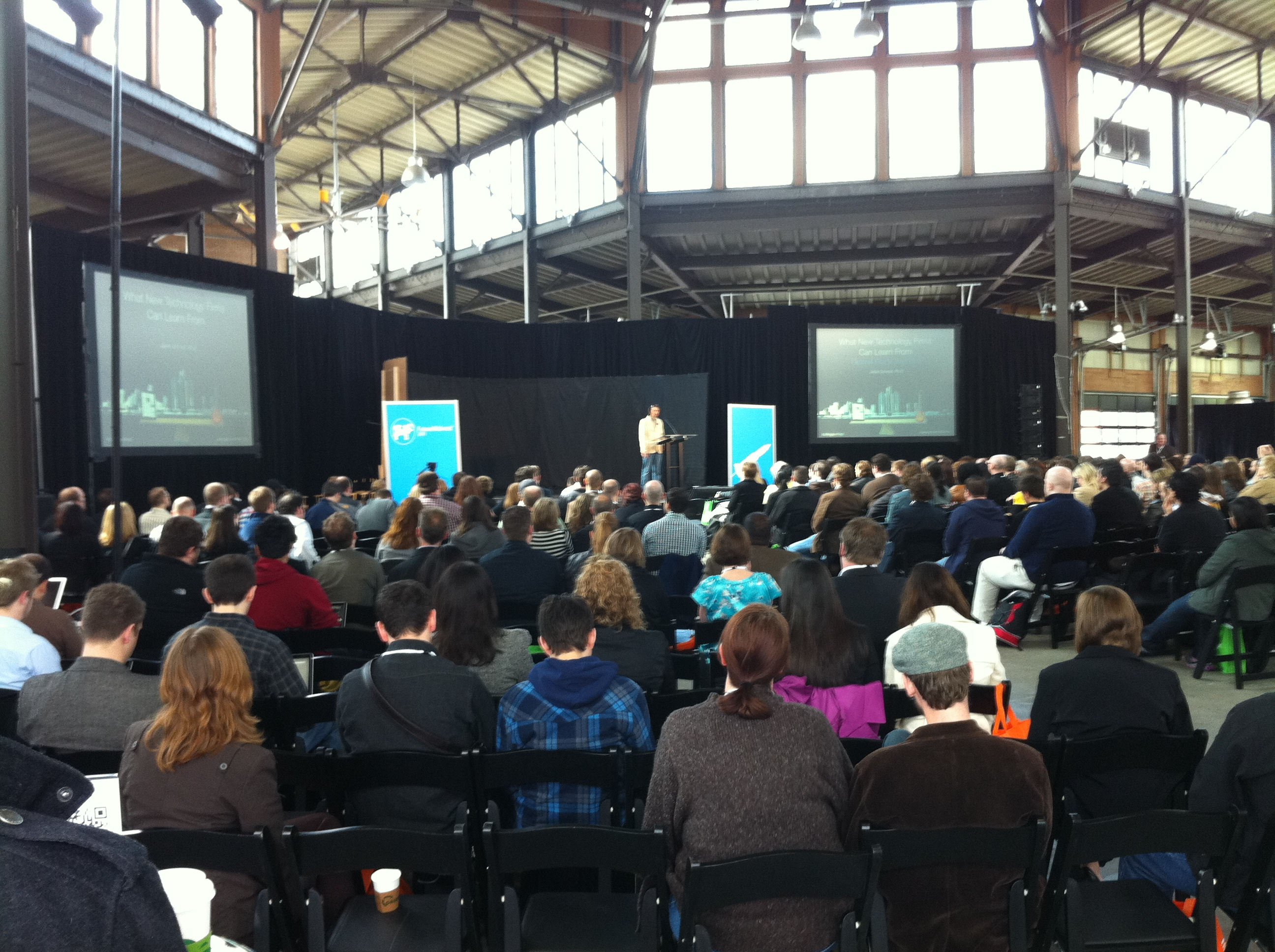

== Filmography as Director ==
- Paywall: The Business of Scholarship (2018)
