= Paul Chongkun Hong =

American Professor

Paul Chongkung Hong
- Born: February 15, 1964 (age 62); Korea

Academic background
- Education: Yonsei University; Bowling Green State University; University of Toledo

Academic work
- Discipline: Economics
- Institutions: University of Toledo
- Notable ideas: Operations management, global sourcing, supply chain management, new product development, global supply chain management
- Website: www.utoledo.edu/business/faculty/iotm/PaulHong.html

Paul Chongkung Hong is Distinguished University Professor of Operations Management at the University of Toledo, United States.

He is a specialist in innovation strategy, new product development, global supply chain management, SMEs and network capabilities

As of August 2019, he has more than 300 research articles and books, with close to 5000 citations. His h-index is 40 and i10-index is 43 according to Google Scholar. As per the details available at Scopus, he has received more than 2400 citations and his h-index is 29.

== Books ==
- Knowledge Integration in Integrated Product Development, Society of Automotive Engineers, PA USA, 2000, ISBN 0-7680-0801-8
- Building Network Capabilities in Turbulent Competitive Environments: Business Success Stories from the BRICs, CRC Press (Taylor & Francis Company), 2014, ISBN 1466515759, ISBN 978-1466515758

== Awards ==
- The Fulbright-Nehru Academic and Professional Excellence Award
