= Ed Sayles =

American musical theatre director (born 1952)

- Born: Edward Thomas Sayles; February 19, 1952 (age 74); Syracuse, New York, U.S.
- Occupations: Producing Director at the Merry-Go-Round Playhouse

Ed Sayles (born February 19, 1952) is an American musical theatre director. He is the owner of Creative Communication & Development

== Early years ==
Sayles was born in Syracuse, New York on February 19, 1952. After graduating with a BA in Speech Communication & History from SUNY College at Cortland, he was awarded a full scholarship and stipend by Bowling Green State University where he received a master's degree in Directing and Rhetoric from Bowling Green State University in Ohio.

== Career ==
After receiving his graduate degree, Sayles served as artistic director for a small theatre in Dayton, Ohio. While there, he helped create two new theater spaces: a 300-seat thrust space for the Trotwood Circle Theatre and a 250-seat experimental space for the First Street Theatre. In the fall of 1980, Sayles was hired as Producing Director of the REV Theatre Company formerly known as the Merry-Go-Round Playhouse.He succeeded the retiring founder, Susan Riford. He remained in that position until June of 2014. According to former REV Managing Director Lynnette Lee, the operating budget for the Playhouse grew from $180,000 to $5 million under Sayles' leadership. Attendance at the Summer Musical Theatre season grew from 9,000 to 50,000, and the number of students participating in the Educational Youth Theatre grew from 10,000 to over 125,000.

Sayles oversaw two major renovations to the Playhouse building, which is located in Auburn, NY. The first, in 1993, was an expansion from 325 seats to 365, and the addition of new dressing rooms and backstage facilities. In 2004, a $2.5 million renovation was completed, which included a full fly-system and orchestra pit, larger wing space, an expanded box office, new heating and cooling systems, and state-of-the-art lighting and sound systems. Most importantly of all, the renovation expanded the Playhouse seating from 365 to a Broadway-size house of 501 seats. This would eventually enable the Playhouse to earn the nickname of "Broadway in the Finger Lakes". During his tenure at the Playhouse he produced or directed over 200 plays and musicals. Favorite directing assignments included The Drowsy Chaperone (featuring Robert Moss) Crazy for You, Anything Goes, Big River, Antigone, As You Like it and Pictures at an American Exhibition.

In 2011 Sayles created the Finger Lakes Musical Theatre Festival which operated in tandem with the Playhouse. The festival was in operation from 2011 until 2015, one year after Sayles retired from the Playhouse. In the summer of 2012, consisted of 6 mainstages productions at the Merry-Go-Round Playhouse; 3 "Off-Broadway"-style shows presented at the Auburn Public Theater; and the PITCH which presented staged readings of new musical works at Theater Mack. The idea for The PITCH came to Sayles when was still in his High School. In an interview with Emerging Musical Theatre, Sayles explains the origins of The PITCH:

"I’ve always loved the movie Yankee Doodle Day with James Cagney as George M. Cohan. In the movie, Cohan and his partner Sam Harris meet with a producer, and Harris sits at the piano while Cohan “pitches” their story for a show in less than 15 minutes. Pitch. The idea stuck with me for a while. Over the years I’ve become disturbed at the production costs creative teams incur in the early stages of developing their musicals. So, The PITCH came into being as a way for creative teams to receive feedback about their work without any out-of-pocket expenses. This summer, The PITCH will be hosting 20 new musicals, which we hope will give them a start on the way to being fully realized productions. I suspect that a number of wonderful ideas for shows have never reached fruition because of the financial burdens that accompany the development process. It is my wish that, in a small way, this will remedy that problem."

In 2015 Sayles founded Creative Communication & Development which focuses on assisting Non-Profit organizations in a variety of areas. From 2015 to 2020 Sayles was Director of the Spotlight Showcase which is part of Mozaic. In that capacity he directed two ensembles composed of neuro-diverse performers. He also oversaw and annual art show featuring the work of neuro-diverse visual artists.

== Personal life ==
Sayles lives in Auburn, New York, with his wife Kathleen. They have three grown children: Austin, Celeste and Sarah.

== Honors ==
He has served two terms on the Theatre Panel of the New York State Council on the Arts. He has also been a member of the board of directors of the Cayuga Museum, the Cayuga County United Way, and the Cayuga County Office of Tourism. In 2006, the Cayuga County Legislature declared Friday, May 5, of that year to be "Ed Sayles Day" in recognition of his work as producing director for the Merry-Go-Round Playhouse, which "has become nationally recognized for the quality of both its musical and youth theatres," offering 10 different school productions each year in its curriculum-based in-school workshop and performance program, serving over 125,000 students in 70 school districts across New York State. Sayles was honored at the 28th Annual Theatre Educators' Conference in September 2012 with the Regional Award for Contributions to Educational & Regional Theatre.
