= Jules Maidoff =

American painter (born 1933)

- Born: May 6, 1933; New York City, U.S.
- Died: April 22, 2025 (aged 91)
- Known for: Painting
- Website: www.julesmaidoff.com

Jules Maidoff (May 6, 1933 – April 22, 2025) was an American artist.

== Biography ==
Maidoff grew up in the Bronx, New York where he attended New York High School of Industrial Art and Cooper Union. In 1955 he received his BA from City College of New York. While completing his MA at CCNY he was awarded a Fulbright Scholarship to Italy, where he spent one year. After returning to New York, he spent the next decade exhibiting his paintings and working in graphic design. Since 1973, he has lived and worked in Tuscany where, in 1975, he founded Studio Arts College International (formerly Studio Art Centers International).

== Career ==
Influenced by the Eastern European Jewish ancestry of his parents, as well as childhood visits to the Museum of Modern Art and the Metropolitan Museum of Art, Maidoff was drawn towards a narrative approach to painting. His coming of age during World War II also contributed greatly to his views on the artist's social responsibility. After traveling to Florence in 1956 as part of the Fulbright Program, his interest in the art of the Renaissance as well as the history of Italy took root, and he frequently returned while supporting his family with work in graphic design and advertising.

In 1973, he decided to relocate and concentrate on painting full time. Originally settling in Pian di Scò (where he had purchased a farmhouse in 1970), he began giving art lessons in his studio. Affiliations with study abroad programs led to the creation of an independently accredited nonprofit institution (SACI) which continues to this day as a degree-granting school at the graduate level.

In 2002, Maidoff's experience in Italy and the progression of his work was documented in the short film "Jules Maidoff: An American Painter in Italy", co-directed and shot by his daughter, Natasha Maidoff, and Jilann Spitzmiller.

== Collections ==
Critics have described Maidoff's work as being related to a figurative Expressionist tradition. In addition to painting, he has done extensive printmaking and ceramic work.

His works are in the collections of many museums worldwide such as the Royal Museum of Fine Arts of Belgium, the Museum of the City of Pisa, Riverside Museum in New York, Brandeis University Museum, The V. Emanuele Foundation in Cascais, the Museum of the City of Leiria, Portugal, the cities of Orvieto, San Giovanni, Siracusa and many more. His work is also in hundreds of private collections including those of the former president of Italy Alessandro Pertini, Robert Joffrey, Elizabeth Sackler, Connie Brittan, Jose Frentes Antunes, the Pritzker family, and Amalie Rothschild. Many catalogs and interviews have been made about his work and he has been written about by Mario de Micheli, Grace Gleuck, Joachim Burmeister, Carol Becker, and Laura Castro among others.

== See also ==
- SACI
