= Michael C. Heim =

American businessman

Michael C. Heim became vice president of information technology and chief information officer of Eli Lilly and Company in January 2004 and is a member of the operations committee.

He had been the chief technology officer with accountability for enterprise architecture and data strategy, the global implementation of SAP, and global financial and human resources information technology solutions since November 1999.

A native of Cincinnati, he received a Bachelor of Arts degree in business administration from Marian College in 1977 and a Master of Business Administration in 1978 from Bowling Green State University. Heim joined Lilly in 1979 as an analyst in the corporate information systems group. He became a staff financial auditor in 1981 and later became the company's first certified information systems auditor. In 1985, he rejoined information systems as manager with responsibility for manufacturing, marketing, financial and human resource systems support.

Following a cross-functional assignment in as manager of engineering for facilities delivery administration, he was named director of information systems-medical operations in 1992. In 1995, he was promoted to information officer for Lilly Research Laboratories and in 1998 was named information officer for European and intercontinental operations with responsibility for IT activities outside the United States.

Heim serves on a number of external councils, including the Microsoft Pharmaceutical Advisory Council, the SAP Life Sciences Executive Council, the Marian College Technology Advisory Board, the Members Board at the Missouri Botanical Gardens, and the board of directors of Interactive Intelligence Inc.
