= Tim McCreight =

American artist (born 1951)

- Born: 1951 (age 73–74); Philadelphia, Pennsylvania, U.S.

Tim McCreight (born 1951) is an American artist who specializes in metalsmithing, particularly in jewelry. He is also an author of books referring to metalsmithing.

== Biography ==
=== Early life and education ===
Tim McCreight was born in 1951 in Philadelphia, Pennsylvania. He attended The College of Wooster from 1969 to 1973 and received a BA degree in sculpture under Sufi Ahmad. After College of Wooster, he graduated from Bowling Green State University in 1975, receiving a MFA degree in jewelry and metalsmithing under Harold Hasselschwert and Chuck Evans.

=== Career ===
McCreight taught at the Maine College of Art from 1988 to 2005 and at Worcester Center for Crafts for 12 years before that. He also served on several boards of directors, including the Haystack Mountain School of Crafts and the Society of North American Goldsmiths (SNAG) where he also served as president. He is the founding director and communications officer for the Precious Metal Clay Guild.

McCreight has taught scores of workshops in the US, Canada, Europe, and Japan. He is perhaps best known for his textbooks, which cover subject matters as diverse as knifemaking, casting, jewelry techniques, rendering, and design. He has also created a half dozen instructional videos that are widely respected for their clarity and breadth. In addition to his own books, he has designed and edited books for authors from several countries through his publishing company Brynmorgen Press.

In 2014 McCreight co-founded the Toolbox Initiative, which distributes donated tools and supplies to jewelers with limited resources especially in West Africa.

== Published works ==
- Metalworking for Jewelry: Tools, Materials, Techniques (Van Nostrand Reinhold Co., 1979)
- Custom Knifemaking: 10 Projects from a Master Craftsman (Stackpole Books, 1985)
- Practical Casting: A Studio Reference (Brynmorgen Press, 1986)
- The Complete Metalsmith: An Illustrated Handbook (Davis Publications, 1991)
- Metals Technic: A Collection of Techniques for Metalsmiths (Brynmorgen Press, 1992)
- Practical Jewelry Rendering (Brynmorgen Press, 1993)
- Design Language (Brynmorgen Press, 1996)
- Jewelry: Fundamentals of Metalsmithing (Hand Books Press, 1997)
- The Metalsmith's Book of Boxes & Lockets (Hand Books Press, 1999)
- Working with Precious Metal Clay with Jeff McCreight, Kate O'Halloran, Jobie Fagans (Brynmorgen Press, 2000)
- Color on Metal: 50 Artists Share Insights and Techniques with Nicole Bsullak (Guild Publications, 2001)
- The Syntax of Objects (Brynmorgen Press, 2005)
- Jewelry Making: Techniques for Metal (Dover Publications, 2005)
- PMC Decade: The First Ten Years of Precious Metal Clay with Randy A Wardell, Ken Devos (Brynmorgen Press, 2006)
- Practical Joining (Brynmorgen Press, 2006)
- PMC Technic (Brynmorgen Press, 2007)
