= The Elusive Quest for Growth =

2001 book by William Easterly

The Elusive Quest for Growth: Economists' Adventures and Misadventures in the Tropics
- Author: William Easterly
- Language: English
- Subject: Development Economics
- Publisher: MIT Press
- Publication date: July 1, 2001
- Pages: 400
- ISBN: 978-0-262-05065-4

The Elusive Quest For Growth: Economists' Adventures and Misadventures in the Tropics is a 2001 book by World Bank development economist William Easterly. Upon its release, the book received acclaim from such figures as Bruce Bartlett, Robert Solow, and Paul Romer, and has since become widely cited in the Economic Development literature.

Easterly's primary thesis is that the numerous efforts to remedy extreme poverty in the Third World have failed because they have neglected that individuals, businesses, governments, and donors respond to incentives. Thus, he argues, the failure of economic development in poor tropical nations is not the failure of economics, but the failure to apply economic principles to practical policy work. Inspired by the moral imperative to improve the lives of the poor, his recommendation is not to abandon the quest, but to improve the institutions of governments and international actors to create incentives that promote growth.

== Panaceas that failed ==
The first section of the book is dedicated to the various Post-WWII efforts to promote economic growth among impoverished tropical nations. Early efforts to promote investment and capital accumulation were based on the Harrod-Domar Model, the Lewis Model, and Rostow's stages of growth, which proposed that GDP growth would always be proportional to the share of investment in GDP, and that capital accumulation was the critical factor for growth. These models justified huge amounts of aid from Western governments and intergovernmental organizations, to fill the "finance gap" between domestic savings and required investment. Easterly, however, demonstrates that most aid did not go into investment in the years 1965-1995, and finds no statistical association between investment and growth. As Robert Solow discovered in the late 1950s, it is not just investment in machines but investment in ever-improving machinery—technological progress—that improves worker productivity in the long-run.

Easterly also discusses the failed efforts of states to use education, family planning, and debt forgiveness as means to grow out of poverty. He notes that there is little incentive for a student in a poor country to value and invest in her own education if there is no future return for that investment. In more corrupt countries the very skilled opt to apply themselves to lobbying the government and other activities that redistribute income rather than activities that create new value. For education to provide a return on the investment, the society must have well-functioning institutions and markets that foster a demand for skilled individuals.

Easterly also highlights the problematic nature of structural adjustment loan programs—aid given under certain conditions—which became very popular in the 1980s. Rather than initiating true economic reform, states only pretended to adjust their policies. Because shortfalls would elicit increased loans and donors demonstrated little interest in revoking aid, there was little incentive for states to improve their policies. Debt forgiveness regimes produced the same moral hazard, as authoritarian governments considered forgiveness as a free pass to continue to steal from their peoples' futures. Easterly suggests that aid should be tied to prior achievement rather than promises of political leaders, and that aid should increase with further improvement (similar to the incentive structure of the Earned Income Tax Credit).

== People respond to incentives ==
The second section of the book outlines how the poor often do see incentives to invest in their futures. Bad luck, poverty traps, and corrupt governments plague individual efforts to overcome poverty. Easterly argues that "getting incentives right is not itself another new panacea for development. It is a principle that has to be implemented bit by bit, stripping away the encrusted layers of vested interests with the wrong incentives, giving entry to new people with the right incentives."

Easterly writes that it is very difficult for poor individuals to break free from the poverty trap because of "knowledge leaks" and "knowledge matching". Knowledge yields external benefits to a society (in that an idea is worth more to a society the more knowledge exists in that society) and it is worth more when matched with others with similar expertise. This is an example of economies of agglomeration. When a society is full of knowledge and there are various fields of expertise, individuals have more incentive to invest in education. But if the society is bereft of knowledge, individuals face little incentive to invest, or if they do, will likely leave the economy in a brain drain. According to Easterly, governments can help overcome poverty traps by subsidizing investment in new knowledge, reducing taxes on capital goods and technology, and actively seeking private investment.

According to Easterly, "the prime suspect for mucking up incentives is government." High inflation, negative interest rates, black market premiums, high government budget deficits, restrictions on free trade, poor public services, corruption, and arbitrary enforcement of property rights lower the return on private investment and create poor incentives for growth. However, good government can promote broad and deep growth when it holds itself accountable and "energetically takes up the task of investing in collective goods like health, education, and the rule of law." Transparent institutions that promote these and other economic freedoms ultimately foster a productive society.

== Critical response ==
Reviews of The Elusive Quest for Growth appeared in the Journal of Economic Literature, The Economist, Journal of International Affairs, Review of Radical Political Economics, and Development Policy Review. The Economist called it a "refreshing, iconoclastic book" which would leave its readers "chastened, instructed and entertained." One critique emphasized that while incentives are tautologically critical to development, economists are far from agreement on how major policies, such as liberalizing capital flows and liberalizing labor markets, affect incentives.

In the years following publication of Elusive Quest for Growth, Easterly became embroiled in a public debate with rival development economist Jeffrey Sachs over the role of foreign aid. According to Abhijit Banerjee and Esther Duflo, Easterly has become one of the most influential anti-aid public figures, following the publication of two books, The Elusive Quest for Growth and The White Man's Burden."
