= Jeremy Zawodny =

MySQL expert

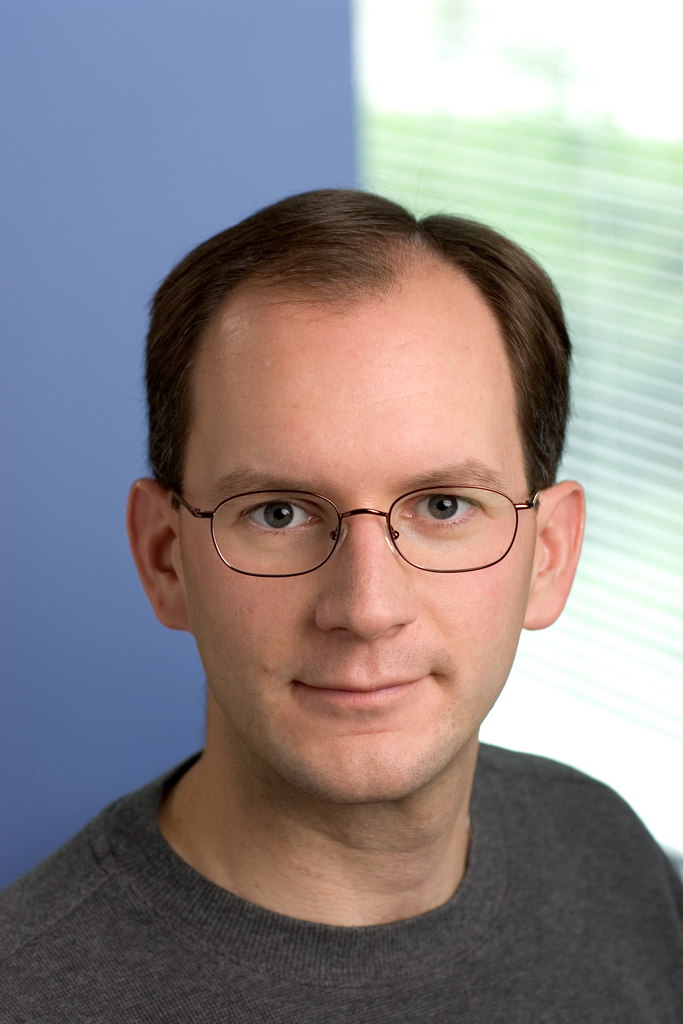
- Education: Bowling Green University
- Occupation: Web Developer
- Known for: Writing about Technology
- Notable work: High Performance MySQL (ISBN 0-596-00306-4)

Jeremy Zawodny was an employee of Craigslist until February 2024, having previously worked in Yahoo's platform engineering group, where he was described as "Yahoo!'s MySQL guru".

He maintains a popular blog focused on Yahoo! initiatives, which is listed in CNET News.com's index of the 100 best technology-related blogs. According to CNET, Zawodny has "helped put MySQL and other open-source technologies to use".

== Work at Yahoo! ==
Upon joining the company in 1999, he replaced the existing data-management system for the Yahoo! Finance news feed with MySQL.

He has also helped to launch the Yahoo! Search blog. He was part of Yahoo! Search's Technology Development team.

On June 12, 2008, Jeremy announced on his blog that he would be leaving Yahoo!. He worked at Yahoo for 8 1/2 years.

== Outside Yahoo! ==
Prior to joining Yahoo!, Zawodny worked for about two years at the Marathon Oil Company in Findlay, Ohio, in their Information Technology Services. Zawodny received a BS in computer science from Bowling Green State University with a minor in Astronomy.

Zawodny also writes a monthly column for Linux Magazine and speaks at numerous conferences about MySQL, Yahoo!, and open source.

He is also the co-author of High Performance MySQL (ISBN 0-596-00306-4) and holds a B.S. in Computer Science from Bowling Green State University.

== Weblog ==
Zawodny maintains a blog, which he started in 2002. It focuses on Yahoo! initiatives and has been praised as a "bridge blog", one that has helped build relationships for Yahoo! and attract potential employees to the company.

On May 24, 2003, he declared that Google's PageRank algorithm is no longer viable, due to bloggers and SEOs learning to game the system. Zawodny's article "inspired many interesting rebuttals".

Zawodny predicted on January 9, 2006, that "2006 will be the year in which once great Slashdot dies", its method of using an editorial staff losing out to increasingly popular community-driven competitors such as Digg and reddit. In response, The Guardian noted that Slashdot was apparently not losing traffic, suggesting that while a new breed of users were attracted to the younger sites, Slashdot readers were remaining loyal.

Although Zawodny is known for his enthusiasm for Yahoo!, his posts critical of the company have often been noted by the media. Such posts include his condemnation of Yahoo! software installations that alter user preferences as "insulting and disrespectful", an accusation that Yahoo! Finance suffered from a "lack of leadership" and "serious lack of vision", and a labeling of Yahoo!'s enterprise instant messenger as a "freaking money pit" and a product "customers don't want".

Zawodny was also an early advocate of RSS feeds at Yahoo! and predicted in 2003 that the technology would someday be ubiquitous.
