= SACI =

Arts college in Florence, Italy

Coordinates: 43°46′31.9″N 11°15′05.5″E

Facade of SACI

Studio Arts College International (SACI), Florence, Italy was an educational institution for undergraduate and graduate university-level students for studio art, design, and liberal arts instruction. SACI was founded by artist and director emeritus Jules Maidoff in Tuscany in 1975. In June 2021, the Board of Trustees communicated the closing process of the school, as a consequence of the financial challenges caused by the COVID-19 global pandemic.

== Study programs ==
SACI offered programs including: Academic Year & Semester Abroad, Post-Baccalaureate Programs in Conservation, 2-year MFA in Studio Art, an MA in Art History, a Venice Summer program and Summer Studies (including summer term non-credit study programs).

== History ==
SACI was the oldest American art school in Florence. The institution was founded in 1975 by painter Jules Maidoff.

Since 1975, over 10,000 students have attended SACI.

SACI's Conservation Department worked on paintings from the Renaissance, giving students the opportunity to learn while actually restoring works. Between 1996 and 2006, the department fully restored the historic Chapel of [(Santa Maria degli Angiolini)], which had been closed since 1966, when it was damaged by the flood.

In June 2021, SACI's Board of Trustees communicated that, due to the consequences of the global COVID-19 pandemics, including lockdowns and travel restrictions, it had initiated the closing process of the school.

== Facilities ==
SACI's main facilities are two historical palazzi in the center of Florence: the Palazzo dei Cartelloni, acquired in 1999, and the Palazzo Jules Maidoff for the Visual Arts, inaugurated in 2010.

Palazzo dei Cartelloni is 29,000-square-foot (2,700 m^{2}) located at Via Sant'Antonino 11. It contains gallery/exhibition space, classrooms, a library, offices, an art conservation laboratory, media facilities and studios surrounding a large, traditional Italian garden. The interiors have been restored to their original Baroque-era style, with painted ceilings, fresco-ed walls and marble floors. This location is in the vicinity of the Duomo, the churches of San Lorenzo and Santa Maria Novella, and is just steps away from the central market and the new Alinari photography museum. The Palazzo was remodeled as a residence in the 17th century for the mathematician Vincenzo Viviani, who had been a pupil of the astronomer and scientist Galileo Galilei. Viviani dedicated his home to his esteemed teacher and placed two large scrolls on the building's façade that describe the work and achievements of his master. He also added a bust of Galileo to the front facade that crowns the entranceway. Viviani created this monument to Galileo in defiance of the papal ban that forbade honoring the work of Galileo partly because of Galileo's assertion that, "The truth of nature is more important than traditional dogma." SACI's home is, therefore, a unique monument to a man who is considered "one of the two greatest sons of Florence" (along with Michelangelo Buonarroti), an accolade inscribed on the buildings scrolls.

SACI's newest facility is also a major palazzo in the center of Florence: the Jules Maidoff Palazzo for the Visual Arts, which is named after SACI's founder and director emeritus. This palazzo includes a floor with large, well-lit painting studios; SACI's new graduate center, with its own terrace and garden access; SACI's new design center and design library; fully equipped animation and fresco studios; a student lounge, with additional computers for student internet access; gallery spaces; two major lecture halls; and a Renaissance courtyard.

== SACI Gallery ==
Gallery of SACI

The SACI Gallery was designed by architect Paolo Bulletti and its renovation was made possible in part through a donation by artist Roger Phillips. The SACI Gallery is approximately 675 square feet (62.7 m^{2}), has high vaulted ceilings, movable partition walls, and is adjacent to a courtyard garden.
