= Bowling Green Falcons football statistical leaders =

The Bowling Green Falcons football statistical leaders are individual statistical leaders of the Bowling Green Falcons football program in various categories, including passing, rushing, receiving, total offense, defensive stats, and kicking. Within those areas, the lists identify single-game, single-season, and career leaders. The Falcons represent Bowling Green State University in the NCAA's Mid-American Conference.

Although Bowling Green began competing in intercollegiate football in 1919, the school's official record book generally does not have entries before the 1950s, as records from before this year are often incomplete and inconsistent.

These lists are dominated by more recent players for several reasons:

- Since the 1950s, seasons have increased from 10 games to 11 and then 12 games in length.
- The NCAA didn't allow freshmen to play varsity football until 1972 (with the exception of the World War II years), allowing players to have four-year careers.
- Bowl games only began counting toward single-season and career statistics in 2002. The Falcons have played in eight bowl games since this decision, giving many recent players an extra game to accumulate statistics.

These lists are updated through the end of the 2025 season.

== Passing ==
=== Passing yards ===
Career
Rank	Player	Yards	Years
1	Brian McClure	10,280	1982 1983 1984 1985
2	Tyler Sheehan	10,117	2006 2007 2008 2009
3	Matt Johnson	8,845	2012 2013 2014 2015
4	Matt Schilz	8,012	2010 2011 2012 2013
5	Josh Harris	7,503	2000 2001 2002 2003
6	Omar Jacobs	6,938	2003 2004 2005
7	Rich Dackin	6,862	1986 1987 1988 1989
8	Erik White	6,072	1989 1990 1991 1992
9	Matt McDonald	5,921	2020 2021 2022
10	Mark Miller	5,919	1974 1975 1976 1977

Single season
Rank	Player	Yards	Year
1	Matt Johnson	4,946	2015
2	Tyler Sheehan	4,051	2009
3	Omar Jacobs	4,002	2004
4	Josh Harris	3,813	2003
5	Matt Johnson	3,467	2013
6	Brian McClure	3,264	1983
	Tyler Sheehan	3,264	2007
8	James Knapke	3,173	2014
9	Connor Bazelak	3,044	2024
10	Matt Schilz	3,024	2011

Single game
Rank	Player	Yards	Year	Opponent
1	Tyler Sheehan	505	2009	Kent State
2	Matt Johnson	491	2015	Maryland
3	Brian McClure	479	1985	Ohio
4	Omar Jacobs	458	2005	Wisconsin
5	Matt Johnson	450	2015	UMass
6	Matt Johnson	443	2015	Memphis
	James Knapke	443	2014	UMass
8	Josh Harris	438	2003	Northern Illinois
9	Matt Schilz	437	2011	Wyoming
10	Matt Johnson	430	2015	at Kent State

=== Passing touchdowns ===
Career
Rank	Player	TDs	Years
1	Matt Johnson	73	2012 2013 2014 2015
2	Omar Jacobs	71	2003 2004 2005
3	Tyler Sheehan	70	2006 2007 2008 2009
4	Brian McClure	63	1982 1983 1984 1985
5	Josh Harris	55	2000 2001 2002 2003
6	Matt Schilz	51	2010 2011 2012 2013
7	Ryan Henry	46	1992 1993 1994 1995
8	Erik White	39	1989 1990 1991 1992
	Jarret Doege	39	2017 2018
10	Rich Dackin	36	1986 1987 1988 1989

Single season
Rank	Player	TDs	Year
1	Matt Johnson	46	2015
2	Omar Jacobs	41	2004
3	Matt Schilz	28	2011
4	Josh Harris	27	2003
	Jarret Doege	27	2018
6	Tyler Sheehan	27	2009
7	Omar Jacobs	26	2005
8	Ryan Henry	25	1994
	Matt Johnson	25	2013
10	Tyler Sheehan	23	2007

Single game
Rank	Player	TDs	Year	Opponent
1	Ryan Henry	6	1994	Ball State
	Matt Johnson	6	2015	Maryland
3	Omar Jacobs	5	2004	Memphis
	Omar Jacobs	5	2004	Marshall
	Omar Jacobs	5	2005	Wisconsin
	Matt Schilz	5	2011	Morgan State
	Matt Johnson	5	2013	Northern Illinois
	Matt Johnson	5	2015	Kent State
	Matt Johnson	5	2015	Akron
	Matt Johnson	5	2015	UMass
	James Morgan	5	2016	Toledo
	Matt McDonald	5	2022	Eastern Kentucky

== Rushing ==
=== Rushing yards ===
Career
Rank	Player	Yards	Years
1	Travis Greene	3,852	2012 2013 2014 2015
2	Dave Preston	3,423	1973 1974 1975 1976
3	Paul Miles	3,239	1971 1972 1973
4	P. J. Pope	3,116	2002 2003 2004 2005
5	Fred Coppet	2,833	2013 2014 2015 2016
6	Fred Durig	2,564	1950 1951 1952
7	Josh Harris	2,473	2000 2001 2002 2003
8	Terion Stewart	2,367	2020 2021 2023 2024
9	Bryant Jones	2,357	1980 1981 1982
10	LeRoy Smith	2,310	1989 1990 1991 1992

Single season
Rank	Player	Yards	Year
1	Travis Greene	1,594	2013
2	Fred Durig	1,444	1951
3	Dave Preston	1,414	1974
4	Travis Greene	1,299	2015
5	Paul Miles	1,185	1971
6	Dan Saleet	1,114	1975
7	P. J. Pope	1,098	2004
8	Bryant Jones	1,051	1981
9	Bernard White	1,036	1984
10	Paul Miles	1,030	1973
	Fred Coppet	1,030	2016

Single game
Rank	Player	Yards	Year	Opponent
1	Darryl Story	225	1983	Ball State
2	Steve Holmes	220	1998	Kent State
3	Paul Miles	217	1972	Marshall
4	Bryant Jones	212	1981	Kent State
5	Fred Durig	206	1951	Bradley
6	Chip Otten	205	1982	Eastern Michigan
7	Willie Geter	203	2007	Kent State

=== Rushing touchdowns ===
Career
Rank	Player	TDs	Years
1	Josh Harris	43	2000 2001 2002 2003
2	Dave Preston	39	1973 1974 1975 1976
3	Travis Greene	38	2012 2013 2014 2015
4	Bernard White	33	1984 1985
	P. J. Pope	33	2002 2003 2004 2005
6	Paul Miles	25	1971 1972 1973
7	Mike Wright	23	1976 1977 1978 1979
	LeRoy Smith	23	1989 1990 1991 1992
	Terion Stewart	23	2020 2021 2023 2024
10	Anthony Turner	22	2005 2006 2007 2008

Single season
Rank	Player	TDs	Year
1	Josh Harris	20	2002
2	Dave Preston	19	1974
3	Bernard White	18	1985
4	Bernard White	15	1984
	P. J. Pope	15	2004
	Travis Greene	15	2015

Single game
Rank	Player	TDs	Year	Opponent
1	Dave Preston	5	1974	Dayton
2	Chuck Radich	4	1966	Temple
	Fred Matthews	4	1968	Marshall
	Julius Livas	4	1970	Kent State
	Paul Miles	4	1972	Marshall
	Bernard White	4	1984	Richmond
	Bernard White	4	1985	Eastern Michigan

== Receiving ==
=== Receptions ===
Career
Rank	Player	Rec	Years
1	Freddie Barnes	297	2006 2007 2008 2009
2	Charles Sharon	232	2002 2003 2004 2005
3	Cole Magner	215	2001 2002 2003 2004
	Scotty Miller	215	2015 2016 2017 2018
5	Robert Redd	211	1998 1999 2001 2002
6	Ronnie Moore	198	2013 2014 2015 2016
7	Ryan Burbrink	189	2012 2013 2014 2015
8	Corey Partridge	182	2005 2006 2007 2008
	Mark Szlachcic	182	1989 1990 1991 1992
10	Harold Fannin Jr.	180	2022 2023 2024

Single season
Rank	Player	Rec	Year
1	Freddie Barnes	155	2009
2	Harold Fannin Jr.	117	2024
3	Cole Magner	99	2003
4	Kamar Jorden	96	2010
5	Gehrig Dieter	94	2015
6	Roger Lewis	85	2015
7	Robert Redd	83	2002
8	Freddie Barnes	82	2007
9	Kamar Jorden	78	2011
10	Cole Magner	77	2004

Single game
Rank	Player	Rec	Year	Opponent
1	Freddie Barnes	22	2009	Kent State
2	Freddie Barnes	17	2009	Idaho
	Freddie Barnes	17	2009	Marshall
	Harold Fannin Jr.	17	2024	Arkansas State
5	Roger Lewis	16	2014	Indiana
6	Freddie Barnes	15	2009	Troy
	Roger Lewis	15	2015	Maryland
8	Robert Redd	14	2002	Northern Illinois
	Corey Partridge	14	2007	Toledo
	Freddie Barnes	14	2009	Central Michigan
	Kamar Jorden	14	2010	Tulsa

=== Receiving yards ===
Career
Rank	Player	Yards	Years
1	Charles Sharon	3,450	2002 2003 2004 2005
2	Freddie Barnes	3,290	2006 2007 2008 2009
3	Scotty Miller	2,867	2015 2016 2017 2018
4	Robert Redd	2,726	1998 1999 2001 2002
5	Ronnie Moore	2,704	2013 2014 2015 2016
6	Stan Hunter	2,679	1982 1983 1984 1985
7	Roger Lewis	2,637	2014 2015
8	Mark Szlachcic	2,507	1989 1990 1991 1992
9	Ronald Heard	2,491	1986 1987 1988 1989
10	Harold Fannin Jr.	2,396	2022 2023 2024

Single season
Rank	Player	Yards	Year
1	Freddie Barnes	1,770	2009
2	Harold Fannin Jr.	1,555	2024
3	Roger Lewis	1,544	2015
4	Scotty Miller	1,148	2018
5	Cole Magner	1,138	2003
6	Kamar Jorden	1,109	2010
7	Stan Hunter	1,107	1983
8	Roger Lewis	1,093	2014
9	Kamar Jorden	1,089	2011
10	Charles Sharon	1,070	2004

Single game
Rank	Player	Yards	Year	Opponent
1	Freddie Barnes	278	2009	Kent State
2	Roger Lewis	261	2015	Memphis
3	Odieu Hiliare	246	2022	Toledo
4	Freddie Barnes	219	2009	Idaho
5	Robert Redd	215	2001	Marshall
6	Chris Gallon	213	2012	Kent State
	Harold Fannin Jr.	213	2024	Arkansas State
8	Robert Redd	209	2002	Missouri
9	Scotty Miller	206	2018	Western Michigan
10	Kamar Jorden	203	2011	Kent State

=== Receiving touchdowns ===
Career
Rank	Player	TDs	Years
1	Charles Sharon	34	2002 2003 2004 2005
2	Freddie Barnes	30	2006 2007 2008 2009
3	Ronnie Redd	27	1991 1992 1993 1994
4	Robert Redd	26	1998 1999 2001 2002
5	Steve Sanders	24	2002 2003 2004 2005
6	Roger Lewis	23	2014 2015
	Scotty Miller	23	2015 2016 2017 2018
8	Stan Hunter	21	1982 1983 1984 1985
9	Ronnie Moore	19	2013 2014 2015 2016
10	Mark Szlachcic	18	1989 1990 1991 1992

Single season
Rank	Player	TDs	Year
1	Freddie Barnes	19	2009
2	Roger Lewis	16	2015
3	Charles Sharon	15	2004
4	Steve Sanders	14	2005
5	Kamar Jorden	12	2011
6	Jim Ladd	11	1952
7	Ronnie Redd	10	1994
	Cole Magner	10	2003
	Charles Sharon	10	2003
	Gehrig Dieter	10	2015
	Scotty Miller	10	2016
	Harold Fannin Jr.	10	2024

Single game
Rank	Player	TDs	Year	Opponent
1	Jeff Groth	4	1978	Grand Valley State
	Eugene Cooper	4	2011	Morgan State

== Total offense ==
Total offense is the sum of passing and rushing statistics. It does not include receiving or returns.

=== Total offense yards ===
Career
Rank	Player	Yards	Years
1	Tyler Sheehan	10,465	2006 2007 2008 2009
2	Josh Harris	9,976	2000 2001 2002 2003
3	Brian McClure	9,774	1982 1983 1984 1985
4	Matt Johnson	9,224	2012 2013 2014 2015
5	Matt Schilz	7,794	2010 2011 2012 2013
6	Omar Jacobs	7,389	2003 2004 2005
7	Rich Dackin	6,527	1986 1987 1988 1989
8	Mark Miller	6,329	1974 1975 1976 1977
9	Erik White	6,226	1989 1990 1991 1992
10	Matt McDonald	5,979	2020 2021 2022

Single season
Rank	Player	Yards	Year
1	Matt Johnson	5,105	2015
2	Josh Harris	4,643	2003
3	Omar Jacobs	4,302	2004
4	Tyler Sheehan	4,043	2009
5	Matt Johnson	3,705	2013
6	Tyler Sheehan	3,461	2007
7	James Knapke	3,309	2014
8	Josh Harris	3,162	2002
9	Brian McClure	3,009	1983
10	Matt Schilz	2,964	2011

Single game
Rank	Player	Yards	Year	Opponent
1	Josh Harris	527	2003	Northern Illinois
2	Josh Harris	498	2001	Northwestern
3	Tyler Sheehan	492	2009	Kent State
4	Matt Johnson	486	2015	Maryland
5	Matt Johnson	484	2015	Memphis
6	Matt Johnson	475	2015	Kent State
7	Brian McClure	471	1985	Ohio
8	Omar Jacobs	462	2004	Central Michigan
9	Matt Johnson	460	2015	Purdue
10	James Knapke	459	2014	UMass

=== Touchdowns responsible for ===
"Touchdowns responsible for" is the NCAA's official term for combined passing and rushing touchdowns.

Career
Rank	Player	TDs	Years
1	Josh Harris	98	2000 2001 2002 2003
2	Tyler Sheehan	84	2006 2007 2008 2009
3	Matt Johnson	82	2012 2013 2014 2015
4	Omar Jacobs	78	2003 2004 2005
5	Brian McClure	67	1982 1983 1984 1985
6	Matt Schilz	55	2010 2011 2012 2013
7	Mark Miller	50	1974 1975 1976 1977
	Ryan Henry	50	1992 1993 1994 1995
9	Jarret Doege	43	2017 2018
10	Erik White	43	1989 1990 1991 1992

Single season
Rank	Player	TDs	Year
1	Matt Johnson	50	2015
2	Omar Jacobs	45	2004
3	Josh Harris	40	2003
4	Josh Harris	39	2002
5	Tyler Sheehan	31	2009
6	Matt Johnson	30	2013
7	Jarret Doege	29	2018
8	Matt Schilz	28	2011
9	Omar Jacobs	27	2005
	Tyler Sheehan	27	2008

Single game
Rank	Player	TDs	Year	Opponent
1	Ryan Henry	6	1994	Ball State
	Matt Johnson	6	2015	Kent State
	Matt Johnson	6	2015	Maryland
	Matt McDonald	6	2022	Eastern Kentucky

== Defense ==
=== Interceptions ===
Career
Rank	Player	Ints	Years
1	Martin Bayless	27	1980 1981 1982 1983
2	Janssen Patton	18	2000 2001 2002 2003
3	Dave Bielinski	14	1989 1990 1991 1992
4	Jac Tomasello	13	1978 1979 1981 1982

Single season
Rank	Player	Ints	Year
1	Max Minnich	12	1948
2	Martin Bayless	10	1983
3	Martin Bayless	7	1981
	Tony McCorvey	7	1988
	Joe Bair	7	1992
	Janssen Patton	7	2003
	P. J. Mahone	7	2007

Single game
Rank	Player	Ints	Year	Opponent
1	Jack Harbaugh	3	1959	Delaware
	Arch Tunnell	3	1960	Cal Poly
	Shawn Simms	3	1981	Toledo
	Jac Tomasello	3	1981	Kent State
	Martin Bayless	3	1983	Ball State
	Carlos Brooks	3	1992	Kent State
	Janssen Patton	3	2000	Kent State
	Janssen Patton	3	2003	Western Michigan
	Janssen Patton	3	2003	Northern Illinois

=== Tackles ===
Career
Rank	Player	Tackles	Years
1	Vince Palko	478	1991 1992 1993 1994
2	Kevin O'Neill	462	1994 1995 1996 1997
3	Troy Dawson	455	1982 1983 1984 1985
4	John Villapiano	439	1971 1972 1973
5	Kyle Kramer	399	1985 1986 1987 1988
6	Erik Johnson	382	1984 1985 1986 1987
7	Terry Wilson	379	1988 1989 1990 1991

Single season
Rank	Player	Tackles	Year
1	Richard Duetemeyer	163	1971
2	John Villapiano	160	1971
	John Villapiano	160	1972
	Mike Callesen	160	1977
5	Troy Dawson	157	1984

=== Sacks ===
Career
Rank	Player	Sacks	Years
1	Kevin O'Brien	31.0	1989 1990 1991 1992
2	Chris Jones	28.0	2009 2010 2011 2012
3	Karl Brooks	27.5	2018 2019 2020 2021 2022
4	Diyral Briggs	26.0	2005 2006 2007 2008
5	Devon Parks	22.0	2003 2004 2005 2006
	Myles Bradley	22.0	2023 2024 2025 2026
7	Brandon Hicks	20.0	1998 1999 2000 2001
8	Mitch Crossley	18.0	2001 2002 2003 2004
9	Ryan Wingrave	15.0	1998 1999 2000 2001
10	Kevin O'Neill	13.0	1994 1995 1996 1997
	Willie Gibson	13.0	1993 1994

Single season
Rank	Player	Sacks	Year
1	Kevin O'Brien	19.0	1992
2	Myles Bradley	16.0	2026
3	Chris Jones	12.5	2012
4	Karl Brooks	10.0	2022
5	Diyral Briggs	9.5	2008
	Cashius Howell	9.5	2023
7	Mitch Crossley	9.0	2003
	Devon Parks	9.0	2006
9	Chris Jones	8.5	2011
10	Joe Foley	8.0	1986
	Paul Harris	8.0	1991
	Bryan Thomas	8.0	2014

== Kicking ==
=== Field goals made ===
Career
Rank	Player	FGs	Years
1	Tyler Tate	56	2012 2013 2014 2015
2	Shaun Suisham	45	2001 2002 2003 2004
3	Brian Leaver	44	1991 1992 1993 1994
4	Gehad Youssef	44	1981 1982 1983 1984
5	Jason Zeller	43	1986 1987 1988 1989
6	Jason Strasser	39	1996 1997 1998 1999
7	Nate Needham	35	2018 2019 2020 2021
8	Don Taylor	33	1972 1973 1974 1975

Single season
Rank	Player	FGs	Year
1	Tyler Tate	23	2014
2	Brian Leaver	21	1994
3	Nate Needham	19	2021
	Jackson Kleather	19	2025
5	Tyler Tate	18	2013
	Jake Suder	18	2017
7	Gehad Youssef	16	1983
	Jason Zeller	16	1989
	Shaun Suisham	16	2003
10	Sinisa Vrvilo	15	2007

Single game
Rank	Player	FGs	Year	Opponent
1	Brian Leaver	5	1994	Kent State
