= Bowling Green Falcons football =

Sports program

2026 Bowling Green Falcons football team
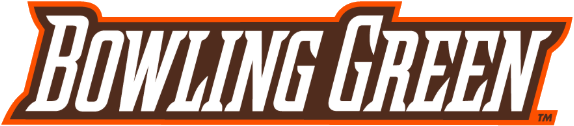
- First season: 1919; 107 years ago
- Athletic director: Derek van der Merwe
- Head coach: Eddie George; 2nd season, 4–8 (.333)
- Location: Bowling Green, Ohio
- Stadium: Doyt Perry Stadium (capacity: 24,000)
- NCAA division: Division I FBS
- Conference: MAC
- Colors: Brown and orange
- All-time record: 573–440–52 (.562)
- Bowl record: 5–10 (.333)

Small college national championships
- 1959

Conference championships
- NOL: 1921, 1922, 1925, 1928, 1929 MAC: 1956, 1959, 1961, 1962, 1964, 1965, 1982, 1985, 1991, 1992, 2013, 2015

Division championships
- MAC West: 2003 MAC East: 2005, 2007, 2013, 2014, 2015
- Rivalries: Kent State (rivalry); Toledo (rivalry)
- Fight song: Forward Falcons (Official)
- Mascot: Freddie and Frieda Falcon
- Marching band: Falcon Marching Band
- Outfitter: Nike, Inc.
- Website: BGSUFalcons.com

The Bowling Green Falcons football program is the intercollegiate football team of Bowling Green State University. The team is a member of the NCAA, playing at the Division I Football Bowl Subdivision, formerly Division I-A, level; BGSU football competes within the Mid-American Conference. The Falcons have played their home games in Doyt Perry Stadium since 1966. The stadium holds 24,000 spectators. In their 93-year history, the Falcons have won 12 MAC championships and a UPI national championship in 1959. The head coach is currently Eddie George.

== History ==
=== Early history (1919–1923) ===
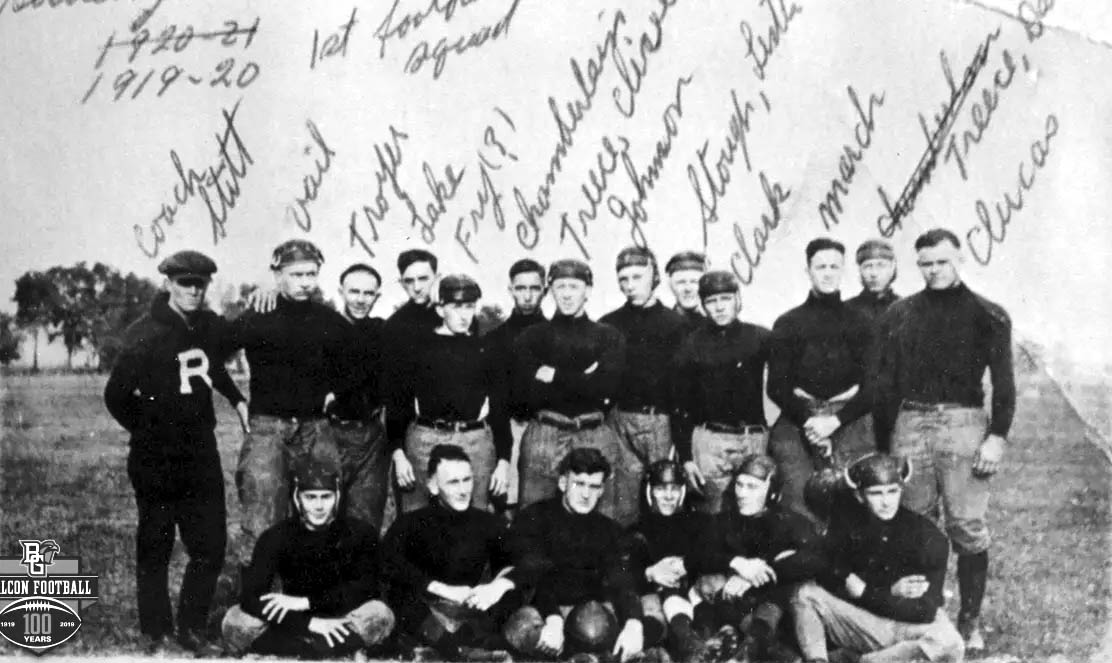
1919–20 team, the first fielded by the university

The football program was born shortly after the university opened, at the time known as the Bowling Green Normal School. In the early years of Bowling Green State Normal College, common nicknames of BG athletic teams used by sports writers were “B.G. Normals,” “Teachers,” and the “B.G. Pedagogues". The team began play in 1919 and played on a local field behind the Ridge Street School in Bowling Green, Ohio. The first team was composed of nineteen male students, over half of the 36 men that enrolled in the college. The roster included Ivan "Doc" Lake, who would later would give the Falcons their nickname. John Stitt served as the program's first football coach during the initial 3-game 1919 season. The first football game in BG's history was held on October 3, 1919, against Toledo University, a series that would turn into a rivalry that still exists in the present day. The game ended with a 6–0 score. The second game of the season marked BG's first road game at Defiance College, where the team dropped to 0–2 with a 12–0 shutout. In the final game of the short season the team lost to Michigan State Normal College (Eastern Michigan) 10–0. In the 1920 season, BG recorded its first score in a 10–6 loss at Findlay College. The 1920 team later recorded the program's first win, in the eighth and final game of the season, when the team defeated Kent State Normal College 7–0.

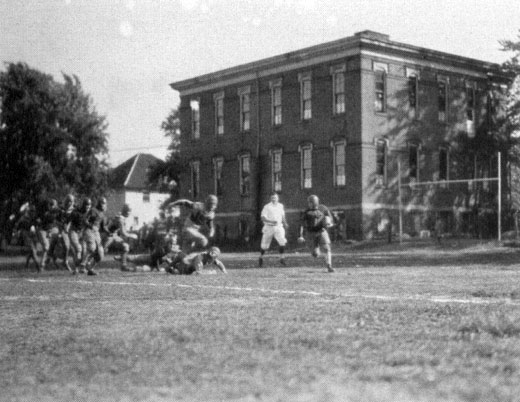
A game at the Ridge Street School in 1921

The team joined the Northwest Ohio League starting in the 1921 season. In the first game BG and Kent battled to a scoreless tie in a game that saw no fan attendance due to influenza epidemic. After a 7–0 win over Defiance, BG faced Findlay on October 15, 1921, in a game that set a national collegiate record in which BG scored 22 touchdowns to win 151–0 over Findlay College. Despite dropping the following game 27–0 to Ashland College, the team finished the season with a record of 3–1–1 and won the Northwest Ohio League conference championship, the first title in school history. The team would repeat as the NWOIAA Champions in 1922, 1925, 1928 and 1929.

=== Warren Steller era (1924–1934) ===
Warren Steller became the head coach of BG in 1924 and in his second season as head coach, BG recorded its first one-loss season in 1925. The record was repeated two seasons later, in 1927, when the team dropped its final game of the season 12–6 to Bluffton. During the same season, Ivan "Doc" Lake, a BG alumnus and football player on the original team, suggested the nickname "Falcons". The nickname's popularity grew rapidly and was adopted by the school. In 1928, the Falcons recorded their first undefeated season with a record of 5–0–2. The team was led by Chet Chapman, who received the conference MVP award and also became Bowling Green's first All-American. Steller's Falcons repeated the feat just a few seasons later, in 1930, when the team went 6–0–2. The 1931 season marked the team's final year that the Falcons participated in the Northwest Ohio League. The team joined the Ohio Athletic Conference (OAC) in 1933, after it played one season as an independent team. Warren Steller's last season as head coach of BG football came in 1934. In the years after he continued to serve as the manager of the baseball team and also served as athletic director until 1941.

=== Harry Ockerman era (1935–1940) ===
The Falcons struggled in their initial seasons as a member of the OAC, when the team recorded a losing record in three straight seasons from 1933 to 1935. The first winning record came in 1936 when the Falcons finished the season with a record of 4–2–3. In 1937, University Stadium was dedicated as the team's home stadium. The venue was located in the northeast part of campus and replaced the field and wooden bleachers with a larger capacity, permanent structure with the aid of Federal funding part of the Works Progress Administration. The new stadium did not provide much home field advantage, with BG only recording two home wins and ending the season 3–4–1. One of the team's best seasons in the OAC came in 1939 when BG finished with a record of 6–1–1. The Falcons came within a point of an undefeated season, their only loss to Capital by the score of 7–6.

=== Robert Whittaker era (1941–1954) ===
Robert Whittaker became head coach in 1941 and guided the Falcons to their best record as a member of the Ohio Athletic Conference when the team outscored opponents by a combined score of 173–40 and recorded a 7–1–1 overall record; and finished as one of four undefeated teams in conference play with a conference record of 4–0–1, along with Case Institute of Technology, Ohio Northern and Toledo. From 1942 until 1952 The team played independent of a conference affiliation until the university joined the Mid-American Conference (MAC). The highlight of BG's independent years came in 1948 when the Falcons went 8–0–1. The only blemish on the season came at the hands of John Carroll, when the teams battled to tie score of 13–13. Bowling Green had initial success in the new conference and finished with a record of 7–2 in the 1952 season. The only losses on the season to Miami (OH) and Ohio. The success of the first MAC season was short-lived with Bowling Green only winning 3 games over the next two seasons; and in 1955, Doyt Perry replaced Whittaker as head coach.

=== Doyt Perry era (1955–1964) ===
Doyt Perry coached the team 1955–1964

Perry, who attended Bowling Green and was a three-sport athlete for the Falcons and the captain of the football, basketball and baseball teams in 1931–32 returned to Bowling Green after serving as a high school coach at Upper Arlington and the offensive backfield coach of Ohio State. Perry changed the culture of the program, and focused on decreases in mistakes, penalties, fumbles, interceptions, blocked kicks and missed assignments. With the new coach and coaching style, the team's record quickly turned around and finished with a 7–1–1 record Perry's first season as head coach. In that season, the team's only loss came to the Miami RedHawks by the score of 7–0. The team outscored opponents 224–53, compared to being outscored 125–196 in the 1954 season. The team continued success into the 1956 season and recorded seven straight victories before picking up a 7–7 tie vs. Miami (OH) and finishing the season with an eight win on the season for a final unbeaten record of 8–0–1 and Bowling Green's first MAC Championship. After two successful seasons in 1957 and 1958, in which the Falcons went 13–3–2 overall between the two season, The season included conference wins over Miami, Kent State, Ohio, Toledo, and Western Michigan and non-conference opponents of Dayton, Delaware, Marshall, and Southern Illinois. BG recorded two games where the team scored 51 points, and the closest game of the season was a 13–9 win over Ohio in the last game of the season on November 21. Bowling Green finished the year with a perfect record of 9–0 and was the Mid-American Conference champion and was named small college national champion by the AP and the UPI. The next season, the Falcons began the season with a 5–0 record that included wins over MAC rivals Miami, Toledo and Kent State. And on October 29, 1960, the team got a sixth straight win on the season and seventeenth straight victory overall, beating California Polytechnic 50–6. Shortly after the victory, news spread that the Mustangs' plane crashed on takeoff when leaving Toledo. Two weeks later, the team faced Ohio University in a rematch of the championship-clinching game in the 1959 season. The Bobcats snapped the team's 18-game win streak and ended the team's chance at a second consecutive national title. With the 14–7 win, the Bobcats earned the MAC championship and went on to win the small college national championship. The Falcons went on to beat Texas-El Paso and finished the season with an 8–1 record, ranked second in the MAC. The 1961 team finishing the regular season with an 8–1 record in the regular season, the single loss to Miami (OH) by one point, 7–6. Despite the loss, the Falcons claimed their third MAC title and was selected to play in the Mercy Bowl, the program's first bowl game. The team flew to California to play Fresno State at the Los Angeles Memorial Coliseum. Proceeds of the game went to the survivors and families of the Cal Poly plane crash. The Falcons lost the game 36–6 but over $170,000 was raised for the victims.

Bowling Green repeated as MAC champions in 1962, and finished the season with a record of 7–1–1 with a 24–24 tie at Miami (OH) and a 23–7 non-conference road loss to West Texas State. In the 1963 season, Bowling Green ended with a record of 8–2, including a home loss to Miami Redskins and a road loss at Ohio. The Falcons started the 1964 season on an eight-game winning streak. In the ninth game of the season, Bowling Green faced tough rival, Ohio and was held scoreless with the Bobcats winning 21–0. The team rebounded in the final game of the season to beat Xavier 35–7 and claimed the MAC Championship. BG finished the season with a 9–1 record and outscored opponents 275–87. Perry stepped down as head coach of the football team after the 1964 season to take a position as the athletic director at the university and served in the position until 1970. He finished with an overall record of 77–11–5 and a conference record of 46–8–5 over ten seasons. During Perry's tenure at Bowling Green, he won five Mid-American Conference championships and one small college national championship. His .855 winning percentage placed Perry among the top five in college football history and he was inducted to the College Football Hall of Fame in 1988.

=== Bob Gibson era (1965–1967) ===
Bob Gibson, a long-time assistant coach at BG, was hired to replace Perry as head coach of the Falcons. In the 1965 season the team again won another MAC title with a 7–2 record. The Falcons continued their winning ways under Gibson in 1966 and 1967, posting records of 6–3 and 6–4 respectively. Gibson departed Bowling Green after the 1967 season with a 19–9 record.

=== Don Nehlen era (1968–1976) ===
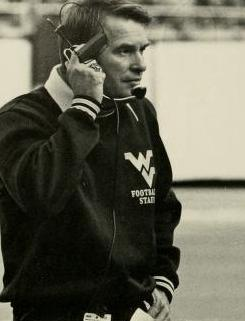
Don Nehlen coached the team 1968–1976

After one season as an assistant coach to Gibson, Don Nehlen took over as head coach for the Falcons in 1968. Nehlen played quarterback at Bowling Green from 1955 to 1957 and led the team to the 1956 MAC championship. After graduating from BG, he began his coaching career in 1958 at Mansfield Senior High School. He later served as head coach at Canton South High School and Canton McKinley High School and an assistant coach at the University of Cincinnati. The Falcons welcomed Nehlen in as head coach with a 62–8 win over Ball State and opened the 1968 season on a three-game win streak. The team finished the season 6–3–1 and followed with a 6–4 record in the 1969 season. Despite a 2–6–1 record in the 1970 season, Bowling Green rebounded back to a 6–4 record in 1971.

The Falcons began Nehlen's fifth season as head coach against Purdue on September 16, 1972. The game was tied in the fourth quarter when the Falcons moved into field goal range and Don Taylor kicked the ball through the uprights to give the Falcons a 17–14 upset win against a top 20 ranked opponent. In the 1973 season, BG again picked up a big opening win, at Syracuse 41–14. The Falcons' rushing game greatly improved under Nehlen. The team was led by Paul Miles, who ran for more than 1,000 yards in three consecutive seasons from 1971 to 1973. Miles teammate, Dave Preston earned a position as the career leader in rushing with 3,423 yards during his time with the Falcons. In 1975, Dan Saleet rushed for a team leading 1,114 yards. Nehlen led the Falcons added two more upsets in the Nehlen era with a 23–21 win over BYU and a 22–7 win against Syracuse in 1975 and 1976 respectively. The major wins gave Nehlen the unofficial title of the “Master of the Upset” from many BGSU fans. Nehlen left Bowling Green after the 1976 season and guided the Falcons to a 53–35–4 record in nine seasons as head coach. He went on to coach at West Virginia and coached 21 seasons for the Mountaineers and became the 17th coach in NCAA Division I-A history to record 200 victories with a 202–128–8 overall record.

=== Denny Stolz era (1977–1985) ===
Former Michigan State head coach Denny Stolz was hired as the 12th head coach of the Bowling Green Falcons in 1977. He coached the team to a 22–33–1 in his first five seasons, with the first four having exactly seven losses. But in his sixth season, he coached them to a MAC title, their first since 1965, culminating with an appearance in the California Bowl, their first ever bowl game appearance. His next two seasons were both 8–3 but with no MAC titles, finishing 2nd twice.

In Stolz's final season, the Falcons went 11–0 in the regular season, won the MAC title, and appeared in the California Bowl once again. Stolz left his Bowling Green team out in California and never got the Falcons ready to play vs Fresno State and the Falcons were beaten for the first time all season and ended 11–1, while Stolz went to San Diego to coach San Diego State, leaving BGSU after two MAC titles and a 56–45–1 record, going 34–12–0 in his last four seasons.

=== Moe Ankney era (1986–1990) ===
Arizona defensive coordinator and associate head coach Moe Ankney was hired as the 13th head coach of the Falcons after Stolz's departure. Ironically, despite finishing 5–6 in his first two years, they had finished tied for 2nd in the MAC. But the bottom fell out in his third season, with his team going 2–8–1 and finishing eighth out of nine teams. His next two seasons were only marginally better, finishing 5–6 and 3–5–2. After five losing seasons, Ankney resigned to become defensive coordinator at Purdue, finishing with a record of 20–31–3.

=== Gary Blackney era (1991–2000) ===
Ohio State linebackers coach Gary Blackney was hired as the 14th head coach of the Falcons in 1990. His first season ended with a 10–1 regular season, MAC title, a win in the California Bowl which was their first ever bowl win. The next season proved to be even better, as the team finished with a 2nd straight MAC title, a 9–2 regular season, and a Las Vegas Bowl victory. In 1994, his team came within one game of winning a third MAC title, before a loss to Central Michigan on a fake punt touchdown. Blackney's Falcons finished 9–2 in 1994. In his first four seasons, Blackney had coached the Falcons to a 36–8–2 record.

But after the Central Michigan debacle that ended that season, Blackney's record in the next six seasons was a paltry 24–42, with his last season being the worst, as they finished 2–9. Four games in with an 0–4 start, Blackney decided to quit as soon as the season ended, leaving the Falcons after compiling a 60–50–2 record.

=== Urban Meyer era (2001–2002) ===
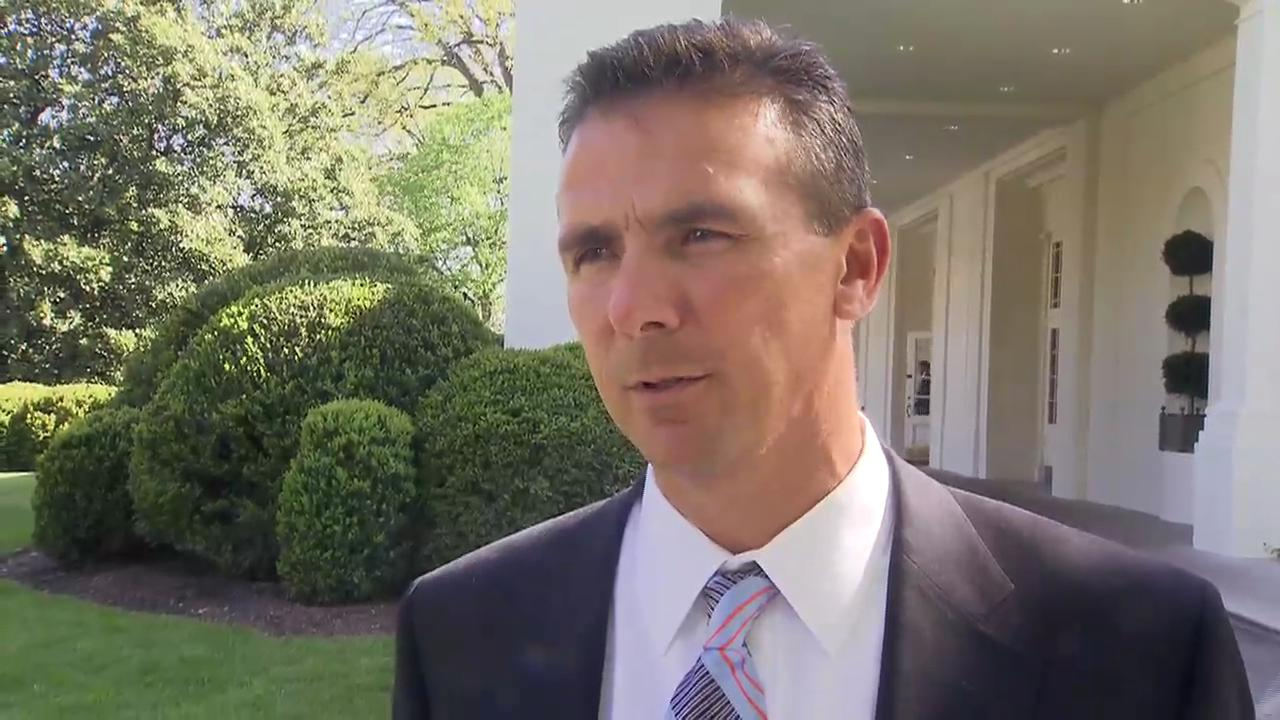
Coach Meyer

In 2001, Notre Dame wide receivers coach Urban Meyer took his first head coaching job at Bowling Green. In his first season there, the team finished 8–3, capping off the season with a 56–21 victory over Bowling Green's rival, the University of Toledo Rockets. Meyer also earned Mid-American Conference Coach of the Year honors that season.

The next year, Bowling Green finished with a 9–3 record. After a 17–6 overall record, Meyer left to accept the head coaching position at Utah. He helped turn around a team that had gone 2–9 in 2000 in large part due to QB Josh Harris, a player tailor-made for Meyer's scheme. In part-time play in 2001, Harris threw for 1,022 yards with 9 touchdowns, and ran for 600 yards and 8 touchdowns. The next year, he threw for 2,425 yards with 19 TD and ran for 737 yards with 20 TD. Meyer later used such quarterbacks as Alex Smith at Utah and Tim Tebow at Florida in a fashion similar to the way Meyer used Harris.

=== Gregg Brandon era (2003–2008) ===
After Meyer left for Utah, offensive coordinator Gregg Brandon was promoted to serve as the 16th head coach of the Falcons. In his first season as Bowling Green's head coach, Brandon led his team to an 11–3 record and a division title, appearing in the 2003 MAC title game, losing to Miami (OH). But the Falcons would play in the 2003 Motor City Bowl and win, finishing the season ranked at No. 23.While the next season was only good enough for 3rd in the MAC West, they finished 9–3 and played in the 2004 GMAC Bowl, the first time the Falcons went to consecutive bowl games since 1992.

They moved to the MAC East after the season, and finished the next two years 2nd and 4th respectively, with the latter being his only losing season at 4–8 in 2006. The following year, they shared the MAC East title while finishing 8–5, losing out on playing in the MAC title game due to a tiebreaker. Instead, they played in the 2007 GMAC Bowl. The 2008 season proved to be his final year in which they finished 6–6 after high expectations, being fired after his last game, a win against Toledo. Brandon finished 44–30, with two division titles but no MAC titles.

=== Dave Clawson era (2009–2013) ===
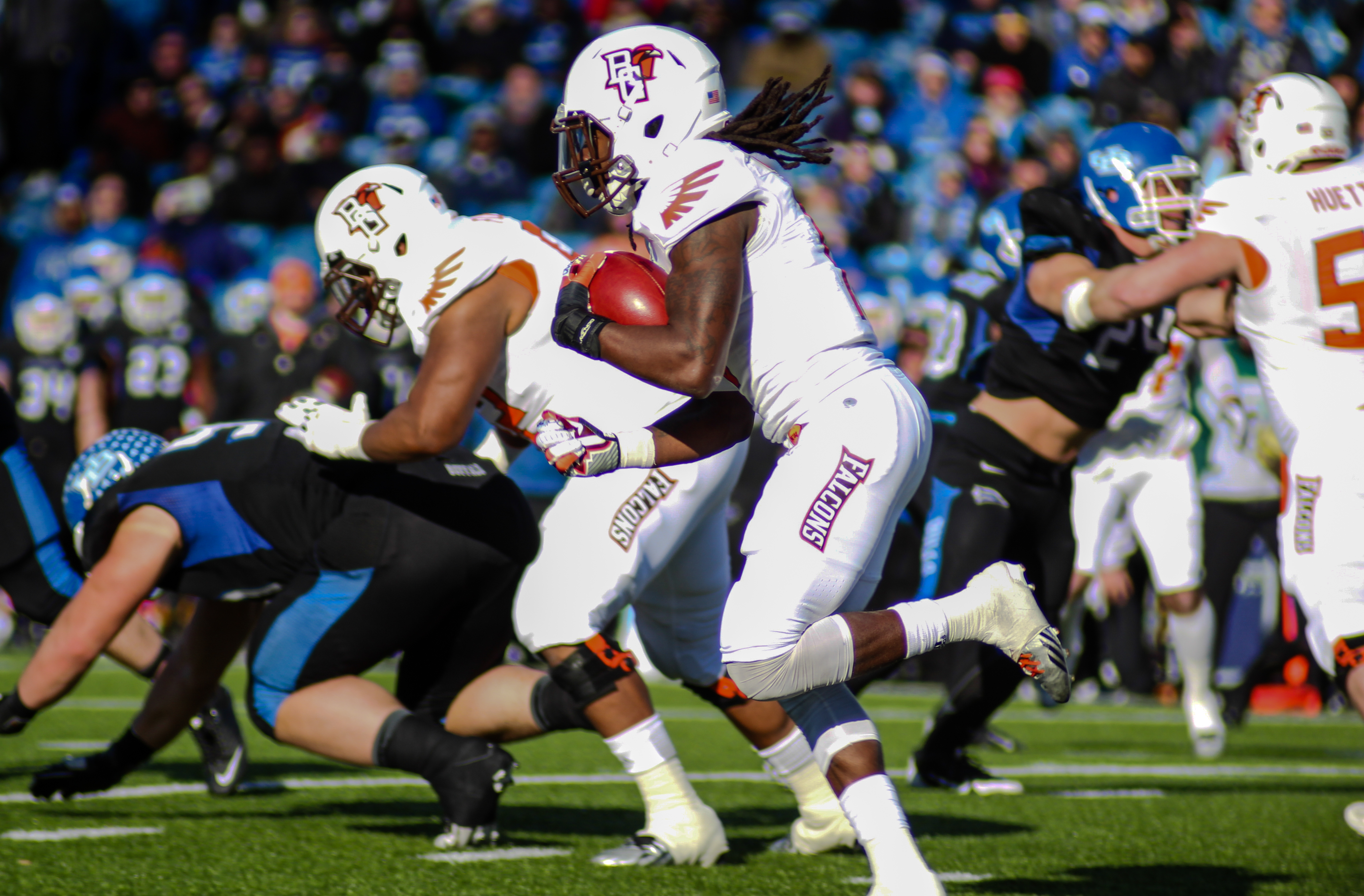
A Falcons football game in 2013

Dave Clawson had been offensive coordinator at Tennessee prior to being hired as the 17th head coach of the Falcons. His first year ended with a 7–6 record and a loss in the 2009 Humanitarian Bowl, though they played in their first bowl game in three seasons. 2010 was disastrous, as the team went 2–10. They improved to 5–7 the following year, with a marginal rise in division position.

In January 2010, rumors began to circulate that East Carolina was interested in Clawson for their vacant head coaching position, following former ECU coach Skip Holtz' move to South Florida. The rumors intensified following Middle Tennessee State's head coach Rick Stockstill turning down the East Carolina job after interviewing. However, Bowling Green stated that neither athletic director Greg Christopher or Clawson himself were contacted by East Carolina officials. Ultimately, Ruffin McNeill was hired to fill the position. On November 7, 2012, Clawson led the Falcons to an upset victory against division rival Ohio 26–14. The special teams had two blocked punts and forced two bad snaps which one of them rolled into Ohio's end zone to force a safety. The Falcons took advantage of these turnovers and scored 19 points (2 Touchdowns, 1 Field Goal, and 1 Safety). With the win, BG moved into 2nd place in the MAC East Division and kept their hopes alive of winning the MAC East and better yet the entire conference. They went to the 2012 Military Bowl after an 8–5 record, as expectations rose for next season. 2013 proved to be the culmination of the expectations, as the team not only won the MAC East, they also won the MAC title over Northern Illinois, their first MAC title since 1992. The team finished with a 10–4 record. Four days after winning the MAC title, Clawson left to be the next coach at Wake Forest, leaving the interim head coaching duties for the 2013 Little Caesars Pizza Bowl to special teams coordinator Adam Scheier. He left the program with a 32–31 record, a MAC title, but no bowl wins.

=== Dino Babers era (2014–2015) ===
Eastern Illinois head coach Dino Babers was hired as the 18th head football coach of the Falcons in December 2013. Babers is the first African American head coach in Bowling Green football history. Bowling Green went 8–4 in his first year with the program, winning the MAC East once again, though they lost the MAC title game to Northern Illinois, ending the regular season on a three-game losing streak. However, they did appear in the 2014 Camellia Bowl and won. It was their first bowl win since 2004. In 2015 Babers coached the team to a 10–4 record, winning the 2015 MAC Championship against Northern Illinois. Babers left the program in December 2015 to accept the head coaching position at Syracuse.

=== Mike Jinks era (2016–2018) ===
Texas Tech running backs coach Mike Jinks was hired to replace Babers on December 9, 2015. In Jinks' first season, the Falcons finished 4–8. In his second season, the Falcons only accomplished 2 wins to their 10 losses. In what would be his final season, the Jinks-led Falcons were 1–6 after falling to Western Michigan on October 13 after holding a two-touchdown lead with 8:51 left in the third quarter. Jinks was relieved of his duties on October 14, 2018, and finished his stint at Bowling Green with a 7–24 record. Carl Pelini was named interim head coach.

=== Scot Loeffler era (2019–2024) ===
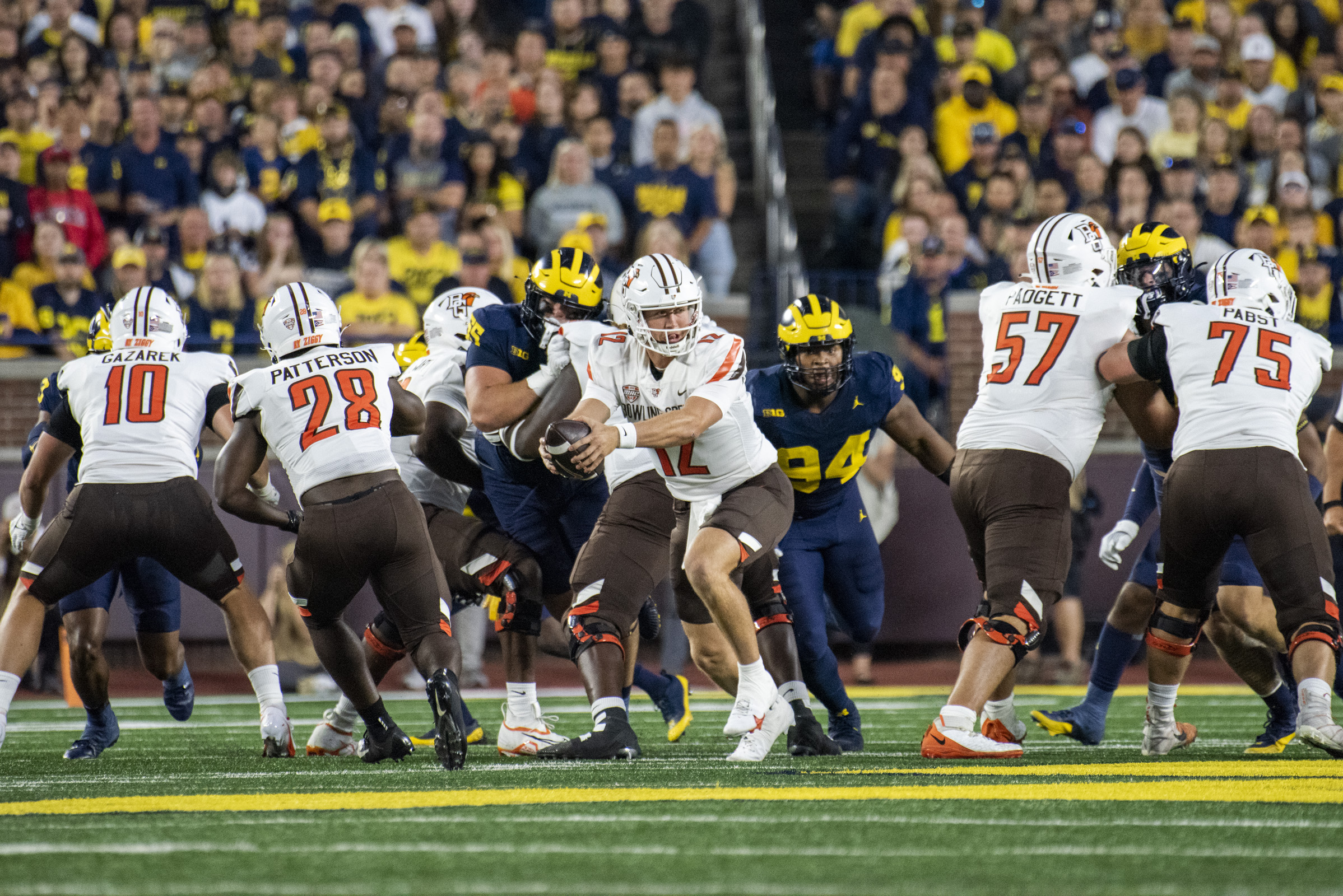
A Falcons football game in 2023

On November 28, 2018, Boston College offensive coordinator Scot Loeffler was named the 20th head coach at Bowling Green. During this time, the Falcons played their 100th anniversary game against the Toledo Rockets, winning 20–7. The Falcons were 27.5 point underdogs, and pulled off their first victory against Toledo since 2009. BG finished the year 3–9. In his second season, the Falcons didn't win a single game, going 0–5, in a shortened season due to the pandemic. Loeffler would pick up his biggest win as the head coach in 2021 when the Falcons beat the Minnesota Gophers 14–10 at Huntington Bank Stadium. The win would be Bowling Green's first win against an FBS team since 2019. Bowling Green would finish the season with a 4–8 record.

The Falcons finished with a 6–7 record in 2022. They began the season on the road with a 17–45 loss to UCLA. Bowling Green then lost to FCS opponent Eastern Kentucky in their longest game played with seven overtimes 57–59. The Falcons then defeated Marshall 34–31 in overtime the following week. Marshall had previously defeated #7 Notre Dame the week prior. Later in the season, the Falcons defeated Toledo 42–35 for their sixth win of the season. The victory earned the Falcons their first bowl game appearance since 2015. They faced New Mexico State in the 2022 Quick Lane Bowl.

In 2023, Loeffler's Falcons posted a 7–6 record. This was the Falcons first winning season since 2015. The 2023 season highlighted a non-conference 38–27 upset win against Georgia Tech and another Quick Lane Bowl invitation.

Loeffler left to take the Philadelphia Eagles quarterbacks coach positions following the completion of the 2024 season.

=== Eddie George era (2025–present) ===
On March 9, 2025, Eddie George, a College Football Hall of Fame running back at Ohio State and former NFL player, was hired as the Falcons' head coach. He had served the previous four season as head coach at Tennessee State.

During George's first season, the Falcons gained a social media star in the form of Pudge, a shorthair Persian cat owned by starting long snapper George Carlson. Carlson had brought Pudge to the Falcons' locker room after a 2025 preseason practice, and the team quickly took to the cat, making him an unofficial mascot and a regular locker-room visitor. Two team members posted videos of Pudge to social media sites, and the videos went viral. Since then, Pudge has been featured on the program's social media accounts, travels with the team and has a security detail, has a merchandise line, and has been gifted with packages of treats from major pet care brands.

== Conference affiliations ==
Bowling Green competes in the Mid-American Conference. Before the MAC eliminated football divisions ahead of the 2024 season, the Falcons had played in the East Division since 1997. Bowling Green was to move to the West division for the 2012 season, but that never occurred after Temple left the MAC for the Big East prior to the 2012 season.

- Independent (1919–1920)
- Northwest Ohio League (1921–1931)
- Independent (1932)
- Ohio Athletic Conference (1933–1941)
- Independent (1942–1951)
- Mid-American Conference (1952–present)

== Championships ==
=== National championships ===
Bowling Green was the small college national champion, as selected by the UPI in the 1959 small college football rankings, capping off a perfect season as the number one ranked team with a 13–9 victory over Ohio on November 21.

Year	Coach	Selectors	Record	Conference record
1959	Doyt Perry	AP, UPI	9–0	6–0

=== Conference championships ===
Bowling Green has won or shared a conference championship seventeen times, including twelve times in the Mid-American Conference.

Season	Conference	Head coach	Overall record	Conference record
1921	Northwest Ohio League	Earl Krieger	3–1–1	n/a
1922	Northwest Ohio League	Allen Snyder	4–2–1	n/a
1925	Northwest Ohio League	Warren Steller	3–1–3	n/a
1928	Northwest Ohio League	Warren Steller	5–0–2	n/a
1929†	Northwest Ohio League	Warren Steller	4–2–1	n/a
1956	Mid-American Conference	Doyt Perry	8–0–1	5–0–1
1959	Mid-American Conference	Doyt Perry	9–0	6–0
1961	Mid-American Conference	Doyt Perry	8–2	5–0–1
1962	Mid-American Conference	Doyt Perry	7–1–1	5–0–1
1964	Mid-American Conference	Doyt Perry	9–1	5–1
1965†	Mid-American Conference	Bob Gibson	7–2	5–1
1982	Mid-American Conference	Denny Stolz	7–5	7–2
1985	Mid-American Conference	Denny Stolz	11–1	9–0
1991	Mid-American Conference	Gary Blackney	11–1	8–0
1992	Mid-American Conference	Gary Blackney	10–2	8–0
2013	Mid-American Conference	Dave Clawson	10–3	7–1
2015	Mid-American Conference	Dino Babers	10–3	7–1

† Co-champions

=== Division championships ===
In the division era (1997–2023) of the MAC, Bowling Green won six division championships.

Year	Division	Coach	Opponent	CG result
2003	MAC West	Gregg Brandon	Miami (OH)	L 27–49
2005†	MAC East	Gregg Brandon	N/A lost tiebreaker to Akron	
2007†	MAC East	Gregg Brandon	N/A lost tiebreaker to Miami (OH)	
2013	MAC East	Dave Clawson	Northern Illinois	W 47–27
2014	MAC East	Dino Babers	Northern Illinois	L 17–51
2015	MAC East	Dino Babers	Northern Illinois	W 34–14

† Co-champions

== Bowl games ==
Bowling Green has played in 15 bowl games in its history, compiling a record of 5–10 in those games.

Date	Bowl	Opponent	Result
1982	California Bowl	Fresno State	L 28–29
1985	California Bowl	Fresno State	L 7–51
1991	California Bowl	Fresno State	W 28–21
1992	Las Vegas Bowl	Nevada	W 35–34
2003	Motor City Bowl	Northwestern	W 28–24
2004	GMAC Bowl	Memphis	W 52–35
2007	GMAC Bowl	Tulsa	L 7–63
2009	Humanitarian Bowl	Idaho	L 42–43
2012	Military Bowl	San Jose State	L 20–29
2013	Little Caesars Bowl	Pittsburgh	L 27–30
2014	Camellia Bowl	South Alabama	W 33–28
2015	GoDaddy Bowl	Georgia Southern	L 27–58
2022	Quick Lane Bowl	New Mexico State	L 19–24
2023	Quick Lane Bowl	Minnesota	L 24–30
2024	68 Ventures Bowl	Arkansas State	L 31–38

The Falcons also participated in the Mercy Bowl on November 23, 1961, against the Fresno State Bulldogs (losing 36–6) though this game is not recognized as a sanctioned bowl game by the NCAA.

== Head coaches ==
Head coaches through 2024 season.

Coach	Tenure	Seasons	Record	Pct.	Conf. record	Pct.	Conf. titles	Bowl games	National titles
John Stitt	1919	1	0–3	.000	–	–	–	–	0
Walt Jean	1920	1	1–4	.200	–	–	–	–	0
Earl Krieger	1921	1	3–1–1	.700	3–0	1.000	1	–	0
Allen Snyder	1922	1	4–2–1	.643	2–0–1	.833	1	–	0
Ray B. McCandless	1923	1	3–5	.375	2–2	.500	0	–	0
Warren Steller	1924–1934	11	40–21–19	.619	3–6–4	.385	3	–	0
Harry Ockerman	1935–1940	6	20–19–9	.510	12–15–8	.457	0	–	0
Robert Whittaker	1941–1954	14	66–50–7	.565	7–13–2	.364	0	0	0
Doyt Perry	1955–1964	10	77–11–5	.855	46–9–5	.808	5	1	1
Bob Gibson	1965–1967	3	19–9–0	.679	11–7	.611	1	0	0
Don Nehlen	1968–1976	9	53–35–4	.598	27–20–2	.571	0	0	0
Denny Stolz	1977–1985	9	56–45–1	.553	49–26–1	.651	2	2	0
Moe Ankney	1986–1990	5	20–31–3	.398	18–19–1	.487	0	0	0
Gary Blackney	1991–2000	10	60–50–2	.540	47–31–2	.600	2	2	0
Urban Meyer	2001–2002	2	17–6	.739	11–5	.688	0	0	0
Gregg Brandon	2003–2008	6	44–30	.595	31–17	.633	0	3	0
Dave Clawson	2009–2013	5	32–31	.508	24–17	.585	1	3	0
Dino Babers	2014–2015	2	18–9	.667	12–4	.750	1	2	0
Mike Jinks	2016–2018	3	7–24	.226	5–14	.263	0	0	0
Scot Loeffler	2019–2024	6	27–38	.415	20–25	.444	0	3	0
Eddie George	2025–present	1	4–8	.333	2–6	.250	0	0	0

== Rivalries ==
Bowling Green plays the Toledo Rockets for the Peace Pipe in the annual Battle of I-75. Bowling Green's record in games played for the Peace Pipe, which date to 1980, is 15–16. Bowling Green competes against Kent State for the Anniversary Award', which was introduced in 1985.

=== Kent State ===
Bowling Green leads the series with Kent State 62–24–6 through the 2024 season.

=== Toledo ===
Bowling Green and Toledo have a rivalry, nicknamed "The Battle of I-75", dating back to 1924, when BGSU challenged the participation of Toledo's captain, Gilbert Stick, after it was discovered that Stick also played for a local team in Genoa, Ohio. Conference rules did not prohibit such play, and BGSU's protest was overruled. In 1950, Toledo's athletic director charged BGSU students a higher price for tickets at a basketball game than the general public, while rumors spread of a dog-napping attempt by BGSU against Toledo's mascot. Another incident came in 1951, when a fight broke out after a hard hit by a BGSU player on fullback Mel Triplett. Don Greenwood, then Toledo's coach, participated, and resigned after the university failed to back him up. In Greenwood's view, the officials should have called a penalty for excessive roughness, and he had a duty to protect his players. After the 2026 series matchup, Toledo leads 44–43–4.

== Home venues ==
- Ridge Street School (1919–1923)
- University Stadium (1923–1965)
- Doyt Perry Stadium (1966–present)

== Retired numbers ==
The Falcons have retired only one number.

Bowling Green Falcons retired numbers
No.	Player	Pos.	Tenure	Ref.
29	Paul Miles	RB	1970–1973	

== Notable individual award winners ==
=== Mid-American Conference honors ===
- Vern Smith Leadership Award (Player of the Year)

1984: Brian McClure
1985: Brian McClure (2)
1991: Erik White
1992: Erik White (2)
2015: Matt Johnson
2024: Harold Fannin Jr.

- Offensive Player of the Year

1973: Paul Miles
1983: Brian McClure
1984: Brian McClure (2)
1985: Brian McClure (3)
1991: Erik White
1992: Erik White (2)
2004: Omar Jacobs
2015: Matt Johnson
2024: Harold Fannin Jr.

- Defensive Player of the Year

1970: Phil Villapiano (tie)
1969: Joe Green
1993: Vince Palko
1994: Vince Palko (2)
2012: Chris Jones

- Freshman of the Year

1982: Brian McClure
1998: Kurt Gerling
2011: Anthon Samuel

- Coach of the Year

1982: Denny Stolz
1985: Denny Stolz (2)
1991: Gary Blackney
1992: Gary Blackney (2)
2001: Urban Meyer

== Future non-conference opponents ==
Announced schedules as of October 13, 2026.

2027	2028	2029	2030	2031	2035
at Ohio State (8/28)	at South Carolina (8/26)	at Michigan (8/25)	at South Florida (9/14)	at Old Dominion (9/13)	at Louisiana Tech (9/22)
at Iowa State (9/4)	at Minnesota (9/9)	at Tennessee (9/15)			
Mercyhurst (9/18)	at South Alabama (9/16)				
at Marshall (9/25)					

== Bowling Green's All-time players in the NFL ==
- Art Mergenthal, G — 1945–1946 Cleveland Rams
- Mike Patanelli, DE — 1947 Brooklyn Dodgers
- Bob Schnelker, End, 1953 Philadelphia Eagles, 1954–1960 New York Giants, 1961 Minnesota Vikings, 1961 Pittsburgh Steelers
- Jim Ladd, End, 1954 Chicago Cardinals
- Ken Russell, OT — 1957–1959 Detroit Lions
- Karl Koepfer, OT — 1958 Detroit Lions
- Larry Baker, OT — 1960 New York Titans
- Bernie Casey, FL — 1961–1966 San Francisco 49ers, 1967–1968 Los Angeles Rams
- Don Lisbon, RB — 1963–1964 San Francisco 49ers
- Bob Reynolds, OT — 1963–1971, 1973 St. Louis Cardinals, 1972–1973 New England Patriots
- Ed Bettridge, LB — 1964 Cleveland Browns
- Jay Cunningham, CB — 1965–1967 Boston Patriots
- Jerry Jones, T-DE-DT — 1966–1967 Atlanta Falcons, 1968–1969 New Orleans Saints
- Heath Wingate, C — 1967 Washington Redskins
- Mike Weger, CB — 1967–1975 Detroit Lions, 1976–1977 Houston Oilers
- Jamie Rivers, LB — 1968–1973 St. Louis Cardinals, 1974–1975 New York Jets
- Joe Green, CB — 1970–1971 New York Giants
- Phil Villapiano, LB — 1971–1979 Oakland Raiders, 1980–1983 Buffalo Bills
- Fred Sturt, G — 1974 Washington Redskins, 1976–1978 New England Patriots, 1978–1981 New Orleans Saints
- Roger Wallace, WR — 1976 New York Giants
- Tom Moriarty, CB — 1977–1979, 1981 Atlanta Falcons, 1981 Pittsburgh Steelers
- Mark Miller, QB — 1978–1979 Cleveland Browns
- Dave Preston, RB — 1978–1983 Denver Broncos
- Dough Smith, C-G-T — 1978–1991 Los Angeles Rams
- Jeff Groth, WR — 1979 Miami Dolphins, 1979–1980 Houston Oilers, 1981–1985 New Orleans Saints
- Mike Obrovac, OT — 1981–1983 Cincinnati Bengals
- Martin Bayless, CB — 1984 St. Louis Cardinals, 1984–1986 Buffalo Bills, 1987–1991 San Diego Chargers, 1992–1993, 1995–1996 Kansas City Chiefs, 1994 Washington Redskins
- Vince Villanucci, NT — 1987 Green Bay Packers
- Stuart Tolle, NT — 1987 Detroit Lions
- Tim Ross, LB — 1987 Detroit Lions
- Mark Nelson, OT — 1987 Kansas City Chiefs
- Greg Meehan, WR — 1987 Cincinnati Bengals
- Brian McClure, QB — 1987 Buffalo Bills
- Stan Hunter, WR — 1987 New York Jets
- Mike Estep, OT — 1987 Green Bay Packers, Buffalo Bills
- Sean Dykes, CB — 1987 New York Jets
- Kyle Kramer, CB — 1989 Cleveland Browns
- Reggie Thornton, WR — 1991 Indianapolis Colts, 1993 Cincinnati Bengals
- Carlos Brooks, CB — 1995 Arizona Cardinals
- Charlie Williams, CB — 1995–2000 Dallas Cowboys
- Kevin O'Neill, LB — 1998–2000 Detroit Lions
- Khary Campbell, MLB — 2002–2003 New York Jets, 2004–2008 Washington Redskins, 2009 Houston Texans
- Brandon Hicks, DT — 2003 Indianapolis Colts
- Scott Mruczkowski, C — 2005–2011 San Diego Chargers
- Shaun Suisham K — 2005–2006, 2009 Dallas Cowboys, 2006–2009 Washington Redskins, 2010–2014 Pittsburgh Steelers
- P.J. Pope, RB— 2006 Green Bay Packers, 2008 Denver Broncos
- Steve Sanders, WR — 2008 Cleveland Browns
- Kory Lichtensteiger, C — 2008 Denver Broncos, 2010–2016 Washington Redskins
- Diyral Briggs, LB — 2009–2010 San Francisco 49ers, 2010 Denver Broncos, Green Bay Packers
- Chris Jones, DT — 2013–2014 New England Patriots, 2016 Miami Dolphins, San Francisco 49ers
- Alex Bayer, TE — 2014 St. Louis Rams
- Jude Adjei-Barimah, CB — 2015–2016 Tampa Bay Buccaneers
- Gabe Martin, LB — 2015–2017 Arizona Cardinals
- Roger Lewis, WR — 2016–2017 New York Giants
- Gehrig Dieter, WR — 2018–2020 Kansas City Chiefs
- Ryan Hunter, OT — 2019 Kansas City Chiefs
- **Scotty Miller, WR — 2019–2022 Tampa Bay Buccaneers, 2023 Atlanta Falcons, 2024–present Pittsburgh Steelers**
- **Quintin Morris, TE — 2021–2024 Buffalo Bills, 2025–present Jacksonville Jaguars**
- **Karl Brooks, DL — 2023–present Green Bay Packers**
- **Connor Bazelak, QB – 2025–present Tampa Bay Buccaneers**
- **Harold Fannin Jr., TE – 2025–present Cleveland Browns**

All players in bold are current NFL players.

== Notable players ==
- Freddie Barnes
- Connor Bazelak
- Shawn Daniels
- Jack Harbaugh
- Josh Harris
- Omar Jacobs
- Matt Johnson
- Kamar Jorden
- Paul Miles
- Kendall Montgomery
- James Morgan
- Kevin O'Brien
- Robert Redd
- Teo Redding
- Cris Shale
- Charles Sharon
- Tyler Sheehan
- Erik White
- Diyral Briggs
- Harold Fannin Jr.
