= 2004 GMAC Bowl =

Bowling Green Falcons	Memphis Tigers
(8–3)	(8–3)
MAC	C-USA
52	35
Head coach: Gregg Brandon	Head coach: Tommy West
	1	2	3	4	Total
Bowling Green	21	14	7	10	52
Memphis	7	21	0	7	35
- Date: December 22, 2004
- Season: 2004
- Stadium: Ladd–Peebles Stadium
- Location: Mobile, Alabama
- MVP: Bowling Green QB Omar Jacobs
- Referee: Jim Lapetina (Big Ten)
- Attendance: 29,500

United States TV coverage
- Network: ESPN
- Announcers: Mark Jones (Play-by-Play); Bob Davie (Analyst); Holly Rowe (Sidelines)

The 2004 GMAC Bowl was an American college football bowl game. It was part of the 2004 NCAA Division I-A football season, and was the 6th edition. It was played in December 2004, and featured the Memphis Tigers, and the Bowling Green Falcons.

== Game recap ==
Before the game, heavy rains soaked the field and continued through almost the whole game. Running back PJ Pope scored on a 1-yard touchdown run, to give Bowling Green an early 7–0 lead. Quarterback Omar Jacobs threw an 18-yard touchdown pass to wide receiver Charles Sharon, stretching the lead out to 14–0. Memphis's quarterback Danny Wimprine threw a 42-yard touchdown pass to John Doucette to cut the lead to 14–7. Omar Jacobs again hooked up with Charlie Sharon, this time on a 36-yard touchdown pass to gain a 21–7 lead after the 1st quarter.

In the second quarter, Danny Wimprine found wide receiver Chris Kelly for a 61-yard touchdown pass, to get within 21–14. Omar Jacobs found Steve Sanders for a 31-yard touchdown pass to extend the lead to 28–14. Danny Wimprine found Maurice Avery for a 38-yard touchdown pass, and the lead was 28–21. DeAngelo Williams later scored on a 31-yard touchdown run to tie the game at 28.

Before halftime, Omar Jacobs found Steve Sanders again, this time for a 17-yard touchdown pass to regain the lead at 35–28. In the third quarter, he threw a 13-yard touchdown pass to PJ Pope, to extend the lead to 42–28. A Shaun Suisham field goal increased the lead to 45–28. A PJ Pope touchdown run in the fourth quarter increased the lead to 52–28. John Doucette scored on a 14-yard touchdown pass from Danny Wimprine, to make the final score 52–35.
