= Joe Green (American football) =

American football player (born 1948)

No. 33
- Position: Defensive back

Personal information
- Born: November 20, 1948 (age 77); Aberdeen, Mississippi, U.S.
- Listed height: 5 ft 11 in (1.80 m)
- Listed weight: 195 lb (88 kg)

Career information
- High school: Toledo (OH) Scott
- College: Bowling Green
- NFL draft: 1970: undrafted

Career history
- New York Giants (1970–1971)

Awards and highlights
- MAC Defensive Player of the Year (1969)
- Stats at Pro Football Reference

Joseph David Green (born November 20, 1948) is an American former professional football player who was a defensive back and return specialist for the New York Giants of the National Football League (NFL). He played college football for the Bowling Green Falcons, earing Mid-American Conference Defensive Player of the Year honors in 1969 as a senior. He was undrafted in 1970 and picked up that year by the Giants. Green played for the Giants for two seasons, and returned seven kickoffs for 132 yards. He started in two games on defense in 1971, and recorded the only touchdown of his pro career that year as he returned a fumble for a score against the Green Bay Packers. He is the father of former NFL player Barrett Green.
