= 2009 Bowling Green Falcons football team =

American college football season

2009 Bowling Green Falcons football

Humanitarian Bowl, L 42–43 vs. Idaho
- Conference: Mid-American Conference
- East
- Record: 7–6 (6–2 MAC)
- Head coach: Dave Clawson (1st season)
- Offensive coordinator: Warren Ruggiero (1st season)
- Defensive coordinator: Shannon Morrison
- Home stadium: Doyt Perry Stadium (23,724)

2009 Mid-American Conference football standings
	Conf.			Overall
Team	W		L	W		L
East Division
Ohio xy	7	–	1	9	–	5
Temple x	7	–	1	9	–	4
Bowling Green	6	–	2	7	–	6
Kent State	4	–	4	5	–	7
Buffalo	3	–	5	5	–	7
Akron	2	–	6	3	–	9
Miami (OH)	1	–	7	1	–	11
West Division
No. 23 Central Michigan x$	8	–	0	12	–	2
Northern Illinois	5	–	3	7	–	6
Western Michigan	4	–	4	5	–	7
Toledo	3	–	5	5	–	7
Ball State	2	–	6	2	–	10
Eastern Michigan	0	–	8	0	–	12
Championship: Central Michigan 20, Ohio 10
$ – Conference champion; x – Division champion/co-champions; y – Championship game participant; Rankings from AP Poll

The 2009 Bowling Green Falcons football team represented Bowling Green State University during the 2009 NCAA Division I FBS football season. They were led by first-year head coach Dave Clawson and played in the East Division of the Mid-American Conference. They played their home games at Doyt Perry Stadium. They finished the season 7–6, 6–2 in MAC play to finish in third place in the East Division. They were invited to the Humanitarian Bowl where they lost to Idaho.

== Preseason ==
=== Coaching changes ===
On November 28, 2008, athletic director Greg Christopher announced that head coach Gregg Brandon had been fired after six seasons and 44–30 record, including a 31–18 conference record, which was the best of any MAC coach since 2003 and led the team to three bowl games (2–1) and shares of two East division championships. Christopher stated that a culmination of on and off the field events led to Brandon's dismissal, nine months after Brandon received a three-year contract extension. The on-field problems included the Falcons 6–6 record, which was very disappointing as the Falcons were favored to win the MAC East division, and a 1–4 home record which included losses to Miami (OH) and Eastern Michigan (who finished 2–10 and 3–9 respectively) and a 40–34 double-overtime loss to eventual MAC Champion Buffalo, after the Falcons led the game by 20 points entering the fourth quarter and gave up two touchdowns within the final three minutes of the game. Off the field, eleven Falcons players found themselves in legal troubles, two of which were arrested on drug trafficking charges. The program was also stripped of nine scholarships by the NCAA because of inadequate grades on the association's Academic Progress Report. Christopher stated that Brandon's post-game tirade about the lack of student support and attendance after the Buffalo loss, did not factor into his decision to release the coach.

On December 7, 2008, the Falcons lost two valuable coaches to rival Toledo, as defensive coordinator Mike Ward and co-offensive coordinator Matt Campbell were brought to the Rockets by new head coach (and former BG assistant) Tim Beckman. The two assistants left, because they were not guaranteed contracts after Gregg Brandon was fired. Ward was a very influential tool in recruiting and a few recruits were expected to rescind their verbals to Bowling Green, because of his departure.

On December 12, 2008, athletic director Greg Christopher named Dave Clawson as the program's 17th head coach. Clawson, served the previous season with Tennessee as the Volunteers' offensive coordinator and had been the head coach at Fordham and Richmond, winning three conference championships and two Div. I-FCS Coach of the Year awards. Others that were considered for the job included former Oklahoma State defensive coordinator Tim Beckman (now head coach at Toledo), Ohio State defensive coordinator Luke Fickell, former Florida offensive coordinator Dan Mullen (now head coach at the University of Florida), Louisville defensive coordinator Ron English, LSU offensive line coach Greg Studrawa, Central Michigan assistant Zach Azzani, Missouri defensive coordinator Matt Eberflus and Purdue defensive coordinator Brock Spack

On January 27, 2009, Clawson announced eight additions to his coaching staff for the upcoming season. The list included Shannon Morrison and Joe Trainer hired as co-defensive coordinators, Warren Ruggerio as offensive coordinator, John Hunter as running backs coach, John McDonnell as offensive line coach, Doug Philips as defensive ends coach, Sean Spencer as defensive tackles coach and special teams coordinator, and Clint Dowdle as director of football operations. A month after being introduced as co-defensive coordinator, Joe Trainer left the Falcons to become head coach at Rhode Island, a school that he was previously an assistant and defensive coordinator.

On February 2, 2009, quarterbacks coach Jim Hofher left the Falcons to become offensive coordinator at Delaware.

=== Key losses ===
Clawson dismissed Senior defensive lineman Michael Ream for an undisclosed violation of team rules in April. Ream, who had been suspended in 2007 due to violating team rules, was to be the only senior on Bowling Green's defensive line. When asked about the dismissal, Clawson stated "We are disappointed that we had to take this step, but when a student-athlete makes a poor decision, he must live with the consequences of his decision."

The following are some of the key players (all but Ream having graduated) who will be no longer eligible to play in the 2009 season:

Offense:

- Brandon Curtis (OL)
- Jeff Fink (OL)
- Jermiah Kelley (WR)
- Aaron Kent (OL)
- Marques Parks (WR)
- Corey Partridge (WR)
- Eric Ransom (RB)
- Anthony Turner (RB)

Defense:

- Adrian Baker (DE)
- Diyral Briggs (DL)
- Nick Davis (DL)
- Erique Dozier (LB)
- Giovanni Fillari (DB)
- John Haneline (LB)
- Kenny Lewis (DB)
- Michael Ream (DL)*†
- Joe Schaefer (DL)
- Antonio Smith (DB)
- Nate Waldron (LB)
- Freddie Walker (DB)

Special Teams:

- Sinisa Vrvillo (K)

*-Underclassman †-Dismissed from team

=== Recruiting ===
College recruiting information (2009)
Name	Hometown	School	Height	Weight	40^{‡}	Commit date
Dylan Farrington; DE	Adrian, MI	Adrian HS	6 ft 5 in (1.96 m)	230 lb (100 kg)	4.65	Jan 22, 2009
Dylan Farrington; DE	Recruit ratings: Scout: Rivals:					
Matthew Schilz; QB	Sierra Madre, CA	Maranatha HS	6 ft 3 in (1.91 m)	200 lb (91 kg)	–	Jan 5, 2009
Matthew Schilz; QB	Recruit ratings: Scout: Rivals:					
Ali Alaboody; RB	Dearborn, MI	Fordson HS	5 ft 8 in (1.73 m)	180 lb (82 kg)	4.41	Jul 20, 2008
Ali Alaboody; RB	Recruit ratings: Scout: Rivals:					
Alex Bayer; TE	Pickerington, OH	Pickerington HS North	6 ft 4 in (1.93 m)	226 lb (103 kg)	4.8	Jun 12, 2008
Alex Bayer; TE	Recruit ratings: Scout: Rivals:					
Kyle Bryant; OT	Detroit, MI	Southeastern HS	6 ft 5 in (1.96 m)	290 lb (130 kg)	5.3	Jan 25, 2009
Kyle Bryant; OT	Recruit ratings: Scout: Rivals:					
Jarius Campbell; DE	Pickerington, OH	Pickerington HS North	6 ft 5 in (1.96 m)	237 lb (108 kg)	4.78	Jul 13, 2008
Jarius Campbell; DE	Recruit ratings: Scout: Rivals:					
Austin Collier; QB	Standish, MI	Standish-Sterling Central HS	6 ft 1 in (1.85 m)	190 lb (86 kg)	4.6	Jun 28, 2008
Austin Collier; QB	Recruit ratings: Scout: Rivals:					
Aunre' Davis; CB	Warren, OH	Warren G. Harding HS	5 ft 11 in (1.80 m)	170 lb (77 kg)	4.6	Jan 27, 2009
Aunre' Davis; CB	Recruit ratings: Scout: Rivals:					
Erique Geiger; RB	Huber Heights, OH	Wayne HS	5 ft 8 in (1.73 m)	210 lb (95 kg)	4.53	Feb 4, 2009
Erique Geiger; RB	Recruit ratings: Scout: Rivals:					
Vince German; FB	Newark, OH	Licking Valley HS	6 ft 2 in (1.88 m)	230 lb (100 kg)	–	Feb 4, 2009
Vince German; FB	Recruit ratings: Scout: Rivals:					
Ronnie Goble; ATH	Canton, MI	Plymouth Canton HS	6 ft 3 in (1.91 m)	220 lb (100 kg)	4.7	Nov 22, 2008
Ronnie Goble; ATH	Recruit ratings: Scout: Rivals:					
Jordan Hopgood; WR	Cincinnati, OH	Princeton HS	5 ft 11 in (1.80 m)	185 lb (84 kg)	4.4	Jan 16, 2009
Jordan Hopgood; WR	Recruit ratings: Scout: Rivals:					
Chris Jones; DT	Brownsburg, IN	Brownsburg HS	6 ft 2 in (1.88 m)	270 lb (120 kg)	–	Jan 18, 2009
Chris Jones; DT	Recruit ratings: Scout: Rivals:					
Eric Jordan; MLB	Sandusky, OH	Sandusky HS	6 ft 1 in (1.85 m)	215 lb (98 kg)	–	Jul 8, 2008
Eric Jordan; MLB	Recruit ratings: Scout: Rivals:					
Mark Mays; RB	Clayton, OH	Northmont HS	5 ft 9 in (1.75 m)	170 lb (77 kg)	–	Jul 13, 2008
Mark Mays; RB	Recruit ratings: Scout: Rivals:					
Tim Moore; S	Mentor, OH	Mentor HS	5 ft 11 in (1.80 m)	185 lb (84 kg)	–	Feb 4, 2009
Tim Moore; S	Recruit ratings: Scout: Rivals:					
Ted Ouellet; DE	Dover, MA	Dover-Sherborn Regional HS	6 ft 3 in (1.91 m)	250 lb (110 kg)	4.84	Jan 5, 2009
Ted Ouellet; DE	Recruit ratings: Scout: Rivals:					
John Pettigrew; RB	Cuyahoga Falls, OH	Cuyahoga Valley Christian Academy	5 ft 9 in (1.75 m)	180 lb (82 kg)	4.5	Feb 4, 2009
John Pettigrew; RB	Recruit ratings: Scout: Rivals:					
Jordan Roussos; DT	Carnegie, PA	Carlynton Jr/Sr HS	6 ft 4 in (1.93 m)	240 lb (110 kg)	4.75	Jan 21, 2009
Jordan Roussos; DT	Recruit ratings: Scout: Rivals:					
Paul Swan; WLB	Oconomowoc, WI	Oconomowoc HS	6 ft 1 in (1.85 m)	212 lb (96 kg)	4.7	Jul 2, 2008
Paul Swan; WLB	Recruit ratings: Scout: Rivals:					
Alex Thomas; LB	Stow, OH	Stow-Munroe Falls HS	6 ft 3 in (1.91 m)	230 lb (100 kg)	4.75	Sep 30, 2008
Alex Thomas; LB	Recruit ratings: Scout: Rivals:					
Dwayne Woods; MLB	Cincinnati, OH	Princeton HS	5 ft 11 in (1.80 m)	209 lb (95 kg)	–	Aug 8, 2008
Dwayne Woods; MLB	Recruit ratings: Scout: Rivals:					
Overall recruit ranking:
‡ Refers to 40-yard dash; Note: In many cases, Scout, Rivals, 247Sports, On3, and ESPN may conflict in their listings of height, weight and 40 time.; In these cases, the average was taken. ESPN grades are on a 100-point scale.; Sources: "Bowling Green Commit List for 2009". Rivals.; "Bowling Green: Commits". Scout.; "Scout.com Team Recruiting Rankings". Scout.; "2009 Team Ranking". Rivals.com.

== Schedule ==
Date	Time	Opponent	Site	TV	Result	Attendance
September 3	7:00pm	Troy*	Doyt Perry Stadium; Bowling Green, OH	BCSN	W 31–14	14,514
September 12	7:00pm	at No. 25 Missouri*	Faurot Field; Columbia, MO		L 20–27	65,401
September 19	7:00pm	at Marshall*	Joan C. Edwards Stadium; Huntington, WV		L 10–17	23,029
September 26	7:00pm	No. 8 Boise State*	Doyt Perry Stadium; Bowling Green, OH	ESPN360	L 14–49	22,396
October 3	4:00pm	Ohio	Doyt Perry Stadium; Bowling Green, OH		L 37–44	14,071
October 10	3:30pm	at Kent State	Dix Stadium; Kent, OH (Battle for the Anniversary Award)	Fox Sports Ohio	W 36–35	15,211
October 17	12:00pm	at Ball State	Scheumann Stadium; Muncie, IN		W 31–17	10,192
October 24	12:00pm	Central Michigan	Doyt Perry Stadium; Bowling Green, OH	ESPN Plus	L 10–24	10,042
November 3	7:00pm	at Buffalo	University at Buffalo Stadium; Buffalo, NY	ESPN2	W 30–29	13,202
November 12	6:00pm	at Miami (OH)	Yager Stadium; Oxford, OH		W 35–14	8,935
November 20	5:30pm	Akron	Doyt Perry Stadium; Bowling Green, OH	ESPNU	W 36–20	9,163
November 27	2:00pm	Toledo	Doyt Perry Stadium; Bowling Green, OH (Peace Pipe Trophy)	BCSN	W 38–24	14,075
December 30	4:30pm	vs. Idaho	Bronco Stadium; Boise, ID (Humanitarian Bowl)	ESPN	L 42–43	26,726
*Non-conference game; Rankings from Coaches' Poll released prior to the game; All times are in Eastern time

== Roster ==
(as of 09/06/2009)
Wide receivers: 2 Ray Hutson – (redshirt) sophomore; 3 Chris Scheidt – sophomore; 6 Calvin Wiley – (redshirt) senior; 7 Freddie Barnes – (redshirt) senior; 8 Tyrone Pronty – senior; 9 Adrian Hodges – (redshirt) sophomore; 12 Chris Wright – senior; 19 Kamar Jorden – junior; 80 Austin Collier – freshman; 80 Justus Jones – freshman; 82 Jordan Hopgood – freshman; 83 Sean Joplin – freshman; 84 Derek Brighton – (redshirt) junior; Offensive line: 56 Tyler Donahue – (redshirt) junior; 60 Casey McHugh – (redshirt) junior; 61 Ben Bojicic – (redshirt) sophomore; 62 Preston Burrell – (redshirt) sophomore; 64 Scott Albert – (redshirt) senior; 65 Kyle Bryant – freshman; 66 Ricky Retzinger – freshman; 67 James Garnett – (redshirt); 68 Scott Lewis – sophomore; 69 Marc Stevens – (redshirt) freshman; 70 Brady Minturn – (redshirt) senior; 71 Chip Robinson – (redshirt) freshman; 75 Shane Steffy – (redshirt) senior; 77 Blaec Walker – (redshirt) freshman; 79 Tim German – (redshirt) freshman; Tight ends: 36 Lewis Parks – (redshirt) junior; 44 Nick Rieke – (redshirt) junior; 81 DeMark Jenkins – (redshirt) freshman; 85 Chris Paliska – freshman; 87 Alex Bayer – freshman; 89 Jimmy Scheidler – (redshirt) senior; 95 Sheldon Hall – freshman; Fullbacks: 40 Vince German – freshman	Quarterbacks: 11 Matt Schilz – freshman; 13 Tyler Sheehan – senior; 14 Kellen Pagel – freshman; 14 Aaron Pankratz – (redshirt) freshman; 16 Tony Hunter – (redshirt) senior; 18 Bart Tanski – freshman; Running backs: 1 Willie Geter – junior; 20 John Pettigrew – freshman; 22 Jason Rice – sophomore; 28 Steven Dunlap – freshman; 30 Mark Mays – freshman; 33 Chris Bullock – (redshirt) senior; 34 Zach Akenberger – sophomore; 37 Erique Geiger – freshman; Defensive line: 50 Winston Etheridge – (redshirt) freshman; 55 Angelo Magnone – (redshirt) junior; 58 Jarius Campbell – freshman; 58 Micky Wagner – sophomore; 59 Jordon Roussos – freshman; 72 Nick Torresso – junior; 76 Jake Thompson – freshman; 88 Nick Tuminello – (redshirt) freshman; 90 Dylan Farrington – freshman; 91 Chris Jones – freshman; 92 Kevin Alvarado – (redshirt) sophomore; 93 Ted Ouellet – freshman; 94 Carlos Tipton – (redshirt) junior; 96 Ronnie Goble – freshman; 97 Darius Smith – (redshirt) junior; 98 Andrew Johnson – (redshirt) sophomore	Linebackers: 4 Jerett Sanderson – senior; 35 Ryan Crow – junior; 42 Eugene Fells – (redshirt) junior; 43 Brandon Jackson – senior; 45 Cody Basler – (redshirt) senior; 47 Dwayne Woods – freshman; 51 Anthony Lawson – freshman; 51 Paul W. Swan – (redshirt) freshman; 52 James Schneider – senior; 53 Alex Thomas – freshman; 54 Eric Jordan – freshman; 57 Neal Dahlman – junior; Defensive backs: 5 P.J. Mahone – senior; 10 Calvin Marshall – (redshirt) junior; 15 Lane Robilotto – (redshirt) freshman; 17 Marquese Quiles – (redshirt) freshman; 21 Adrien Spencer – freshman; 23 Robert Lorenzi – (redshirt) junior; 24 Jahmal Brown – senior; 25 Jonathan Davis – (redshirt) freshman; 27 Giovanni Fillari – senior; 28 Cameron Truss – freshman; 31 Roger Williams – senior; 32 Jerrel Parks – junior; 32 Keith Morgan – sophomore; 38 Aunre' Davis – freshman; 41 Tim Moore – freshman; Kickers: 26 Nick Iovinelli – senior; 39 Matthew Norsic – sophomore; 48 Jerry Phillips – (redshirt) freshman; 49 Stephen Stein – freshman; 87 Matt Oczypok – freshman; Long snapper: 46 Craig Rutherford – senior; 57 Neal Dahlman – junior
* Injured; will not play in 2009

== Game summaries ==
=== Troy ===
	1	2	3	4	Total
Troy	7	7	0	0	14
Bowling Green	0	7	7	17	31

The Dave Clawson era at Bowling Green began with a home contest against the Sun Belt's Troy Trojans in the first meeting between the two schools. The game was also the first time that Bowling Green opened the season at home since 2003. The Falcons came into the game as a 7-point underdog.

Troy received the opening kickoff and marched 80 yards down the field on ten plays in just under two minutes, led by Troy quarterback Levi Brown, who had played under Clawson at Richmond. Troy running back DuJuan Harris finished off the drive, running the ball in from two yards out to put Troy up 7–0. The teams would trade punts on the next two drives before Bowling Green pushed the ball into Troy's territory. After completing a pass on fourth and six to Troy's 25-yard line, Tyler Sheehan was intercepted by Troy defensive back Bryan Willis ending the Falcons' deepest drive of the first quarter. Troy would push their lead to 14–0 after Brown hit wide receiver Jerrel Jernigan for a 13-yard touchdown. The Falcons would answer on the following drive, as Sheehan hooked up with senior wide receiver Freddie Barnes for a 31-yard touchdown pass cutting Troy's lead to 14–7. Late in the second quarter Troy drove deep into Bowling Green's territory, but their drive stalled at the Falcons' 17-yard line after the Trojans failed to convert on fourth and one. The Falcons would run the clock out and end the half trailing 14–7

The Falcons would show a totally different look in the second half effectively shutting the door on the Troy's offense, including forcing a fumble and intercepting Brown twice. The Falcons scored on their second drive of the third quarter, as Sheehan found Barnes for eight yards and their second touchdown of the game. On the first play of the fourth quarter, senior defensive back Roger Williams intercepted a Levi Brown pass at Bowling Green's 29-yard line. Bowling Green would take the lead on the following possession, as freshman kicker Jerry Phillips converted a 21-yard field goal making the score 17–14 in Bowling Green's favor. Bowling Green would score on its second consecutive possession, as junior runningback Willie Geter capped off a 4 play, 49 yard drive with a one-yard rush, increasing the Falcons' lead to 24–14. Bowling Green freshman defensive back Adrien Spencer sealed the win for Bowling Green after he picked Brown off on a fourth and four and took the ball back for a 64-yard interception return for a touchdown, increasing the score to 31–14.

During the game, Bowling Green senior wide receiver Freddie Barnes set the school record for most receptions in a game, as he collected 15 receptions for 157 yards and Clawson became the eighth consecutive coach to win their debut as the head coach at Bowling Green.

=== Missouri ===
	1	2	3	4	Total
Bowling Green	10	3	7	0	20
Missouri	0	6	7	14	27

The Falcons' second game of the season came on the road against the Big 12's Missouri Tigers who came into the game ranked #25th in the nation. The Falcons entered the game with a 3–1 series advantage, including a 20 – 13 victory the last time the two teams met at Faurot Field in 2001. The Falcons came into the game as a 20-point underdog and were not expected to cause the Tigers much of a threat.

The Falcons would start off the game well reaching the red zone on three of their first five drives. The Falcons would strike first as Tyler Sheehan hooked up with sophomore receiver Ray Hutson on a 10-yard touchdown pass late in the first quarter to complete a 10 play, 80-yard drive and give the Falcons a 7–0 lead. On the first play of Missouri's ensuing possession, sophomore quarterback Blaine Gabbert fumbled the ball after being hit by Falcons' senior linebacker Cody Basler and the ball was recovered by junior defensive lineman Carlos Tipton at Missouri's 22-yard line. The Falcons offense would waist the opportunity, going three and out, gaining three yards and having to settle for a 37-yard field goal from freshman kicker Jerry Phillips to push the Falcons lead to 10–0 at the end of the first quarter. The Falcons would recover another fumble in Missouri's territory as senior defensive back Jahmal Brown forced Missouri junior defensive back to fumble the ball on a punt return and junior linebacker Neal Dahlman recovered the ball for the Falcons at Missouri's 18-yard line. The Falcons would waist their second possession with a short field, going three and out for four yards and settling for a 32-yard field goal from Phillips to push the lead to 13–0. The Tigers would get two field goals from sophomore kicker Grant Ressel (38, 46) to cut the Falcon lead to 13–6 at halftime.

Bowling Green would keep the foot on the pedal entering the second half, taking the opening possession of the half 73 yards on 11 plays capped off with a 1-yard touchdown run from Willie Geter to push the Falcons lead to 20–6. From there, the Falcons offense would go stagnant, only gaining five first downs the rest of the game. Missouri would wear down the Falcons' defense starting with an 11 play, 87 yard drive culminating in a 27-yard touchdown pass from Gabbert to Jarred Perry to cut the Falcons' lead to 20–13. Missouri would continue to run down the Falcons scoring on their next two possessions with a 33-yard pass from Gabbert to Wes Kemp and a 1-yard run by Der Washington to give the Tigers the 27–20 lead. The Falcons would have one last chance, taking possession at their own 16-yard line. Sheehan would complete a 17-yard pass to senior receiver Chris Wright on the first play of the drive, but would only complete one of his next four passes as the Falcons turned the ball over on downs near midfield.
