= Martin Bayless =

American football player and coach (born 1962)

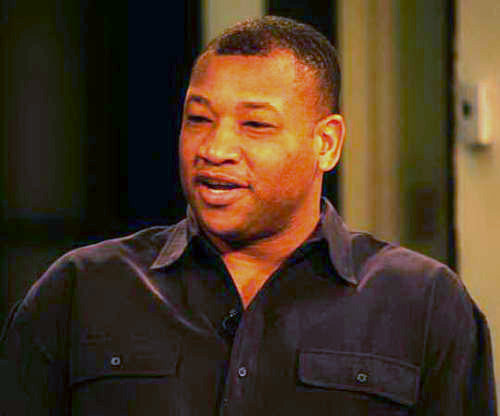

Orlando Storm
- Title: Special teams coordinator

Personal information
- Born: October 11, 1962 (age 64); Dayton, Ohio, U.S.
- Listed height: 6 ft 2 in (1.88 m)
- Listed weight: 195 lb (88 kg)

Career information
- High school: Belmont (Dayton)
- College: Bowling Green
- NFL draft: 1984: 4th round, 101st overall pick

Career history

Playing
- St. Louis Cardinals (1984); Buffalo Bills (1984-1986); San Diego Chargers (1987–1991); Kansas City Chiefs (1992–1993); Washington Redskins (1994); Kansas City Chiefs (1995–1996)

Coaching
- Buffalo Bills (2000–2001) Director of player development & special projects; North Carolina (2002) Graduate assistant; Barcelona Dragons (2002) Coaching intern - defensive backs; Amsterdam Admirals (2003) Coaching intern - defensive backs & special teams; Carolina Panthers (2003) Defensive quality control & assistant defensive backs coach; Oakland Raiders (2004–2005) Assistant special teams coordinator; Houston Texans (2006–2007) Assistant defensive backs coach & quality control secondary; Minnesota Vikings (2008) NFL coaching intern - secondary; California Redwoods (2009) Defensive backs coach; Sacramento Mountain Lions (2010–2011) Defensive coordinator & special teams coordinator; Denver Broncos (2012) Bill Walsh minority coaching internship – special teams; Arizona Cardinals (2017) Bill Walsh minority coaching internship – special teams coordinator; Your Call Football (2018) Defensive coordinator & secondary coach; Indianapolis Colts (2018) NFL minority coaching fellowship internship – secondary & special teams; Birmingham Iron (2019) Secondary coach & assistant special teams; Los Angeles Wildcats (2020) Special teams coordinator & safeties coach; Brevard (2020–2021) Special teams coordinator & assistant head coach; Jacksonville Jaguars (2021) Intern - special teams quality control; Philadelphia Stars (2022–2023) Special teams coordinator & defensive backs coach; Brevard (2022–2023) Senior defensive coordinator & head JV football coach; New Jersey Generals (2023) Special teams coordinator & safeties coach; St. Louis Battlehawks (2024–2025) Secondary coach; Brevard (2024) Defensive coordinator; Orlando Storm (2026–present) Special teams coordinator

Operations
- NFLPA (2012–2015) Regional director of player affairs, collegiate bowl director of football operations; NFLPA (2013–2015) Player development

Awards and highlights
- Third-team All-American (1983)

Career NFL statistics
- Tackles: 795
- Sacks: 11.5
- Interceptions: 12
- Stats at Pro Football Reference

Martin Ashley Bayless (born October 11, 1962) is an American football coach and former cornerback and safety. He is the special teams coordinator coach for the Orlando Storm of the United Football League (UFL). He played 13 seasons in the National Football League (NFL) and played college football at Bowling Green State University. He was drafted by the St. Louis Cardinals in the fourth round of the 1984 NFL Draft with the 101st overall pick. He is 2nd all-time for most career (FBS) interceptions with 27. After retiring from the NFL in 1998, he joined the Buffalo Bills as a Front Office Executive in 2000. He transitioned into coaching in the college ranks, and he has since held jobs with several professional football organizations.

In 2018, Bayless became the assistant special teams coordinator and secondary coach for the Birmingham Iron of the Alliance of American Football. The following year, he joined the XFL's Los Angeles Wildcats as special teams coordinator and safeties coach.

In 2022, Bayless joined the Philadelphia Stars of the United States Football League as the defensive backs coach and special teams coordinator. On January 1, 2024, it was announced the Stars would not be a part of the UFL Merger.
