= Brandon Hicks (American football) =

American football player (born 1977)

No. 72
- Position: Defensive tackle

Personal information
- Born: November 17, 1977 (age 48); Shields Township, Illinois, U.S.
- Listed height: 6 ft 0 in (1.83 m)
- Listed weight: 282 lb (128 kg)

Career information
- High school: Fairborn (Fairborn, Ohio)
- College: Bowling Green
- NFL draft: 2002: undrafted

Career history
- Indianapolis Colts (2002–2003)

Awards and highlights
- MAC Defensive Player of the Year (2001)
- Stats at Pro Football Reference

Brandon Elliott George Hicks (born November 17, 1977) is an American former professional football defensive tackle who played for the Indianapolis Colts of the National Football League (NFL). He played college football for the Bowling Green Falcons.

== Early life ==
Brandon Elliott George Hicks was born on November 17, 1977, in Shields Township, Illinois. He attended Fairborn High School in Fairborn, Ohio.

== College career ==
Hicks enrolled at Bowling Green State University to play college football for the Falcons. He redshirted the 1997 season and was a four-year letterman from 1998 to 2001. As a senior defensive tackle in 2001, he earned Sporting News Mid-American Conference (MAC) Defensive Player of the Year and consensus first-team All-MAC honors. Hicks played in the 2002 East–West Shrine Game.

== Professional career ==
After going undrafted in the 2002 NFL draft, Hicks signed with the Indianapolis Colts on April 26, 2002. He was waived on September 1 and signed to the practice squad on September 3, where he spent the entire 2002 season. He signed a reserve/future contract with the Colts on January 6, 2003. Hicks was inactive for the first two regular season games in 2003. He made his NFL debut in Week 3 against the Jacksonville Jaguars, posting one solo tackle and one assisted tackle in a reserve role on defense. He was inactive for the next three games and was waived on October 25. Hicks re-signed with the Colts on October 28 and played in all three games from Weeks 9 to 11 but did not record any statistics. He was then waived for the final time on November 18, 2003.
