= Scotty Miller =

American football player (born 1997)

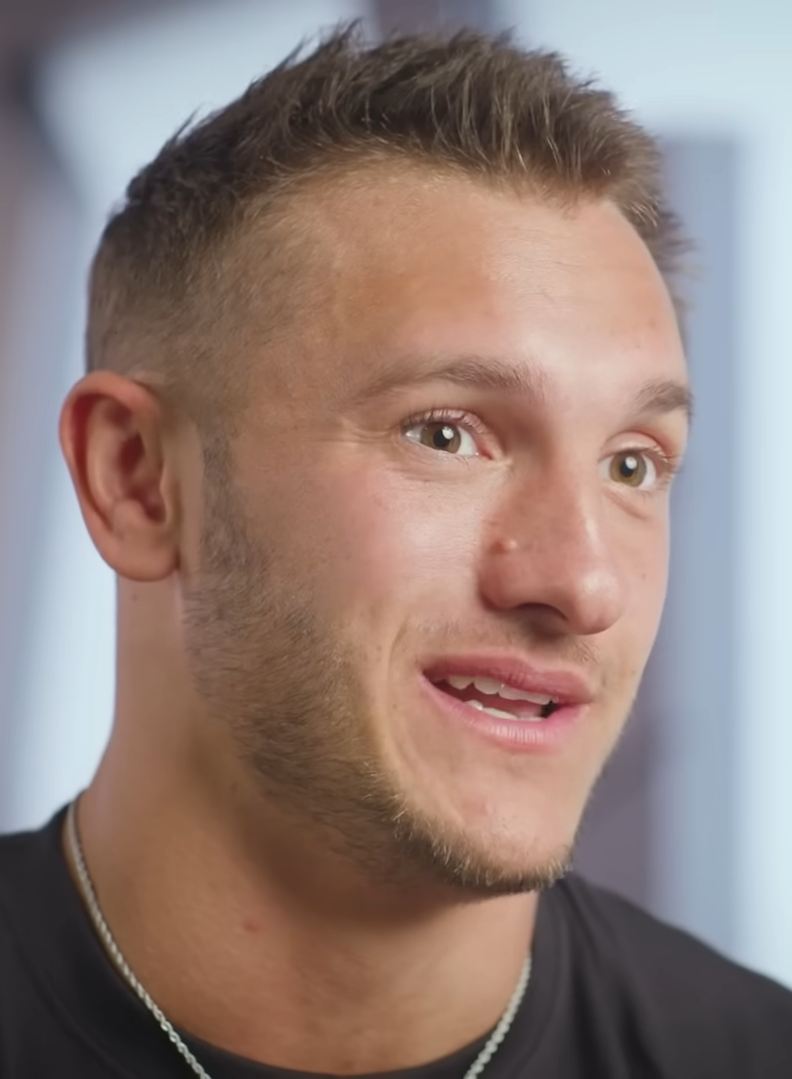
- Miller in 2023

No. 82 – Chicago Bears
- Position: Wide receiver
- Roster status: Practice squad

Personal information
- Born: July 31, 1997 (age 29); Barrington, Illinois, U.S.
- Listed height: 5 ft 9 in (1.75 m)
- Listed weight: 174 lb (79 kg)

Career information
- High school: Barrington
- College: Bowling Green (2015–2018)
- NFL draft: 2019: 6th round, 208th overall pick

Career history
- Tampa Bay Buccaneers (2019–2022); Atlanta Falcons (2023); Pittsburgh Steelers (2024–2025); Chicago Bears (2026–present)*
- * Offseason or practice squad member only

Awards and highlights
- Super Bowl champion (LV); First-team All-MAC (2016); Second-team All-MAC (2018); Third-team All-MAC (2017)

Career NFL statistics as of 2026
- Receptions: 99
- Receiving yards: 1,216
- Receiving touchdowns: 6
- Stats at Pro Football Reference

Scott Thomas Miller (born July 31, 1997) is an American professional football wide receiver for the Chicago Bears of the National Football League (NFL). He played college football for the Bowling Green Falcons and was selected by the Tampa Bay Buccaneers in the sixth round of the 2019 NFL draft. He has also played for the Atlanta Falcons and Pittsburgh Steelers.

== Early life ==
Miller was born and raised in Barrington, Illinois. He was a star football player at Barrington High School, graduating in 2015. He was regarded as a two-star recruit coming out of high school. He also had personal bests of 10.48 in the 120M, and 10.6 in the 100M in track and field.

He committed to play for Bowling Green on November 11, 2014, over offers from North Dakota State and South Dakota State.

== College career ==
Miller played four seasons for the Falcons. As a freshman, Miller led the team in kick return yards and played primarily special teams. As a sophomore, Miller would emerge as the team's top receiver, leading the Falcons with 74 catches, 968 yards and 10 touchdown catches. He was named First Team All-Mid-American Conference (MAC) and ranked 25th in the country for touchdown catches. He finished with four 100-yard receiving games, including a career best 178 yards against Miami of Ohio. He also had 161 receiving yards and three touchdown receptions against North Dakota. In 2017, Miller was named third team All-MAC and once again led the team in receptions and yards. His best game came against Middle Tennessee State University where he had a season-high 112 yards and one touchdown. In 2018, he was named Second team All-MAC and led the team in receiving yards for the third straight season. Miller also led the team in receptions and touchdown catches. In week one against Oregon, he caught 13 passes for 166 yards and two touchdowns. In week seven against Western Michigan, he would haul in eight catches for a career high 206 yards and two touchdowns. Miller was ranked seventh nationally in receiving yards per game with 104.4. Miller ended the season ranking third all time in program history with 215 career receptions and 2,867 career receiving yards. On Miller's final play as a Falcon, he caught a 63-yard touchdown pass against Buffalo. Miller graduated from Bowling Green State University in 2019.

=== College statistics ===
| Season | Team | Games | | Receiving | | | | Rushing | | | | Kick return | | | | Punt return | | | |
| Season | Team | GP | GS | Rec | Yds | Avg | TD | Att | Yds | Avg | TD | Ret | Yds | Avg | TD | Ret | Yds | Avg | TD |
|---|---|---|---|---|---|---|---|---|---|---|---|---|---|---|---|---|---|---|---|
| 2015 | Bowling Green | 10 | 0 | 7 | 29 | 4.1 | 0 | — | — | — | — | 24 | 457 | 19.0 | 0 | — | — | — | — |
| 2016 | Bowling Green | 12 | 11 | 74 | 968 | 13.1 | 10 | — | — | — | — | 19 | 336 | 17.7 | 0 | 3 | 19 | 6.3 | 0 |
| 2017 | Bowling Green | 12 | 12 | 63 | 722 | 11.5 | 4 | 2 | 22 | 11.0 | 0 | — | — | — | — | — | — | — | — |
| 2018 | Bowling Green | 11 | 11 | 71 | 1,148 | 16.2 | 9 | 4 | 16 | 4.0 | 0 | — | — | — | — | 4 | 19 | 4.8 | 0 |
| Career | | 45 | 34 | 215 | 2,867 | 13.3 | 23 | 6 | 38 | 6.3 | 0 | 43 | 793 | 18.4 | 0 | 7 | 38 | 5.4 | 0 |

== Professional career ==
Pre-draft measurables
| Height | Weight | Arm length | Hand span | Wingspan | 40-yard dash | 10-yard split | 20-yard split | 20-yard shuttle | Three-cone drill | Vertical jump | Broad jump | Bench press |
|---|---|---|---|---|---|---|---|---|---|---|---|---|
| 5 ft 9 1/8 in (1.76 m) | 174 lb (79 kg) | 29 1/4 in (0.74 m) | 8 3/4 in (0.22 m) | 5 ft 10 3/8 in (1.79 m) | 4.36 s | 1.51 s | 2.56 s | 3.99 s | 6.97 s | 34.0 in (0.86 m) | 10 ft 3 in (3.12 m) | 15 reps |
All values from Pro Day

=== Tampa Bay Buccaneers ===
==== 2019 season ====
Miller was selected by the Tampa Bay Buccaneers in the sixth round, 208th overall, of the 2019 NFL draft. The Buccaneers acquired the selection used on Miller in a trade that sent DeSean Jackson to the Philadelphia Eagles. Miller's 40-yard dash was clocked as low as 4.2s and as high as 4.39 at his Pro Day.

In Week 15, during a 38–17 win against the Detroit Lions, Miller caught three passes for 49 yards and his first career touchdown but injured his hamstring and left the game. On December 17, 2019, Miller was placed on injured reserve.

Miller finished his rookie season with 13 catches for 200 yards and one touchdown as well as two rushes for 18 yards.

==== 2020 season ====
In Week 4 against the Los Angeles Chargers, Miller recorded five catches for 83 yards and his first touchdown of the season, his first from new quarterback Tom Brady, during the 38–31 win. In Week 7 against the Las Vegas Raiders, Miller recorded six catches for 109 receiving yards and a touchdown for his first professional 100-yard game. Overall, Miller finished the 2020 season with 33 receptions for 501 receiving yards and three receiving touchdowns.

In the NFC Championship against the Green Bay Packers, Miller recorded a 39 yard touchdown reception at the end of the first half during the 31–26 win. Miller played in Super Bowl LV against the Kansas City Chiefs, which the Buccaneers won, earning Miller his first Super Bowl ring.

==== 2021 season ====
On September 29, 2021, Miller was placed on injured reserve with turf toe. He was activated on November 23.

==== 2022 season ====
Miller played in 15 games, with 23 catches for 185 yards for the 2022 season.

=== Atlanta Falcons ===
On March 28, 2023, Miller signed with the Atlanta Falcons. He played in all 17 games, recording 11 catches for 161 yards and two touchdowns.

=== Pittsburgh Steelers ===
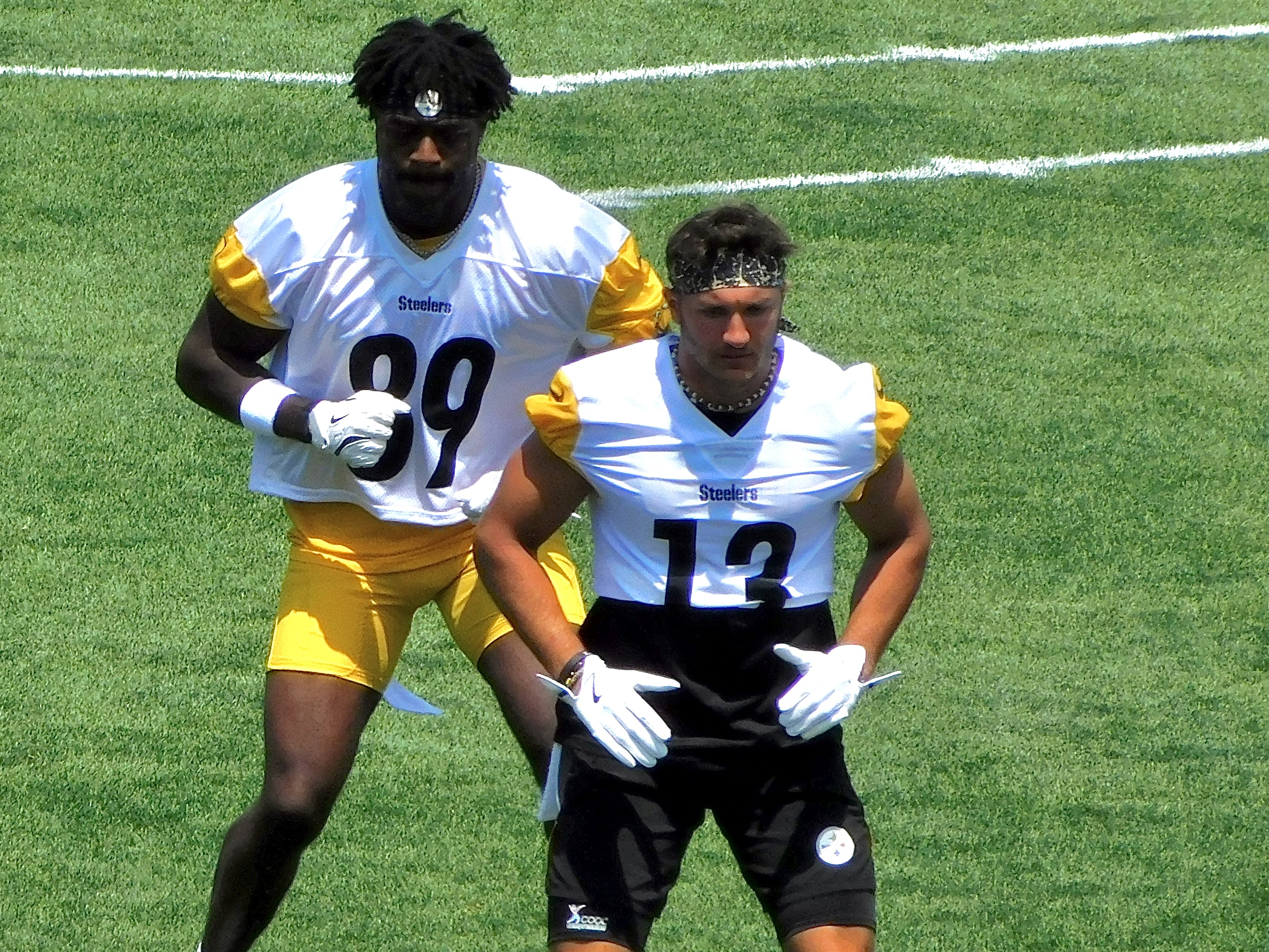
Miller and Roc Taylor during Steelers training camp in 2025

On May 10, 2024, Miller signed a one-year contract with the Pittsburgh Steelers. He was released on January 9, 2025. Miller was re-signed to the team's practice squad on January 11. In 13 games for Pittsburgh, including one start, he recorded five receptions for 69 yards.

On March 13, 2025, Miller re-signed with the Steelers. He had nine receptions for 62 yards in 13 games.

=== Chicago Bears ===
After becoming a free agent, Miller signed with the Chicago Bears on May 11, 2026. He was released by Chicago as a part of final roster cuts on August 30. Miller was re–signed to Chicago's practice squad the following day. On September 24, he was released. He was re-signed to the team's practice squad on October 6.

== NFL career statistics ==
Legend
| 1 | Won the Super Bowl |
| **Bold** | Career high |

=== Regular season ===
| Year | Team | Games | | Receiving | | | | | Rushing | | | | | Fumbles | |
| Year | Team | GP | GS | Rec | Yds | Avg | Lng | TD | Att | Yds | Avg | Lng | TD | Fum | Lost |
|---|---|---|---|---|---|---|---|---|---|---|---|---|---|---|---|
| 2019 | TB | 10 | 2 | 13 | 200 | **15.4** | 48 | 1 | 2 | 16 | 8.0 | 18 | 0 | 0 | 0 |
| 2020 | TB | 16 | **5** | **33** | **501** | 15.2 | 48 | **3** | **3** | 14 | 4.7 | 7 | 0 | 0 | 0 |
| 2021 | TB | 9 | 0 | 5 | 38 | 7.6 | 13 | 0 | 2 | **43** | **21.5** | **33** | **1** | 0 | 0 |
| 2022 | TB | 15 | 1 | 23 | 185 | 8.0 | 23 | 0 | 1 | 8 | 8.0 | 8 | 0 | 0 | 0 |
| 2023 | ATL | **17** | 0 | 11 | 161 | 14.6 | **56** | 2 | 0 | 0 | 0.0 | 0 | 0 | 0 | 0 |
| 2024 | PIT | 13 | 1 | 5 | 69 | 13.8 | 21 | 0 | 0 | 0 | 0.0 | 0 | 0 | 0 | 0 |
| 2025 | PIT | 13 | 0 | 9 | 62 | 6.9 | 15 | 0 | 0 | 0 | 0.0 | 0 | 0 | 0 | 0 |
| Career | | 93 | 9 | 99 | 1,216 | 12.3 | 56 | 6 | 8 | 81 | 10.1 | 33 | 1 | 0 | 0 |

=== Postseason ===
| Year | Team | Games | | Receiving | | | | | Rushing | | | | | Fumbles | |
| Year | Team | GP | GS | Rec | Yds | Avg | Lng | TD | Att | Yds | Avg | Lng | TD | Fum | Lost |
|---|---|---|---|---|---|---|---|---|---|---|---|---|---|---|---|
| 2020 | TB | **4** | **2** | 4 | **80** | **20.0** | **39** | **1** | 2 | 5 | 2.5 | 8 | 0 | 0 | 0 |
| 2021 | TB | 2 | 0 | **5** | 46 | 9.2 | 19 | 0 | 1 | 9 | 9.0 | 9 | 0 | 0 | 0 |
| 2022 | TB | 1 | 0 | 0 | 0 | 0.0 | 0 | 0 | 0 | 0 | 0.0 | 0 | 0 | 0 | 0 |
| 2025 | PIT | 1 | 0 | 0 | 0 | 0.0 | 0 | 0 | 0 | 0 | 0.0 | 0 | 0 | 0 | 0 |
| Career | | 8 | 2 | 9 | 126 | 14.0 | 39 | 1 | 3 | 14 | 4.7 | 8 | 0 | 0 | 0 |

== Personal life ==
Miller is a Christian. He is married.

Miller has three sisters.
