= Paul Miles (American football) =

American football player (born 1952)

No. 25
- Position: Running back

Personal information
- Born: March 25, 1952 (age 74); Paulding, Ohio, U.S.
- Listed height: 6 ft 0 in (1.83 m)
- Listed weight: 188 lb (85 kg)

Career information
- High school: Paulding
- College: Bowling Green (1970–1973)
- NFL draft: 1974: 8th round, 198th overall pick

Career history
- Memphis Southmen (1974)

Awards and highlights
- MAC Offensive Player of the Year (1973); Bowling Green Falcons No. 29 retired

Career WFL statistics
- Rushing yards: 325
- Rushing average: 3.5
- Rushing touchdowns: 3
- Receptions: 15
- Receiving yards: 123

Paul J. Miles (born March 25, 1952) is an American former professional football running back who played for the Memphis Southmen of the World Football League (WFL). He played college football for the Bowling Green Falcons.

== Early life ==
Miles was born in 1952 and attended Paulding High School in Paulding, Ohio.

== College career ==
Miles played college football at Bowling Green State University for the Bowling Green Falcons football team, from 1970 to 1973. He was the third running back in NCAA history to have three seasons of 1,000-plus rushing yards: 1,185 yards as a sophomore; 1,024 yards as a junior; and 1,031 yards as a senior. He was rated by the Associated Press (AP) at the end of the 1973 season as the greatest running back in the history of the Mid-America Conference (MAC). Also at the end of the 1973 season, Bowing Green retired his jersey No. 29, the first and only player in school honor to be so honored. While attending Bowling Green, he also played the guitar and sang in a folk-rock style in a one-man nightclub act. He was inducted into the Bowling Green Athletic Hall of Fame in 1990.

== Professional career ==
Miles was selected in the eighth round with the 198th overall pick of the 1974 NFL draft by the Baltimore Colts, but he never played in the National Football League (NFL). Instead, he played professionally in the World Football League (WFL) for the Memphis Southmen during the 1974 season.
