= 2009 Humanitarian Bowl =

2009 Roady's Humanitarian Bowl
Bowling Green Falcons	Idaho Vandals
(7–5)	(7–5)
MAC	WAC
42	43
Head coach: Dave Clawson	Head coach: Robb Akey
	1	2	3	4	Total
Bowling Green	14	0	7	21	42
Idaho	7	7	14	15	43
- Date: December 30, 2009
- Season: 2009
- Stadium: Bronco Stadium
- Location: Boise, Idaho
- MVP: Freddie Barnes - WR - (BGSU); DeMaundray Woolridge - RB - (Idaho)
- Referee: Larry Farina (Pac-10)
- Attendance: 26,726
- Payout: US$750,000 per team

United States TV coverage
- Network: ESPN
- Announcers: Eric Collins; Brock Huard; Heather Cox
- Nielsen ratings: 2.1

The 2009 Humanitarian Bowl was the thirteenth edition of the college football bowl game, and was played at Bronco Stadium in Boise, Idaho, on the campus of Boise State University. The game started at 2:30 pm MST on Wednesday, December 30, 2009, and was telecasted on ESPN. Idaho defeated Bowling Green 43–42.

As of this game, the Humanitarian Bowl was the longest continuously running cold weather bowl. The 2009 game was Idaho's first bowl game in more than a decade, when they defeated Southern Mississippi in the 1998 Humanitarian Bowl. Bowling Green, in its debut at the Humanitarian Bowl, filled a spot usually reserved for the Mountain West Conference; however, the MWC champion TCU was selected to play in the Fiesta Bowl and the conference did not have enough bowl-eligible teams to fill out its usual bowl commitments. Bowling Green played in the GMAC Bowl the previous season, where it lost 63–7 to Tulsa. The game also marked the first time the two schools had met in competition.

Both teams entered the game with 7-5 records in the regular season: Idaho began the 2009 season at 6–1, but lost four of its last five. Meanwhile, Bowling Green was 1–4 early in the season, but won six of its last seven games.

== Game summary ==
Idaho wore their home black jerseys with gold pants. Bowling Green wore their away white jerseys with white pants.

A bowl game that promised much offense certainly delivered, with just one turnover and a blocked field goal, both in Idaho's favor. The teams traded touchdowns all day and Idaho won its first bowl game in 11 years in one of the most exciting bowl games of the season. Tied in the final minute and with 3rd down and 11 at their own 49, the Falcons took a 42-35 lead with 32 seconds left on a 51-yard pass from Tyler Sheehan to Freddie Barnes, who easily slipped behind the Idaho secondary for his 17th catch of the game and number 155 in his record-setting season.

After the ensuing kickoff, the Vandals had 24 seconds to work with and completed an incredible 46-yard pass for a first down at the BGSU 16-yard line. After an incomplete pass stopped the clock with 8 seconds remaining, wide receiver Max Komar cradled a sliding 16-yard touchdown catch with 4 seconds left to put the Vandals within a point. Head coach Robb Akey decided to go for the win and forego overtime; QB Nathan Enderle found Preston Davis alone in the back of the end zone for the two-point conversion to seal the comeback victory.

De'Maundray Woolridge carried Idaho with 126 yards on 22 rushes and two third-quarter touchdowns. Enderle finished the game completing 15 of his 28 passes for 240 yards and four touchdowns, after starting the game 1 of 6.

Sheehan was 33 of 47 for 387 yards and four touchdowns for Bowling Green, but it was the 14th consecutive bowl loss for the Mid-American Conference. For their efforts on offense, Woolridge and Barnes were named MVP's for the game.

=== Scoring summary ===
Scoring Play	Score
1st Quarter
BG — Freddie Barnes 35-yard pass from Tyler Sheehan (Matthew Norsic kick), 11:44	BG 7–0
ID — Peter Bjorvik 3-yard pass from Nathan Enderle (Trey Farquhar Kick),7:49	TIE 7–7
BG — Willie Geter 59-yard run (Matthew Norsic kick), 0:16	BG 14-7
2nd Quarter
ID — Eric Greenwood 7-yard pass from Nathan Enderle (Trey Farquhar Kick), 0:19	TIE 14–14
3rd Quarter
ID — DeMaundray Woolridge 8-yard run (Trey Farquhar Kick), 9:25	ID 21–14
ID — DeMaundray Woolridge 13-yard run (Trey Farquhar Kick), 5:30	ID 28–14
BG — Jimmy Scheidler 14-yard pass from Tyler Sheehan (Matthew Norsic kick), 3:40	ID 28–21
4th Quarter
BG — Freddie Barnes 5-yard pass from Tyler Sheehan (Matthew Norsic kick), 12:15	TIE 28–28
ID — Preston Davis 30-yard pass from Nathan Enderle (Trey Farquhar kick), 8:32	ID 35–28
BG — Willie Geter 2-yard run (Matthew Norsic kick), 3:51	TIE 35–35
BG — Freddie Barnes 51-yard pass from Tyler Sheehan (Matthew Norsic kick), 0:32	BG 42–35
ID — Max Komar 16-yard pass from Nathan Enderle (Preston Davis pass from Nathan Enderle two-point conversion), 0:04	ID 43–42
