= Freddie Barnes =

American football player (born 1986)

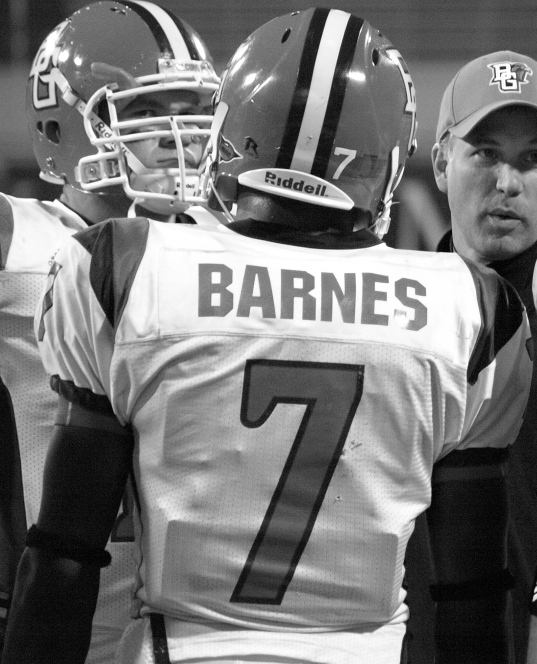
- Barnes in 2009

No. 23
- Position: Wide receiver

Personal information
- Born: December 6, 1986 (age 39); Chicago, Illinois, U.S.
- Listed height: 5 ft 11 in (1.80 m)
- Listed weight: 210 lb (95 kg)

Career information
- High school: Flossmoor (IL) Homewood-Flossmoor
- College: Bowling Green
- NFL draft: 2010: undrafted

Career history
- Chicago Bears (2010)*; Chicago Rush (2011)*; Saskatchewan Roughriders (2011); Chicago Rush (2013)*
- * Offseason or practice squad member only

Awards and highlights
- First-team All-American (2009); First-team All-MAC (2009)
- Stats at ArenaFan.com

Freddie Lee Barnes (born December 6, 1986) is an American former professional football player who was a wide receiver in the National Football League (NFL). He played college football for the Bowling Green Falcons. He was signed by the Chicago Bears of the National Football League (NFL) as an undrafted free agent in 2010.

During 2009, including the Humanitarian Bowl, Barnes accumulated an NCAA Football Bowl Subdivision record 155 receptions for 1,770 yards, 19 receiving touchdowns, as well as two rushing touchdowns. The 155-reception total not only surpassed the Division I record, but also an NCAA All-division record. He also broke Randy Moss' single-season Mid-American Conference yardage record. In addition, he established several Bowling Green Falcons football records during the season. During his senior season, in established numerous receiving records, was named a 2009 College Football All-American and was one of three 2009 Fred Biletnikoff Award finalists. Previously, he had been a multisport athlete at Homewood-Flossmoor High School.

== Early life ==
Barnes attended Homewood-Flossmoor High School in Flossmoor, Illinois, where he earned three letters for the Vikings playing quarterback. He served as team captain and was named team MVP, as well as All-Area and All-Conference in 2004. Barnes also lettered in basketball, where he was a teammate of Julian Wright.

Considered only a two-star recruit by Rivals.com, Barnes was not ranked among the nation's elite quarterback prospects in 2005. He chose Bowling Green over Eastern Michigan and Indiana.

== College career ==
Barnes' freshman season he caught 20 passes for 203 yards, two touchdowns, and rushed for 405 yards and 9 touchdowns. As a sophomore, he caught 82 passes for 962 yards and 9 touchdowns, and was selected for All-Mid-American Conference third-team honors. He caught 41 passes for 364 yards, but no touchdowns as a Junior in 2008.

During his senior year in 2009 he accumulated 16 touchdown catches and a league leading 138 receptions. He is third in reception yards with 1,551, and among his season's highlights was a school-record 22-catch effort (one short of an NCAA single-game record) for 278 yards, including three touchdowns, in a 36–35 victory over Kent State. Barnes was four receptions away from matching the NCAA single-season record as Bowling Green awaited its bowl game against the Idaho Vandals. In his final game at Bowling Green against the Idaho Vandals in the Humanitarian Bowl, Barnes had 17 receptions for 219 yards and 3 touchdowns including a go-ahead score with 32 seconds left in the game. It turned out to be enough time for the Vandals to answer on their final drive, and they converted a two-point conversion for the win. Barnes established both new Football Bowl Subdivision and All Division single-season reception records by surpassing Manny Hazard and Nick Smart, respectively. On the season, Barnes' 1770 yards surpassed Randy Moss MAC single-season total. Barnes also surpassed several school records such as single-season touchdown receptions and career receptions. Barnes' yardage total and yards per game were second to Danario Alexander among FBS receivers for 2009.

Barnes was chosen as one of three finalists for the Fred Biletnikoff Award. Notre Dame's Golden Tate won the award. Barnes was also discussed as a dark horse candidate for the 2009 Heisman Trophy, despite being on a BCS non-AQ conference team and not being a quarterback, based on thirty more catches than any other receiver and being close to the top in touchdowns. Barnes was named to the All-Mid-American Conference first-team on December 2, 2009, and on December 12, he was named a 2009 All-American by the Football Writers Association of America.

=== Statistics ===
	Led NCAA Division I FBS
**Bold**	Career best

=== Statistics ===
Season	Team	Games			Passing								Rushing				Receiving			
Season	Team	GP	GS	Record (Note: Accounts for only GS as a QB. Started at QB 9/2/06 & 9/23/06.)	Cmp	Att	Pct	Yds	Y/A	TD	Int	Rtg	Att	Yds	Avg	TD	Rec	Yds	Avg	TD
2005	Bowling Green	Redshirted (redshirt)																		
2006	Bowling Green	12	4	0–2	**27**	**50**	54.0	**210**	4.2	1	**2**	87.9	**96**	**405**	**4.2**	**9**	20	203	10.2	2
2007	Bowling Green	**13**	**13**	—	0	2	0.0	0	0.0	0	1	-100.0	3	11	3.7	0	82	962	**11.7**	9
2008	Bowling Green	9	8	—	3	4	**75.0**	31	**7.8**	**2**	0	**305.1**	22	86	3.9	0	40	355	8.9	0
2009	Bowling Green	**13**	**13**	—	3	7	42.9	7	1.0	0	0	51.3	25	78	3.1	2	**155**	**1,770**	11.4	**19**
Career		47	38	0–2	33	63	52.4	248	3.9	3	3	91.6	146	580	4.0	11	297	3,290	11.1	30

=== College awards and honors ===
- 2009 All-American (FWAA)
- 2009 Biletnikoff Award finalist

National Collegiate Athletic Association record

- Single-season receptions (155, 2009–2016) (both Division I and All Divisions)

Mid-American Conference record

- Single-season receiving yards (1,770, 2009–)

Bowling Green record

- Career receptions (298, 2009–)
- Single-season touchdown receptions (19, 2009–)
- Single-game receptions (22, 2009–)
- Single-game receiving yards (278, 2009–)

== Professional career ==
=== 2010 NFL draft ===
Wes Bunting of National Football Post opined that Barnes may lack the speed to be an elite NFL receiver, but stated that "he certainly has the talent to fill out an NFL receiving corps." At the 2010 East-West Shrine Game practice, Barnes "impressed scouts with the ability to consistently separate from defensive backs and find the openings in the coverage," according to Sports Illustrated's Tony Pauline.

Pre-draft measurables
Height	Weight	40-yard dash	20-yard shuttle	Three-cone drill	Vertical jump	Broad jump	Bench press
6 ft 0 in (1.83 m)	215 lb (98 kg)	4.67 s	4.55 s	7.16 s	30 1/2 in (0.77 m)	8 ft 11 in (2.72 m)	12 reps
All numbers are from Bowling Green's Pro Day

=== Chicago Bears ===
Barnes signed as an undrafted free agent with the Chicago Bears on April 24, 2010. He was waived on September 3, and was re-signed to the team's practice squad on November 2.

=== Chicago Rush ===
Barnes was also a member of the Arena Football Team Chicago Rush, having signed a contract on October 8, 2010. He was on a league exemption during his stint with the Chicago Bears after being signed to the practice squad on November 2, 2010. He then returned to the Rush on December 15, 2010, after being released by the Bears.

=== Saskatchewan Roughriders ===
Barnes was signed to the practice roster of the Saskatchewan Roughriders on August 9, 2011. He appeared in one regular season game in 2011, but was released on January 31, 2012.

== Personal life ==
His hometown is Chicago Heights, Illinois. His mother, Clarissa Charles, who had him at age 14, dropped out of high school, but later earned her high school equivalency degree, then her college degree.

== See also ==
- List of NCAA major college football yearly receiving leaders
