= Kevin O'Brien (American football) =

American gridiron football player (born 1970)

No. 48, 91
- Position: Linebacker

Personal information
- Born: July 1, 1970 (age 56)

Career information
- College: Bowling Green
- NFL draft: 1993: undrafted

Career history
- Buffalo Bills (1993) *; Sacramento Gold Miners (1994); Barcelona Dragons (1995); New England Patriots (1995) *; Barcelona Dragons (1996)

Awards and highlights
- Second-team All-MAC (1991); First-team All-MAC (1992); First-team All-World League (1995)

Kevin O'Brien (born July 1, 1970) is a former professional American football linebacker who played in the Canadian Football League and the World League of American Football. During his career he played for the Sacramento Gold Miners of the CFL, and the Barcelona Dragons of the WLAF.

== College career ==
O'Brien played college football at Bowling Green State University, where he was a two-time All-Mid-American Conference selection.

== Professional career ==
=== Buffalo Bills ===
O'Brien was signed by the Buffalo Bills as an undrafted free agent on May 7, 1993. He was waived on August 24.

=== Barcelona Dragons ===
The Barcelona Dragons selected O'Brien in the 26th round of the 1995 World League Draft. He finished the season with 6.5 sacks and earned first-team All-World League honors.

=== New England Patriots ===
Following the World League season, O'Brien was signed by the New England Patriots on July 11, 1995. The Patriots waived him on August 14.
