= Charles Sharon =

American football player (born 1983)

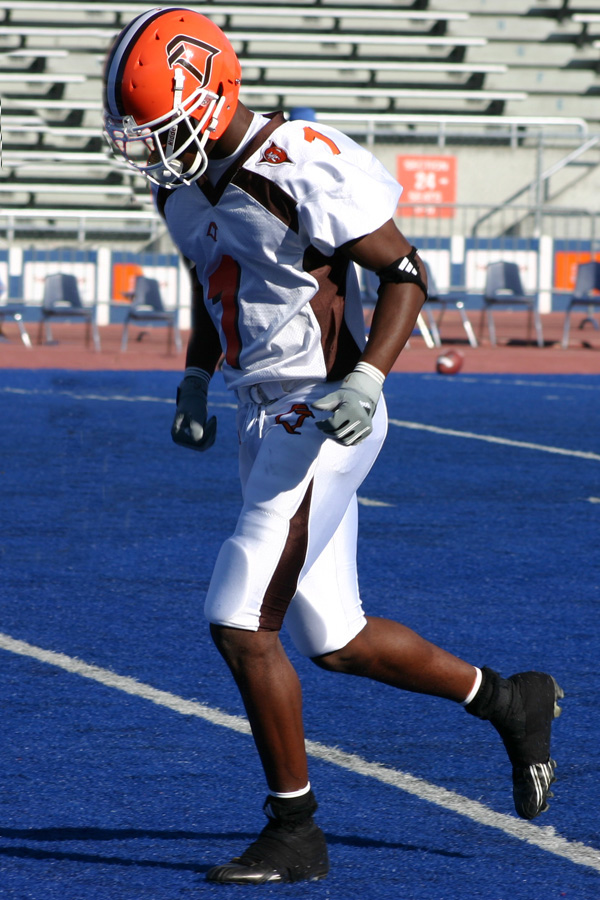
- Charles Sharon with the Bowling Green Falcons

No. 17
- Position: Wide receiver

Personal information
- Born: April 4, 1983 (age 43); Palatka, Florida, U.S.
- Listed height: 6 ft 0 in (1.83 m)
- Listed weight: 184 lb (83 kg)

Career information
- College: Bowling Green
- NFL draft: 2006: undrafted

Career history
- Jacksonville Jaguars (2006–2007)

Awards and highlights
- Second-team All-MAC (2005)

Charles Dunbar Sharon (born April 4, 1983) is an American former football wide receiver who played for the Jacksonville Jaguars of the National Football League (NFL). He was signed by the Jaguars as an undrafted free agent in 2006. He played college football for the Bowling Green Falcons.

== Early life ==
Sharon attended Palatka High School in Palatka, Florida and was a letterman in football, basketball, and track and field. In football, as a senior, he made 25 receptions for 600 yards (24.0 yards per reception avg.), and was a second-team All-State selection. In track & field, he set the school record in the triple jump with a jump of 47 feet and 7 inches. Charles Sharon graduated from Palatka High School in 2001.

== College ==
Sharon caught a pass in a school-record 48 consecutive games. He left the program as the all-time leader in receptions, receiving yards and touchdowns.

=== Statistics ===
Year	Team	Games		Receiving				Rushing				Punt returns				Kick returns			
Year	Team	GP	GS	Rec	Yds	Avg	TD	Att	Yds	Avg	TD	Ret	Yds	Avg	TD	Ret	Yds	Avg	TD
2001	Bowling Green	Redshirt (redshirt)																	
2002	Bowling Green	12	10	33	465	14.1	3	0	0	0.0	0	2	21	10.5	0	0	0	0.0	0
2003	Bowling Green	13	13	59	887	15.0	10	1	7	7.0	0	31	274	8.8	0	0	0	0.0	0
2004	Bowling Green	12	12	66	1,070	16.2	15	0	0	0.0	0	24	282	11.8	1	1	18	18.0	0
2005	Bowling Green	11	11	74	1,028	13.9	6	3	26	8.7	0	25	271	10.8	0	6	170	28.3	0
Career		48	46	232	3,450	14.9	34	4	33	8.3	0	82	848	10.3	1	7	188	26.9	0
