= P. J. Pope =

American football player (born 1984)

No. 28, 31
- Position: Running back

Personal information
- Born: February 26, 1984 (age 42); Cincinnati, Ohio, U.S.
- Listed height: 5 ft 9 in (1.75 m)
- Listed weight: 205 lb (93 kg)

Career information
- High school: Wyoming (Wyoming, Ohio)
- College: Bowling Green
- NFL draft: 2006: undrafted

Career history
- Chicago Bears (2006)*; Green Bay Packers (2006); Chicago Bears (2007–2008)*; Denver Broncos (2008)
- * Offseason or practice squad member only

Awards and highlights
- First-team All-MAC (2003); Second-team All-MAC (2004)

Career NFL statistics
- Rushing attempts: 17
- Rushing yards: 130
- Receptions: 3
- Receiving yards: 24
- Receiving touchdowns: 1
- Stats at Pro Football Reference

William Leroy "P. J." Pope Jr. (born February 26, 1984) is an American former professional football player who was a running back in the National Football League (NFL). He played college football at Bowling Green and was signed by the Chicago Bears as an undrafted free agent in 2006. Pope was also a member of the Green Bay Packers and Denver Broncos.

== Early life ==
Pope attended Wyoming High School in Wyoming, Ohio, where he excelled in baseball and football. During his senior year, Pope ran for 2,230 rushing yards and 36 touchdowns, enough to help him win the "Southern Ohio Player of the Year" Award.

== College career ==
During Pope's career at Bowling Green State University, he managed to become the school's third all-time leading rusher. He became the only player in the school's history to record 3,000 rushing and 1,000 receiving yards.

== Professional career ==
=== Chicago Bears (first stint) ===
The Chicago Bears signed Pope as an undrafted free agent before the 2006 NFL preseason to compensate for the absence of starting running backs Thomas Jones and Cedric Benson. The Bears later cut Pope from the team on September 9, but was shortly re-signed onto the practice squad.

=== Green Bay Packers ===
The Green Bay Packers signed Pope from the Bears' practice squad on October 31, 2006. On August 24, 2007, he was cut along with 11 other players from Green Bay.

=== Chicago Bears (second stint) ===
Pope was re-signed to the Bears' practice squad in September 2007. He remained there the entire season and spent the 2008 preseason with the team before being waived on August 29.

=== Denver Broncos ===
On August 31, 2008, Pope was signed to the practice squad of the Denver Broncos He was released on October 20, only to be re-signed to following day. Pope was promoted to the Broncos active roster on November 4, a day after running backs Andre Hall and Michael Pittman were placed on season-ending injured reserve. Pope became the starter when Peyton Hillis also went on injured reserve.

Pope was waived by the Broncos on February 11, 2009.

== Coaching career ==
Pope was the 8th grade football coach at Wyoming Middle School. As of 2013 he is a varsity assistant at Shroder High School in Cincinnati.
