= 2005 Temple Owls football team =

American college football season

2005 Temple Owls football
- Conference: Independent
- Record: 0–11
- Head coach: Bobby Wallace (8th season)
- Offensive coordinator: Willie J. Slater (2nd season)
- Offensive scheme: Multiple
- Defensive coordinator: Raymond Monica (8th season)
- Base defense: 4–3
- MVP: Christian Dunbar
- Captains: Christian Dunbar; John Gross; Ray Lamb; Mike Mendenhall
- Home stadium: Lincoln Financial Field

2005 NCAA Division I-A independents football records
	Conf.			Overall
Team	W		L	W		L
No. 9 Notre Dame %		–		9	–	3
Navy		–		8	–	4
Army		–		4	–	7
Temple		–		0	–	11
% – BCS at-large representative; Rankings from AP Poll

The 2005 Temple Owls football team represented Temple University in the college 2005 NCAA Division I-A football season. Temple competed as an independent, and finished with a winless record of 0–11. The team was coached by Bobby Wallace and played their homes game in Lincoln Financial Field. After a 0–6 start Bobby Wallace did not seek renewal of his contract.

This was the first season since 1990 that the Owls did not compete as members of the Big East Conference. In 2001, the Big East announced that Temple would be expelled from the conference following the 2004 season, citing low attendance records.

== Schedule ==
Date	Time	Opponent	Site	TV	Result	Attendance
September 1	10:00 p.m.	at No. 18 Arizona State	Sun Devil Stadium; Tempe, Arizona	FSNAZ	L 16–63	50,049
September 10	12:00 p.m.	at Wisconsin	Camp Randall Stadium; Madison, Wisconsin	ESPNU	L 0–65	81,806
September 17	1:00 p.m.	Toledo	Lincoln Financial Field; Philadelphia	CN8	L 17–42	9,055
September 24	1:00 p.m.	Western Michigan	Lincoln Financial Field; Philadelphia	CN8	L 16–19	8,922
October 1	4:00 p.m.	at Bowling Green	Doyt Perry Stadium; Bowling Green, Ohio	CN8	L 7–70	19,462
October 8	1:00 p.m.	Maryland	Lincoln Financial Field; Philadelphia		L 7–38	11,311
October 15	1:00 p.m.	No. 7 Miami (FL)^{†}	Lincoln Financial Field; Philadelphia	FSN	L 3–34	23,129
October 22	12:30 p.m.	at Clemson	Memorial Stadium; Clemson, South Carolina	CN8	L 7–37	74,841
October 29	1:00 p.m.	Miami (OH)	Lincoln Financial Field; Philadelphia		L 14–41	11,257
November 5	3:30 p.m.	at Virginia	Scott Stadium; Charlottesville, Virginia		L 3–51	57,060
November 19	1:30 p.m.	at Navy	Navy–Marine Corps Memorial Stadium; Annapolis, Maryland	CSTV	L 17–38	30,261
^{†}Homecoming; Rankings from AP Poll released prior to the game; All times are in Eastern time

== Roster ==
2005 Temple Owls football team roster
Players
Coaches
Offense

Pos.	#	Name	Class
WR	2	Brian Allbrooks	Sr
TE	88	Kevin Armstrong	Fr
RB	27	Michael Billops	Sr
WR	83	William Bradley	Sr
RB	7	Tim Brown	Sr
RB	39	Josh Bundy	So
QB	6	Colin Clancy	Fr
QB	13	Joe Desanzo	Fr
G	60	Neil Dickson	Jr
RB	34	Umar Ferguson	Sr
WR	82	Bruce Francis	Fr
WR	80	Bruce Gordon	Jr
OL	78	John Gross	Sr
WR	19	Domerio Hamilton	Jr
WR	10	Jamel Harris	Jr
QB	17	Shane Kelly	Fr
TE	88	Anthony Martinez	Sr
QB	16	Mike McGann	Sr
RB	32	Mike Neal	So
WR	14	Nick Santa Cruz	Jr
OT	70	Elliot Seifert	Jr
WR	22	Travis Shelton	So
OL	53	Jacob Simon	Sr
FB	42	Vince Yasenchak	Jr

Defense

Pos.	#	Name	Class
DE	93	Leyon Azubuike	Fr
DE	47	J.C. Braker	Sr
DT	99	Antwon Burton	Sr
CB	28	Evan Cooper Jr.	Fr
LB	46	Christian Dunbar	Sr
DT	58	Adam Fichter	Sr
S	15	Bobby Fulmore	Sr
LB	5	Ryan Gore	Jr
CB	33	Willie Hardemon	So
DB	24	Dominique Harris	Fr
LB	43	Keith Holt	Fr
DB	4	Justin Johnson	Sr
DT	92	Terrance Knighton	Fr
CB	20	Ray Lamb	Sr
DB	26	Michael Loveland	Jr
LB	44	Walter Mebane	Jr
DL	45	Mike Mendenhall	Sr
CB	24	Chris Page	Jr
LB	52	Byron Payne	Jr
DB	9	Garrett Schultz	Jr
CB	25	Richard Sheppard	Fr
DB	38	Darren Sinclair	Sr
DT	61	Alston Smith	Fr
LB	96	Manuel Tapia	Sr
DE	96	Devin Tyler	Fr
DB	36	Delonne Wilbourn	Sr
DE	89	Rodney Wormley	Sr

Special teams

Pos.	#	Name	Class
P	12	Jake Hendy	Sr
K	13	Ryan Lux	Sr
P	37	Mike McLaughlin	Sr

Head coach

- Bobby Wallace

Coordinators/assistant coaches

Legend

- (C) Team captain
- (S) Suspended
- (I) Ineligible
- Injured
- Redshirt

== Game summaries ==
=== At No. 20 Arizona State ===
	1	2	3	4	Total
Owls	0	2	7	7	16
No. 20 Sun Devils	14	14	14	21	63

Statistics	TEM	ASU
First downs	18	27
Total yards	265	559
Rushing yards	62	300
Passing yards	203	259
Passing: comp–att–int	18–37–2	19–31–2
Turnovers	3	3

Team	Category	Player	Statistics
Temple	Passing	Mike McGann	18/37, 203 yards, TD, 2 INT
Temple	Rushing	Umar Ferguson	16 rushes, 42 yards
Temple	Receiving	Bruce Gordon	6 receptions, 98 yards
Arizona State	Passing	Sam Keller	14/24, 208 yards, 4 TD, 2 INT
Arizona State	Rushing	Keegan Herring	12 rushes, 134 yards, TD
Arizona State	Receiving	Derek Hagan	3 receptions, 53 yards, 2 TD

=== At Wisconsin ===
	1	2	3	4	Total
Owls	0	0	0	0	0
Badgers	17	34	14	0	65

Statistics	TEM	WIS
First downs	5	26
Total yards	45	492
Rushing yards	-11	263
Passing yards	56	229
Passing: comp–att–int	6–26–1	15–25–0
Turnovers	1	1

Team	Category	Player	Statistics
Temple	Passing	Mike McGann	4/20, 38 yards, INT
Temple	Rushing	Umar Ferguson	12 rushes, 32 yards
Temple	Receiving	Jamel Harris	3 receptions, 27 yards
Wisconsin	Passing	John Stocco	12/19, 180 yards, 3 TD
Wisconsin	Rushing	Jamil Walker	13 rushes, 79 yards, TD
Wisconsin	Receiving	Owen Daniels	6 receptions, 88 yards, 3 TD

=== Toledo ===
	1	2	3	4	Total
Rockets	21	7	0	14	42
Owls	0	7	3	7	17

Statistics	TOL	TEM
First downs	22	21
Total yards	393	381
Rushing yards	196	136
Passing yards	197	245
Passing: comp–att–int	23–32–1	18–38–2
Turnovers	1	3

Team	Category	Player	Statistics
Toledo	Passing	Bruce Gradkowski	20/29, 182 yards, 4 TD, INT
Toledo	Rushing	Trinity Dawson	12 rushes, 63 yards
Toledo	Receiving	Chris Hopkins	5 receptions, 56 yards, TD
Temple	Passing	Mike McGann	12/29, 160 yards, 2 INT
Temple	Rushing	Michael Billops	18 rushes, 121 yards, TD
Temple	Receiving	Bruce Gordon	8 receptions, 103 yards

=== Western Michigan ===
	1	2	3	4	Total
Broncos	2	14	0	3	19
Owls	13	3	0	0	16

Statistics	WMU	TEM
First downs	23	15
Total yards	378	285
Rushing yards	151	127
Passing yards	227	158
Passing: comp–att–int	22–36–2	10–23–1
Turnovers	5	3

Team	Category	Player	Statistics
Western Michigan	Passing	Ryan Cubit	18/29, 191 yards, 2 TD, INT
Western Michigan	Rushing	Trovon Riley	27 rushes, 91 yards
Western Michigan	Receiving	Tony Scheffler	7 receptions, 118 yards
Temple	Passing	Mike McGann	10/23, 158 yards, INT
Temple	Rushing	Umar Ferguson	33 rushes, 110 yards, TD
Temple	Receiving	Brian Allbrooks	4 receptions, 84 yards

=== At Bowling Green ===
	1	2	3	4	Total
Owls	0	7	0	0	7
Falcons	14	28	21	7	70

Statistics	TEM	BGSU
First downs	15	30
Total yards	263	461
Rushing yards	161	135
Passing yards	102	326
Passing: comp–att–int	12–24–3	26–31–1
Turnovers	5	1

Team	Category	Player	Statistics
Temple	Passing	Mike McGann	8/16, 66 yards, 3 INT
Temple	Rushing	Umar Ferguson	28 rushes, 132 yards, TD
Temple	Receiving	Jamel Harris	4 receptions, 47 yards
Bowling Green	Passing	Omar Jacobs	26/30, 326 yards, 4 TD
Bowling Green	Rushing	Anthony Turner	9 rushes, 32 yards, TD
Bowling Green	Receiving	Steve Sanders	5 receptions, 108 yards, 2 TD

=== Maryland ===
	1	2	3	4	Total
Terrapins	3	14	14	7	38
Owls	7	0	0	0	7

Statistics	UMD	TEM
First downs	26	11
Total yards	472	226
Rushing yards	220	110
Passing yards	252	116
Passing: comp–att–int	22–35–1	8–16–1
Turnovers	2	4

Team	Category	Player	Statistics
Maryland	Passing	Sam Hollenbach	19/29, 228 yards, INT
Maryland	Rushing	Mario Merrills	12 rushes, 66 yards, 3 TD
Maryland	Receiving	Vernon Davis	5 receptions, 79 yards
Temple	Passing	Mike McGann	8/14, 116 yards
Temple	Rushing	Umar Ferguson	25 rushes, 96 yards, TD
Temple	Receiving	Brian Allbrooks	4 receptions, 63 yards

=== No. 7 Miami (FL) ===
	1	2	3	4	Total
No. 7 Hurricanes	27	7	0	0	34
Owls	0	3	0	0	3

Statistics	MIA	TEM
First downs	16	12
Total yards	351	180
Rushing yards	34	84
Passing yards	317	96
Passing: comp–att–int	16–21–0	10–23–0
Turnovers	2	0

Team	Category	Player	Statistics
Miami (FL)	Passing	Kyle Wright	9/10, 196 yards, 4 TD
Miami (FL)	Rushing	Tyrone Moss	10 rushes, 27 yards
Miami (FL)	Receiving	Sinorice Moss	3 receptions, 122 yards, TD
Temple	Passing	Joe Desanzo	10/20, 96 yards
Temple	Rushing	Umar Ferguson	23 rushes, 77 yards
Temple	Receiving	Domerio Hamilton	2 receptions, 29 yards

=== At Clemson ===
	1	2	3	4	Total
Owls	0	0	0	7	7
Tigers	10	7	10	10	37

Statistics	TEM	CLEM
First downs	20	23
Total yards	331	514
Rushing yards	12	155
Passing yards	319	359
Passing: comp–att–int	26–44–1	22–33–1
Turnovers	3	1

Team	Category	Player	Statistics
Temple	Passing	Mike McGann	23/38, 298 yards, TD, INT
Temple	Rushing	Umar Ferguson	17 rushes, 48 yards
Temple	Receiving	Bruce Gordon	8 receptions, 120 yards
Clemson	Passing	Charlie Whitehurst	19/27, 307 yards, 2 TD, INT
Clemson	Rushing	Reggie Merriweather	17 rushes, 108 yards, TD
Clemson	Receiving	Aaron Kelly	7 receptions, 155 yards, TD

=== Miami (OH) ===
	1	2	3	4	Total
RedHawks	10	14	17	0	41
Owls	7	7	0	0	14

Statistics	MOH	TEM
First downs	24	11
Total yards	506	195
Rushing yards	127	75
Passing yards	379	120
Passing: comp–att–int	29–41–0	10–24–2
Turnovers	2	3

Team	Category	Player	Statistics
Miami (OH)	Passing	Josh Betts	28/40, 379 yards, 3 TD
Miami (OH)	Rushing	Brandon Murphy	18 rushes, 61 yards, 2 TD
Miami (OH)	Receiving	Ryne Robinson	10 receptions, 148 yards, TD
Temple	Passing	Mike McGann	6/12, 94 yards, 2 INT
Temple	Rushing	Umar Ferguson	15 rushes, 48 yards, 2 TD
Temple	Receiving	Umar Ferguson	3 receptions, 72 yards

=== At Virginia ===
	1	2	3	4	Total
Owls	0	0	0	3	3
Cavaliers	17	10	21	3	51

Statistics	TEM	UVA
First downs	11	23
Total yards	170	449
Rushing yards	10	262
Passing yards	160	187
Passing: comp–att–int	16–37–1	17–29–2
Turnovers	3	2

Team	Category	Player	Statistics
Temple	Passing	Mike McGann	9/20, 91 yards, INT
Temple	Rushing	Georg Coleman	18 rushes, 21 yards
Temple	Receiving	Bruce Francis	7 receptions, 68 yards
Virginia	Passing	Marques Hagans	10/18, 132 yards, INT
Virginia	Rushing	Jason Snelling	17 rushes, 126 yards, 2 TD
Virginia	Receiving	Maurice Covington	4 receptions, 45 yards

=== At Navy ===
	1	2	3	4	Total
Owls	0	17	0	0	17
Midshipmen	0	14	3	21	38

Statistics	TEM	NAVY
First downs	26	27
Total yards	381	495
Rushing yards	136	375
Passing yards	245	120
Passing: comp–att–int	24–39–0	4–11–0
Turnovers	1	1

Team	Category	Player	Statistics
Temple	Passing	Mike McGann	24/38, 245 yards, TD
Temple	Rushing	Umar Ferguson	22 rushes, 116 yards
Temple	Receiving	Bruce Gordon	10 receptions, 125 yards, TD
Navy	Passing	Lamar Owens	4/11, 120 yards
Navy	Rushing	Adam Ballard	29 rushes, 167 yards, TD
Navy	Receiving	Marco Nelson	1 reception, 62 yards
