= 2005 Toledo Rockets football team =

American college football season

2005 Toledo Rockets football

MAC West co-champion GMAC Bowl champion

GMAC Bowl, W 45–13 vs. UTEP
- Conference: Mid-American Conference
- West Division
- Record: 9–3 (6–2 MAC)
- Head coach: Tom Amstutz (5th season)
- Offensive coordinator: John Shannon (1st season)
- Offensive scheme: Spread
- Defensive coordinator: Tim Rose (1st season)
- Base defense: 3–4
- Home stadium: Glass Bowl

2005 Mid-American Conference football standings
	Conf.			Overall
Team	W		L	W		L
East Division
Akron xy$	5	–	3	7	–	6
Miami (OH) x	5	–	3	7	–	4
Bowling Green x	5	–	3	6	–	5
Ohio	3	–	5	4	–	7
Buffalo	1	–	7	1	–	10
Kent State	0	–	8	1	–	10
West Division
Northern Illinois xy	6	–	2	7	–	5
Toledo x	6	–	2	9	–	3
Western Michigan	5	–	3	7	–	4
Central Michigan	5	–	3	6	–	5
Ball State	4	–	4	4	–	7
Eastern Michigan	3	–	5	4	–	7
Championship: Akron 31, NIU 30
$ – Conference champion; x – Division champion/co-champions

The 2005 Toledo Rockets football team represented the University of Toledo during the 2005 NCAA Division I-A football season. They competed as a member of the Mid-American Conference (MAC) in the West Division. The Rockets were led by head coach Tom Amstutz and senior quarterback Bruce Gradkowski.

== Schedule ==
Date	Time	Opponent	Site	TV	Result	Attendance	Source
September 1	7:00 pm	Western Illinois*	Glass Bowl; Toledo, OH		W 62–14	20,092	
September 10	7:00 pm	Western Michigan	Glass Bowl; Toledo, OH		W 56–23	18,912	
September 17	1:00 pm	at Temple*	Lincoln Financial Field; Philadelphia, PA	BCSN	W 42–17	9,055	
September 27	9:00 pm	at Fresno State*	Bulldog Stadium; Fresno, CA	ESPN2	L 14–44	34,637	
October 8	7:00 pm	Eastern Michigan^{†}	Glass Bowl; Toledo, OH		W 30–3	25,266	
October 15	3:00 pm	at Ball State	Ball State Stadium; Muncie, IN		W 34–14	16,533	
October 22	7:00 pm	Buffalo	Glass Bowl; Toledo, OH		W 38–15	23,904	
October 29	1:00 pm	at Central Michigan	Kelly/Shorts Stadium; ount Pleasant, MI	ESPN Plus	L 17–21	12,801	
November 4	8:00 pm	at Ohio	Peden Stadium; Athens, OH	ESPN2	W 30–21	21,034	
November 16	7:30 pm	Northern Illinois	Glass Bowl; Toledo, OH	ESPN2	L 17–35	20,912	
November 22	7:00 pm	at Bowling Green	Doyt Perry Stadium; Bowling Green, OH (rivalry)	ESPN2	W 44–41 ^{2OT}	17,438	
December 21	8:00 pm	vs. UTEP*	Ladd–Peebles Stadium; Mobile, AL (GMAC Bowl)	ESPN	W 45–13	35,422	
*Non-conference game; ^{†}Homecoming; All times are in Eastern time

== Game summaries ==
=== At Bowling Green ===
Toledo Rockets (7–3) at Bowling Green Falcons (6–4)

Quarter	1	2	3	4	OT	Total
Toledo	0	7	17	7	13	44
Bowling Green	7	0	10	14	10	41

at Doyt Perry Stadium, Bowling Green, Ohio

- Date: November 22, 2005
- Game time: 7:00 p.m. CDT
- Game attendance: 17,438
- TV announcers (ESPN2): Dave Barnett, Craig James, Rob Stone
- Box Score

Game information

First quarter

- BGSU – Omar Jacobs 1-yard run (Joe Timchenko kick), 7:33. Bowling Green 7–0. Drive: 15 plays, 89 yards, 7:27.

Second quarter

- TOL – Steve Odom 29-yard pass from Bruce Gradkowski (Jason Robbins kick), 1:11. Tie 7–7. Drive: 4 plays, 66 yards, 0:57.

Third quarter

- TOL – Jason Robbins 44-yard field goal, 11:41. Toledo 10–7. Drive: 8 plays, 50 yards, 3:19.
- BGSU – BJ Lane 1-yard run (Joe Timchenko kick), 8:45. Bowling Green 14–10. Drive: 6 plays, 56 yards, 2:53.
- TOL – Trinity Dawson 23-yard run (Jason Robbins kick), 4:49. Toledo 17–14. Drive: 8 plays, 60 yards, 3:48.
- BGSU – Joe Timchenko 27-yard field goal, 2:39. Tie 17–17. Drive: 7 plays, 60 yards, 2:03.
- TOL – Josh Powell 17-yard pass from Bruce Gradkowski (Jason Robbins kick), 1:29. Toledo 24–17. Drive: 3 plays, 64 yards, 1:03.

Fourth quarter

- BGSU – Steve Sanders 21-yard pass from Omar Jacobs (Joe Timchenko kick), 12:40. Tie 24–24. Drive: 5 plays, 71 yards, 1:38.
- BSGU – Charles Sharon 11-yard pass from Omar Jacobs (Joe Timchenko kick), 8:01. Bowling Green 31–24. Drive: 8 plays, 62 yards, 2:38.
- TOL – Chris Hopkins 3-yard pass from Bruce Gradkowski (Jason Robbins kick), 1:43. Tie 31–31. Drive: 14 plays, 75 yards, 6:13.

Overtime

- TOL – Trinity Dawson 2-yard run (Jason Robbins kick). Toledo 38–31.
- BGSU – Steve Sanders 25-yard pass from Omar Jacobs (Joe Timchenko kick). Tie 38–38.
- BGSU – Joe Timchenko 37-yard field goal. Bowling Green 41–38.
- TOL – Chris Hopkins 22-yard pass from Bruce Gradkowski (no kick). Toledo 44–41.

Top passers

- TOL – Bruce Gradkowski – 23/36, 298 yards, 4 TD
- BGSU – Omar Jacobs – 25/43, 315 yards, 3 TD

Top rushers

- TOL – Trinity Dawson – 28 rushes, 170 yards, 2 TD
- BGSU – P.J. Pope – 23 rushes, 131 yards

Top receivers

- TOL – Steve Odom – 10 receptions, 146 yards, TD
- BGSU – Charles Sharon – 10 receptions, 106 yards, TD

External videos
- 2005 at Bowling Green – Highlights

== Personnel ==
2005 Toledo Rockets football team roster
Players
Coaches
Offense

Pos.	#	Name	Class
TE		John Allen	Fr
RB		Quinton Broussard	Sr
QB		Clint Cochran	Fr
RB		Richard Davis	Fr
RB		Trinity Dawson	Sr
QB	7	Bruce Gradkowski	Sr
OL		John Greco	So
WR		Andrew Hawkins	So
TE		Chris Hopkins	Jr
WR		Pete Lepley	Sr
WR		Nick Moore	Fr
WR		D.J. Nichols	Jr
WR		Steve Odom	Jr
RB		Jalen Parmele	So
TE		Josh Powell	Jr
WR		Andre Redd	Fr
WR		David Washington	So

Defense

Pos.	#	Name	Class
DL		Aaron Albritton	Jr
LB		Brandon Alexander	So
LB		Mike Alston	Jr
DL		J.P. Bekasiak	Jr
DB		Keiron Brown	Fr
LB		Michael Chamberlain	Jr
DL		Patrick Clark	So
DL		Bernard Faithful	So
LB	59	David Fatula	Fr
LB		Shaun Fitzgibbons	So
DB		Jason Flowers	Sr
LB		Keith Forestal	Fr
DB	27	Jeff Green	Fr
DB		Greg Hay	So
LB		Eric Heller	Fr
DB		Tyrell Herbert	So
DB		Keon Jackson	Sr
LB		Anthony Jordan	Sr
DL		Nick Lawrence	So
DB		Antonio Malone	Sr
DB		Bo Martin	Jr
LB		Marques McFarlin	So
DB		Nigel Morris	So
LB		Steven Morrison	So
DB		Hannibal Pearson	Sr
DL		Tyree Pollard	So
LB		Matt Shumaker	Fr
DL		Seth Thitoff	Jr
LB		David Thomas	Sr
DL		Sean Williamson	So

Special teams

Pos.	#	Name	Class
P		Brett Kern	So
K		Michael Kripinsky	So
K		Jason Robbins	Sr

Head coach

- Tom Amstutz

Coordinators/assistant coaches

Legend

- (C) Team captain
- (S) Suspended
- (I) Ineligible
- Injured
- Redshirt

Roster

== After the season ==
=== NFL draft ===
The following Rocket was selected in the 2006 NFL draft following the season.

Round	Pick	Player	Position	NFL club
6	194	Bruce Gradkowski	Quarterback	Tampa Bay Buccaneers
