= 2005 Bowling Green Falcons football team =

American college football season

2005 Bowling Green Falcons football

MAC East Division co-champion
- Conference: Mid-American Conference
- East
- Record: 6–5 (5–3 MAC)
- Head coach: Gregg Brandon (3rd season)
- Offensive coordinator: Greg Studrawa (3rd season)
- Defensive coordinator: John Lovett (1st season)
- Home stadium: Doyt Perry Stadium

2005 Mid-American Conference football standings
	Conf.			Overall
Team	W		L	W		L
East Division
Akron xy$	5	–	3	7	–	6
Miami (OH) x	5	–	3	7	–	4
Bowling Green x	5	–	3	6	–	5
Ohio	3	–	5	4	–	7
Buffalo	1	–	7	1	–	10
Kent State	0	–	8	1	–	10
West Division
Northern Illinois xy	6	–	2	7	–	5
Toledo x	6	–	2	9	–	3
Western Michigan	5	–	3	7	–	4
Central Michigan	5	–	3	6	–	5
Ball State	4	–	4	4	–	7
Eastern Michigan	3	–	5	4	–	7
Championship: Akron 31, NIU 30
$ – Conference champion; x – Division champion/co-champions

The 2005 Bowling Green Falcons football team represented Bowling Green State University in the 2005 NCAA Division I-A football season. The team was coached by Gregg Brandon and played their home games in Doyt Perry Stadium in Bowling Green, Ohio. It was the 87th season of play for the Falcons.

== Schedule ==
Date	Time	Opponent	Site	TV	Result	Attendance
September 3	12:00 pm	at Wisconsin*	Camp Randall Stadium; Madison, MI	ESPN	L 42–56	82,138
September 10	8:00 pm	at Ball State	Ball State Stadium; Muncie, IN		W 40–31	17,460
September 21	8:00 pm	at Boise State*	Bronco Stadium; Boise, ID	ESPN2	L 20–48	30,561
October 1	4:00 pm	Temple^{†}	Doyt Perry Stadium; Bowling Green, OH		W 70–7	19,462
October 8	6:00 pm	Ohio	Doyt Perry Stadium; Bowling Green, OH		W 38–14	14,177
October 15	1:30 pm	at Buffalo	University at Buffalo Stadium; Amherst, NY		W 27–7	6,436
October 22	4:00 pm	Western Michigan	Doyt Perry Stadium; Bowling Green, OH	BCSN	L 14–45	13,959
October 29	4:00 pm	Akron	Doyt Perry Stadium; Bowling Green, OH		L 14–24	9,608
November 5	2:00 pm	at Kent State	Dix Stadium; Kent, OH (Anniversary Award)	ESPN Plus	W 24–14	6,357
November 15	7:00 pm	at Miami (OH)	Yager Stadium; Oxford, OH	ESPN2	W 42–14	5,749
November 22	7:00 pm	Toledo	Doyt Perry Stadium; Bowling Green, OH (rivalry)	ESPN2	L 41–44 ^{2OT}	17,438
*Non-conference game; ^{†}Homecoming; All times are in Eastern time

== Roster ==
2005 Bowling Green Falcons football team roster
Players
Coaches
Offense

Pos.	#	Name	Class
QB	4	Omar Jacobs	Jr
OC	78	Kory Lichtensteiger	So
RB	33	P. J. Pope	Sr
WR	12	Steve Sanders	Sr
WR	1	Charles Sharon	Sr

Defense

Pos.	#	Name	Class
DL	99	Diyral Briggs	Fr

Special teams

Pos.	#	Name	Class

Head coach

- Gregg Brandon

Coordinators/assistant coaches

Legend

- (C) Team captain
- (S) Suspended
- (I) Ineligible
- Injured
- Redshirt

== Season summary ==
=== Toledo ===
Toledo Rockets (7–3) at Bowling Green Falcons (6–4)

Quarter	1	2	3	4	OT	Total
Toledo	0	7	17	7	13	44
Bowling Green	7	0	10	14	10	41

at Doyt Perry Stadium, Bowling Green, Ohio

- Date: November 22, 2005
- Game time: 7:00 p.m. CDT
- Game attendance: 17,438
- TV announcers (ESPN2): Dave Barnett, Craig James, Rob Stone
- Box Score

Game information

First quarter

- BGSU – Omar Jacobs 1-yard run (Joe Timchenko kick), 7:33. Bowling Green 7–0. Drive: 15 plays, 89 yards, 7:27.

Second quarter

- TOL – Steve Odom 29-yard pass from Bruce Gradkowski (Jason Robbins kick), 1:11. Tie 7–7. Drive: 4 plays, 66 yards, 0:57.

Third quarter

- TOL – Jason Robbins 44-yard field goal, 11:41. Toledo 10–7. Drive: 8 plays, 50 yards, 3:19.
- BGSU – BJ Lane 1-yard run (Joe Timchenko kick), 8:45. Bowling Green 14–10. Drive: 6 plays, 56 yards, 2:53.
- TOL – Trinity Dawson 23-yard run (Jason Robbins kick), 4:49. Toledo 17–14. Drive: 8 plays, 60 yards, 3:48.
- BGSU – Joe Timchenko 27-yard field goal, 2:39. Tie 17–17. Drive: 7 plays, 60 yards, 2:03.
- TOL – Josh Powell 17-yard pass from Bruce Gradkowski (Jason Robbins kick), 1:29. Toledo 24–17. Drive: 3 plays, 64 yards, 1:03.

Fourth quarter

- BGSU – Steve Sanders 21-yard pass from Omar Jacobs (Joe Timchenko kick), 12:40. Tie 24–24. Drive: 5 plays, 71 yards, 1:38.
- BSGU – Charles Sharon 11-yard pass from Omar Jacobs (Joe Timchenko kick), 8:01. Bowling Green 31–24. Drive: 8 plays, 62 yards, 2:38.
- TOL – Chris Hopkins 3-yard pass from Bruce Gradkowski (Jason Robbins kick), 1:43. Tie 31–31. Drive: 14 plays, 75 yards, 6:13.

Overtime

- TOL – Trinity Dawson 2-yard run (Jason Robbins kick). Toledo 38–31.
- BGSU – Steve Sanders 25-yard pass from Omar Jacobs (Joe Timchenko kick). Tie 38–38.
- BGSU – Joe Timchenko 37-yard field goal. Bowling Green 41–38.
- TOL – Chris Hopkins 22-yard pass from Bruce Gradkowski (no kick). Toledo 44–41.

Top passers

- TOL – Bruce Gradkowski – 23/36, 298 yards, 4 TD
- BGSU – Omar Jacobs – 25/43, 315 yards, 3 TD

Top rushers

- TOL – Trinity Dawson – 28 rushes, 170 yards, 2 TD
- BGSU – P.J. Pope – 23 rushes, 131 yards

Top receivers

- TOL – Steve Odom – 10 receptions, 146 yards, TD
- BGSU – Charles Sharon – 10 receptions, 106 yards, TD
