= 2005 Kent State Golden Flashes football team =

American college football season

2005 Kent State Golden Flashes football
- Conference: Mid-American Conference
- East
- Record: 1–10 (0–8 MAC)
- Head coach: Doug Martin (2nd season)
- Offensive scheme: Air raid
- Defensive coordinator: Pete Rekstis (2nd season)
- Base defense: 4–3
- Home stadium: Dix Stadium

2005 Mid-American Conference football standings
	Conf.			Overall
Team	W		L	W		L
East Division
Akron xy$	5	–	3	7	–	6
Miami (OH) x	5	–	3	7	–	4
Bowling Green x	5	–	3	6	–	5
Ohio	3	–	5	4	–	7
Buffalo	1	–	7	1	–	10
Kent State	0	–	8	1	–	10
West Division
Northern Illinois xy	6	–	2	7	–	5
Toledo x	6	–	2	9	–	3
Western Michigan	5	–	3	7	–	4
Central Michigan	5	–	3	6	–	5
Ball State	4	–	4	4	–	7
Eastern Michigan	3	–	5	4	–	7
Championship: Akron 31, NIU 30
$ – Conference champion; x – Division champion/co-champions

The 2005 Kent State Golden Flashes football team represented the Kent State University during the 2005 NCAA Division I-A football season. Kent State competed as a member of the Mid-American Conference (MAC), and played their home games at Dix Stadium. The Golden Flashes were led by second-year head coach Doug Martin.

== Schedule ==
Date	Time	Opponent	Site	TV	Result	Attendance
September 3	12:00 pm	at Michigan State*	Spartan Stadium; East Lansing, MI	ESPN+	L 14–49	73,949
September 10	4:00 pm	SE Missouri State (I-AA)*	Dix Stadium; Kent, OH		W 33–12	6,228
September 17	4:00 pm	Miami (OH)	Dix Stadium; Kent, OH		L 10–27	14,002
September 24	2:00 pm	at Ohio	Peden Stadium; Athens, OH		L 32–35	16,721
October 1	2:00 pm	at Eastern Michigan	Rynearson Stadium; Ypsilanti, MI		L 20–27	6,294
October 15	1:30 pm	at Navy*	Navy–Marine Corps Memorial Stadium; Annapolis, MD		L 31–34	30,316
October 22	1:00 pm	Northern Illinois	Dix Stadium; Kent, OH		L 3–34	3,554
October 29	2:00 pm	at Western Michigan	Waldo Stadium; Kalamazoo, MI		L 14–44	14,168
November 5	2:00 pm	Bowling Green	Dix Stadium; Kent, OH (Battle for the Anniversary Award)	ESPN+	L 14–24	6,357
November 12	1:00 pm	Buffalo	Dix Stadium; Kent, OH		L 6–10	3,151
November 24	10:00 am	at Akron	Rubber Bowl; Akron, OH (Battle for the Wagon Wheel)		L 3–35	8,942
*Non-conference game; All times are in Eastern time
