= 2005 Central Michigan Chippewas football team =

American college football season

2005 Central Michigan Chippewas football
- Conference: Mid-American Conference
- West Division
- Record: 6–5 (5–3 MAC)
- Head coach: Brian Kelly (2nd season)
- Offensive coordinator: Jeff Quinn (2nd season)
- Home stadium: Kelly/Shorts Stadium

2005 Mid-American Conference football standings
	Conf.			Overall
Team	W		L	W		L
East Division
Akron xy$	5	–	3	7	–	6
Miami (OH) x	5	–	3	7	–	4
Bowling Green x	5	–	3	6	–	5
Ohio	3	–	5	4	–	7
Buffalo	1	–	7	1	–	10
Kent State	0	–	8	1	–	10
West Division
Northern Illinois xy	6	–	2	7	–	5
Toledo x	6	–	2	9	–	3
Western Michigan	5	–	3	7	–	4
Central Michigan	5	–	3	6	–	5
Ball State	4	–	4	4	–	7
Eastern Michigan	3	–	5	4	–	7
Championship: Akron 31, NIU 30
$ – Conference champion; x – Division champion/co-champions

The 2005 Central Michigan Chippewas football team represented Central Michigan University during the 2005 NCAA Division I-A football season. Central Michigan competed as a member of the West Division of the Mid-American Conference (MAC). The Chippewas were led by second-year head coach Brian Kelly.

The Chippewas compiled a 6–5 record (5–3 in conference games).

== Schedule ==
Date	Time	Opponent	Site	TV	Result	Attendance
September 2	7:30 pm	Indiana*	Kelly/Shorts Stadium; Mount Pleasant, MI	ESPNU	L 13–20	22,212
September 10	2:00 pm	at Miami (OH)	Yager Stadium; Oxford, OH		W 38–37	16,956
September 17	3:30 pm	at Penn State*	Beaver Stadium; State College, PA	ESPN Plus	L 3–40	100,276
September 24	1:00 pm	Eastern Michigan	Kelly/Shorts Stadium; Mount Pleasant, MI (rivalry)		L 20–23 ^{OT}	15,013
October 1	6:00 pm	at Akron	Rubber Bowl; Akron, OH		W 31–17	10,093
October 8	1:00 pm	at Army*	Michie Stadium; West Point, NY	ESPNC	W 14–10	31,018
October 15	1:00 pm	Ohio^{†}	Kelly/Shorts Stadium; Mount Pleasant, MI		W 37–10	16,017
October 29	7:00 pm	Toledo	Kelly/Shorts Stadium; Mount Pleasant, MI	ESPN Plus	W 42–20	19,822
November 5	1:00 pm	Northern Illinois	Kelly/Shorts Stadium; Mount Pleasant, MI		L 28–31	13,812
November 12	2:00 pm	at Western Michigan	Waldo Stadium; Kalamazoo, MI (rivalry)	ESPN Plus	L 24–31	23,484
November 19	12:00 pm	at Ball State	Scheumann Stadium; Muncie, IN	CL	W 31–24 ^{OT}	7,386
*Non-conference game; ^{†}Homecoming; All times are in Eastern time
