= 2005 Army Black Knights football team =

American college football season

2005 Army Black Knights football
- Conference: Independent
- Record: 4–7
- Head coach: Bobby Ross (2nd season)
- Offensive coordinator: Kevin Ross (2nd season)
- Offensive scheme: Pro-style
- Defensive coordinator: John Mumford (2nd season)
- Base defense: 4–3
- Captains: Pete Bier; Carlton Jones; Ray Stith; Dhyan Tarver
- Home stadium: Michie Stadium

2005 NCAA Division I-A independents football records
	Conf.			Overall
Team	W		L	W		L
No. 9 Notre Dame %		–		9	–	3
Navy		–		8	–	4
Army		–		4	–	7
Temple		–		0	–	11
% – BCS at-large representative; Rankings from AP Poll

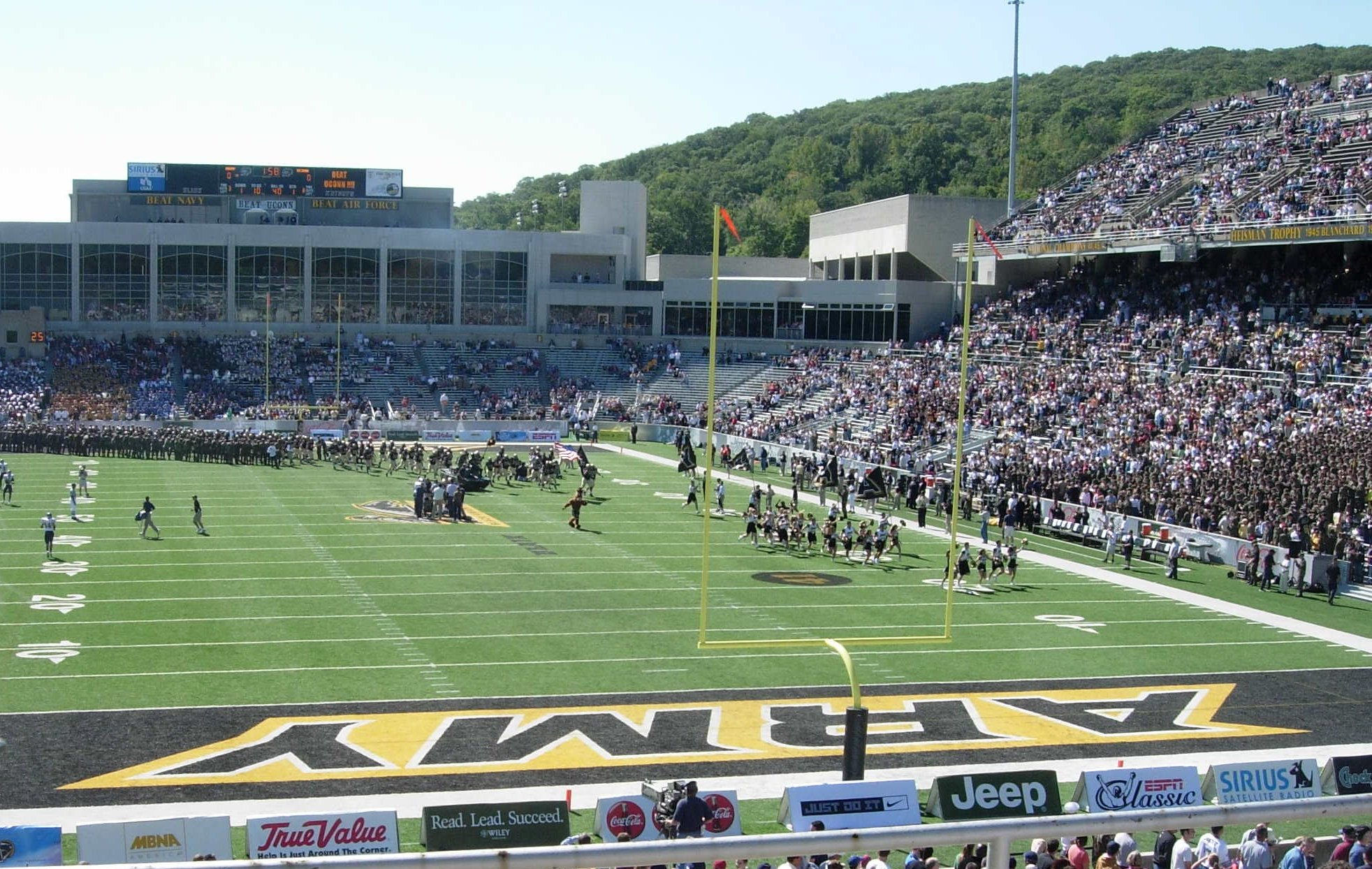
The Army Black Knights enter Michie Stadium

The 2005 Army Black Knights football team represented the United States Military Academy as an independent during the 2005 NCAA Division I-A football season.

== Schedule ==
Date	Time	Opponent	Site	TV	Result	Attendance
September 10	12:30 p.m.	at No. 19 Boston College	Alumni Stadium; Chestnut Hill, MA	ESPN Classic	L 44–7	40,166
September 17	3:00 p.m.	Baylor	Michie Stadium; West Point, NY	ESPN Classic	L 20–10	31,357
September 23	8:00 p.m.	No. 22 Iowa State	Michie Stadium; West Point, NY	ESPN2	L 28–21	25,007
October 1	12:00 p.m.	Connecticut	Michie Stadium; West Point, NY	ESPNU	L 47–13	38,482
October 8	1:00 p.m.	Central Michigan	Michie Stadium; West Point, NY	ESPN Classic	L 14–10	31,018
October 15	7:00 p.m.	at No. 25 TCU	Amon G. Carter Stadium; Fort Worth, TX		L 38–17	34,478
October 22	6:00 p.m.	at Akron	Rubber Bowl; Akron, OH		W 20–0	12,203
November 5	3:30 p.m.	at Air Force	Falcon Stadium; Colorado Springs, CO (Commander-in-Chief's Trophy)	ESPN Classic	W 27–24	44,782
November 12	12:00 p.m.	No. 5 (I-AA) UMass	Michie Stadium; West Point, NY	ESPNU	W 34–27	34,055
November 19	12:00 p.m.	Arkansas State	Michie Stadium; West Point, NY	ESPNU	W 38–10	25,692
December 3	2:30 p.m.	vs. Navy	Lincoln Financial Field; Philadelphia, PA (Army–Navy Game)	CBS	L 23-42	69,322
Rankings from AP Poll released prior to the game; All times are in Eastern time
