= 2005 Ohio Bobcats football team =

American college football season

2005 Ohio Bobcats football
- Conference: Mid-American Conference
- East
- Record: 4–7 (3–5 MAC)
- Head coach: Frank Solich (1st season)
- Offensive coordinator: Tim Albin (1st season)
- Defensive coordinator: Jim Burrow (1st season)
- Home stadium: Peden Stadium

2005 Mid-American Conference football standings
	Conf.			Overall
Team	W		L	W		L
East Division
Akron xy$	5	–	3	7	–	6
Miami (OH) x	5	–	3	7	–	4
Bowling Green x	5	–	3	6	–	5
Ohio	3	–	5	4	–	7
Buffalo	1	–	7	1	–	10
Kent State	0	–	8	1	–	10
West Division
Northern Illinois xy	6	–	2	7	–	5
Toledo x	6	–	2	9	–	3
Western Michigan	5	–	3	7	–	4
Central Michigan	5	–	3	6	–	5
Ball State	4	–	4	4	–	7
Eastern Michigan	3	–	5	4	–	7
Championship: Akron 31, NIU 30
$ – Conference champion; x – Division champion/co-champions

The 2005 Ohio Bobcats football team represented Ohio University during the 2005 NCAA Division I-A football season. Ohio competed as a member of the Mid-American Conference (MAC) in the East Division. The Bobcats were led by Frank Solich in his first year as head coach. They played their home games in Peden Stadium in Athens, Ohio.

== Schedule ==
Date	Time	Opponent	Site	TV	Result	Attendance
September 3	12:00 pm	at Northwestern*	Ryan Field; Evanston, IL	ESPNU	L 14–38	20,115
September 9	8:00 pm	Pittsburgh*	Peden Stadium; Athens, OH	ESPN2	W 16–10 ^{OT}	24,545
September 17	3:30 pm	at No. 4 Virginia Tech*	Lane Stadium; Blacksburg, VA	ESPNU	L 0–45	65,115
September 24	2:00 pm	Kent State	Peden Stadium; Athens, OH		W 35–32	16,721
October 8	6:00 pm	at Bowling Green	Doyt Perry Stadium; Bowling Green, OH		L 14–38	14,177
October 15	1:00 pm	at Central Michigan	Kelly/Shorts Stadium; Mount Pleasant, MI		L 10–37	16,017
October 22	2:00 pm	Ball State	Peden Stadium; Athens, OH	ESPN+	W 38–21	17,959
October 29	1:30 pm	at Buffalo	University at Buffalo Stadium; Amherst, NY		W 34–20	5,814
November 4	8:00 pm	Toledo	Peden Stadium; Athens, OH	ESPN2	L 21–30	21,034
November 15	7:30 pm	at Akron	Rubber Bowl; Akron, OH	ESPNU	L 3–27	7,614
November 21	7:30 pm	Miami (OH)	Peden Stadium; Athens, OH (Battle of the Bricks)	ESPNU	L 7–38	9,908
*Non-conference game; Rankings from AP Poll released prior to the game; All times are in Eastern time
