= 2005 Akron Zips football team =

American college football season

2005 Akron Zips football
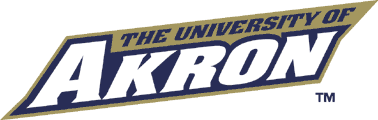

MAC champion MAC East Division co-champion

MAC Championship Game, W 31–30 vs. NIU

Motor City Bowl, L 31–38 vs. Memphis
- Conference: Mid-American Conference
- East Division
- Record: 7–6 (5–3 MAC)
- Head coach: J. D. Brookhart (2nd season)
- Offensive coordinator: Jim Pry (2nd season)
- Defensive coordinator: Jim Fleming (2nd season)
- Home stadium: Rubber Bowl

2005 Mid-American Conference football standings
	Conf.			Overall
Team	W		L	W		L
East Division
Akron xy$	5	–	3	7	–	6
Miami (OH) x	5	–	3	7	–	4
Bowling Green x	5	–	3	6	–	5
Ohio	3	–	5	4	–	7
Buffalo	1	–	7	1	–	10
Kent State	0	–	8	1	–	10
West Division
Northern Illinois xy	6	–	2	7	–	5
Toledo x	6	–	2	9	–	3
Western Michigan	5	–	3	7	–	4
Central Michigan	5	–	3	6	–	5
Ball State	4	–	4	4	–	7
Eastern Michigan	3	–	5	4	–	7
Championship: Akron 31, NIU 30
$ – Conference champion; x – Division champion/co-champions

The 2005 Akron Zips football team represented the University of Akron in the 2005 NCAA Division I-A football season. Akron competed as a member of the East Division of the Mid-American Conference (MAC) The Zips were led by J. D. Brookhart in his second year as head coach. Brookhart would lead Akron to its first MAC title, upsetting Northern Illinois 31-30 in the conference championship game.

== Schedule ==
Date	Time	Opponent	Site	TV	Result	Attendance
September 10	12:00 p.m.	at No. 13 Purdue*	Ross–Ade Stadium; West Lafayette, IN	ESPN360	L 24–49	64,757
September 17	5:00 p.m.	at Middle Tennessee*	Johnny "Red" Floyd Stadium; Murfreesboro, TN		W 17–7	12,411
September 24	6:00 p.m.	Northern Illinois	Rubber Bowl; Akron, OH		W 48–42 ^{OT}	15,612
October 1	6:00 p.m.	Central Michigan	Rubber Bowl; Akron, OH		L 17–31	10,093
October 8	1:30 p.m.	at Buffalo	University at Buffalo Stadium; Amherst, NY		W 13–7	8,279
October 15	2:00 p.m.	at Miami (OH)	Yager Stadium; Oxford, OH		L 23–51	14,312
October 22	6:00 p.m.	Army*	Rubber Bowl; Akron, OH		L 0–20	12,203
October 29	4:00 p.m.	at Bowling Green	Doyt Perry Stadium; Bowling Green, OH		W 24–14	9,608
November 5	2:00 p.m.	at Ball State	Scheumann Stadium; Muncie, IN		L 17–23	10,401
November 15	7:30 p.m.	Ohio	Rubber Bowl; Akron, OH	ESPNU	W 27–3	7,614
November 24	10:00 a.m.	Kent State	Rubber Bowl; Akron, OH (Wagon Wheel)	ESPNU	W 35–3	8,942
December 1	7:45 p.m.	vs. Northern Illinois*	Ford Field; Detroit, MI (MAC Championship Game)	ESPN	W 31–30	12,051
December 26	4:00 p.m.	vs. Memphis*	Ford Field; Detroit, MI (Motor City Bowl)	ESPN	L 31–38	50,616
*Non-conference game; Rankings from AP Poll released prior to the game; All times are in Eastern time
