= 2005 Eastern Michigan Eagles football team =

American college football season

2005 Eastern Michigan Eagles football
- Conference: Mid-American Conference
- West
- Record: 4–7 (3–5 MAC)
- Head coach: Jeff Genyk (2nd season)
- Offensive coordinator: Howard Feggins (2nd season)
- Home stadium: Rynearson Stadium

2005 Mid-American Conference football standings
	Conf.			Overall
Team	W		L	W		L
East Division
Akron xy$	5	–	3	7	–	6
Miami (OH) x	5	–	3	7	–	4
Bowling Green x	5	–	3	6	–	5
Ohio	3	–	5	4	–	7
Buffalo	1	–	7	1	–	10
Kent State	0	–	8	1	–	10
West Division
Northern Illinois xy	6	–	2	7	–	5
Toledo x	6	–	2	9	–	3
Western Michigan	5	–	3	7	–	4
Central Michigan	5	–	3	6	–	5
Ball State	4	–	4	4	–	7
Eastern Michigan	3	–	5	4	–	7
Championship: Akron 31, NIU 30
$ – Conference champion; x – Division champion/co-champions

The 2005 Eastern Michigan Eagles football team represented Eastern Michigan University during the 2005 NCAA Division I-A football season. Eastern Michigan competed as a member of the Mid-American Conference (MAC) West Division. The team was coached by Jeff Genyk and played their homes game in Rynearson Stadium.

== Schedule ==
Date	Time	Opponent	Site	TV	Result	Attendance
September 1	7:00 pm	at Cincinnati*	Nippert Stadium; Cincinnati, OH		L 26–28	21,458
September 10	6:00 pm	Louisiana–Lafayette*	Rynearson Stadium; Ypsilanti, MI		W 31–10	5,628
September 17	12:00 pm	at No. 14 Michigan*	Michigan Stadium; Ann Arbor, MI	ESPN+	L 0–55	109,511
September 24	1:00 pm	at Central Michigan	Kelly/Shorts Stadium; Mount Pleasant, MI (rivalry)	CL	W 23–20 ^{OT}	15,013
October 1	2:00 pm	Kent State^{†}	Rynearson Stadium; Ypsilanti, MI		W 27–20	6,294
October 8	7:00 pm	at Toledo	Glass Bowl; Toledo, OH		L 3–30	25,266
October 15	4:00 pm	at Northern Illinois	Huskie Stadium; DeKalb, IL		L 8–24	27,641
October 22	6:00 pm	Miami (OH)	Rynearson Stadium; Ypsilanti, MI	CL	L 23–24	5,785
November 5	1:00 pm	Western Michigan	Ford Field; Detroit, MI (Michigan MAC Trophy)	CL	L 36–44	11,191
November 12	6:00 pm	Ball State	Rynearson Stadium; Ypsilanti, MI	CL	L 25–26	3,167
November 19	1:30 pm	at Buffalo	University at Buffalo Stadium; Amherst, NY		W 38–14	6,423
*Non-conference game; ^{†}Homecoming; Rankings from AP Poll released prior to the game; All times are in Eastern time
