= 2005 Western Michigan Broncos football team =

American college football season

2005 Western Michigan Broncos football
- Conference: Mid-American Conference
- West Division
- Record: 7–4 (5–3 MAC)
- Head coach: Bill Cubit (1st season)
- Offensive coordinator: George McDonald (1st season)
- Offensive scheme: Multiple
- Base defense: Multiple
- Home stadium: Waldo Stadium

2005 Mid-American Conference football standings
	Conf.			Overall
Team	W		L	W		L
East Division
Akron xy$	5	–	3	7	–	6
Miami (OH) x	5	–	3	7	–	4
Bowling Green x	5	–	3	6	–	5
Ohio	3	–	5	4	–	7
Buffalo	1	–	7	1	–	10
Kent State	0	–	8	1	–	10
West Division
Northern Illinois xy	6	–	2	7	–	5
Toledo x	6	–	2	9	–	3
Western Michigan	5	–	3	7	–	4
Central Michigan	5	–	3	6	–	5
Ball State	4	–	4	4	–	7
Eastern Michigan	3	–	5	4	–	7
Championship: Akron 31, NIU 30
$ – Conference champion; x – Division champion/co-champions

The 2005 Western Michigan Broncos football team represented Western Michigan University in the 2005 NCAA Division I-A football season. They competed as members of the Mid-American Conference in the West Division. The team was coached by Bill Cubit and played their homes game in Waldo Stadium in Kalamazoo, Michigan.

The Broncos won the Michigan MAC Trophy and the WMU–CMU Rivalry Trophy.

== Schedule ==
Date	Time	Opponent	Site	TV	Result	Attendance	Source
September 3	6:00 pm	at No. 23 Virginia*	Scott Stadium; Charlottesville, VA	ESPN360	L 19–31	61,244	
September 10	7:00 pm	at Toledo	Glass Bowl; Toledo, OH	CL	L 23–56	18,912	
September 17	7:00 pm	No. 1 (I-AA) Southern Illinois*	Waldo Stadium; Kalamazoo, MI		W 34–28	24,497	
September 24	1:00 pm	at Temple	Lincoln Financial Field; Philadelphia, PA		W 19–16	8,922	
October 1	7:00 pm	Buffalo	Waldo Stadium; Kalamazoo, MI		W 31–21	14,198	
October 8	7:00 pm	Ball State	Waldo Stadium; Kalamazoo, MI	CL	L 57–60 ^{5OT}	18,183	
October 22	4:00 pm	at Bowling Green	Doyt Perry Stadium; Bowling Green, OH		W 45–14	13,959	
October 29	2:00 pm	Kent State^{†}	Waldo Stadium; Kalamazoo, MI	CL	W 44–14	14,168	
November 5	1:00 pm	at Eastern Michigan	Ford Field; Detroit, MI (Michigan MAC Trophy)	CL	W 44–36	11,191	
November 12	2:00 pm	Central Michigan	Waldo Stadium; Kalamazoo, MI (rivalry)	ESPN Plus	W 31–24	23,484	
November 23	1:30 pm	at Northern Illinois	Huskie Stadium; DeKalb, IL	ESPN2	L 7–42	18,361	
*Non-conference game; ^{†}Homecoming; Rankings from AP Poll released prior to the game; All times are in Eastern time

== Roster ==
2005 Western Michigan Broncos football team roster
Players
Coaches
Offense

Pos.	#	Name	Class
WR	15	Greg Jennings	Sr
TE	85	Tony Scheffler	Sr

Defense

Pos.	#	Name	Class

Special teams

Pos.	#	Name	Class

Head coach

- Bill Cubit

Coordinators/assistant coaches

- George McDonald – Offensive coordinator / wide receivers

Legend

- (C) Team captain
- (S) Suspended
- (I) Ineligible
- Injured
- Redshirt
