= 2005 Ball State Cardinals football team =

American college football season

2005 Ball State Cardinals football
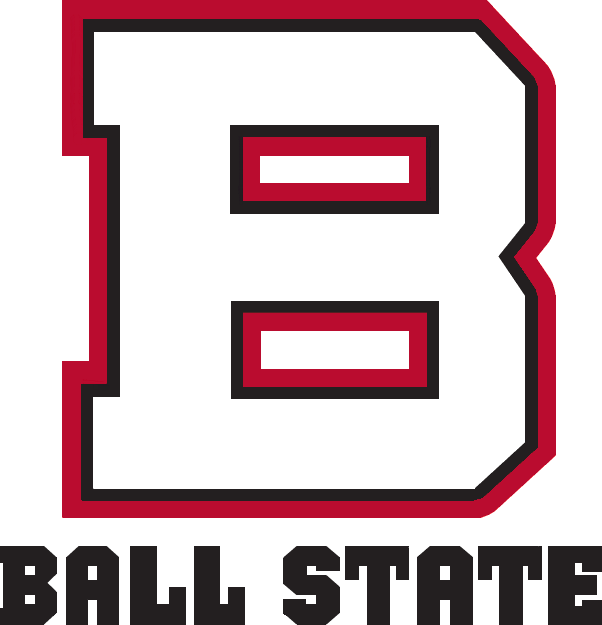
- Conference: Mid-American Conference
- West
- Record: 4–7 (4–4 MAC)
- Head coach: Brady Hoke (3rd season)
- Home stadium: Ball State Stadium

2005 Mid-American Conference football standings
	Conf.			Overall
Team	W		L	W		L
East Division
Akron xy$	5	–	3	7	–	6
Miami (OH) x	5	–	3	7	–	4
Bowling Green x	5	–	3	6	–	5
Ohio	3	–	5	4	–	7
Buffalo	1	–	7	1	–	10
Kent State	0	–	8	1	–	10
West Division
Northern Illinois xy	6	–	2	7	–	5
Toledo x	6	–	2	9	–	3
Western Michigan	5	–	3	7	–	4
Central Michigan	5	–	3	6	–	5
Ball State	4	–	4	4	–	7
Eastern Michigan	3	–	5	4	–	7
Championship: Akron 31, NIU 30
$ – Conference champion; x – Division champion/co-champions

The 2005 Ball State Cardinals football team represented Ball State University during the 2005 NCAA Division I-A football season. Ball State competed as a member of the West Division of the Mid-American Conference (MAC). The Cardinals were led by Brady Hoke in his third year as head coach.

== Schedule ==
Date	Time	Opponent	Site	TV	Result	Attendance
September 3	12:00 pm	at No. 11 Iowa*	Kinnick Stadium; Iowa City, IA	ESPN Plus	L 0–56	70,585
September 10	8:00 pm	Bowling Green	Ball State Stadium; Muncie, IN		L 31–40	17,460
September 17	2:30 pm	at Auburn*	Jordan-Hare Stadium; Auburn, AL	PPV	L 3–63	78,427
October 1	1:00 pm	at No. 21 Boston College*	Alumni Stadium; Chestnut Hill, MA		L 0–38	40,162
October 8	7:00 pm	at Western Michigan	Waldo Stadium; Kalamazoo, MI	CL	W 60–57 ^{5OT}	18,183
October 15	3:00 pm	Toledo^{†}	Ball State Stadium; Muncie, IN		L 14–34	16,533
October 22	2:00 pm	at Ohio	Peden Stadium; Athens, OH	ESPN Plus	L 21–38	17,959
October 29	4:05 pm	at Northern Illinois	Huskie Stadium; DeKalb, IL (rivalry)	ESPN Plus	W 31–17	18,732
November 5	2:00 pm	Akron	Ball State Stadium; Muncie, IN		W 23–17	10,401
November 12	6:00 pm	at Eastern Michigan	Rynearson Stadium; Ypsilanti, MI	CL	W 26–25	3,167
November 19	12:00 pm	Central Michigan	Ball State Stadium; Muncie, IN	CL	L 24–31 ^{OT}	7,386
*Non-conference game; ^{†}Homecoming; Rankings from AP Poll released prior to the game; All times are in Eastern time
