= 2005 GMAC Bowl =

Toledo Rockets	UTEP Miners
(8–3)	(8–3)
MAC	C-USA
45	13
Head coach: Tom Amstutz	Head coach: Mike Price
	1	2	3	4	Total
Toledo	7	21	3	14	45
UTEP	3	10	0	0	13
- Date: December 21, 2005
- Season: 2005
- Stadium: Ladd–Peebles Stadium
- Location: Mobile, Alabama
- MVP: Bruce Gradkowski (QB, Toledo)
- Referee: Penn Wagers (SEC)
- Attendance: 35,422

United States TV coverage
- Network: ESPN
- Announcers: Ron Franklin, Bob Davie, Holly Rowe

The 2005 GMAC Bowl was an American college football bowl game. It was part of the 2005 NCAA Division I-A football season, and was the 8th edition. It was played in December 2005, and featured the UTEP Miners and the Toledo Rockets.

== Scoring summary ==
Toledo scored first on a 10-yard touchdown pass from quarterback Bruce Gradkowski to wide receiver John Allen. Reagan Schneider of UTEP kicked a 34-yard field goal at the end of the first quarter to make the lead 7-3. In the second quarter, Gradkowski threw a 33-yard touchdown pass to David Washington Jr. to make the lead 14-3 Toledo. With 5:46 in the half, quarterback Jordan Palmer found wide receiver Johnnie Lee Higgins for an 18-yard touchdown pass. The extra point made the score 14-10 Toledo.

With 2:56 left in the half, Schneider drilled a 23-yard field goal to cut the lead to 14-13. With 1:13 left, Gradkoski found Steve Odom for a 31-yard touchdown pass that extended the lead to 21-13. With only 10 seconds left in the half, Palmer threw an interception to David Thomas that was returned 37 yards for a Toledo touchdown. Toledo led 28-13 at the half. In the third quarter, Jason Robbins kicked a 29-yard field goal to give Toledo a 31-13 lead. Touchdown passes to Josh Powell and Chris Hopkins gave Toledo a 45-13 win.

== Statistics ==
Statistics	Toledo	UTEP
First downs	25	16
Rushing attempts-Yards	39-164	28-63
Passing yards	304	192
Passes	19-32-2	17-41-2
Total offense	71-468	69-255
Fumbles-Lost	1-1	1-0
Interceptions-Yards	2-37	2-16
Penalties-Yards	9-80	4-45
Punts-Average	1-35	5-35.4
Punt returns-Yards	1-4	1-1
Kickoff returns-Yards	8-410	4-234
Sacks by: Number-Yards	3-28	0-0
Time of Possession	32:05	27:55

== Point shaving ==
In 2007, members of the Toledo football team were charged with participating in a point shaving scandal. Members of the football team were connected with Detroit-area gamblers and were paid to intentionally affect the final score so that certain point spreads were covered. The 2005 GMAC Bowl was mentioned as a game that was affected.

In 2011, Toledo running back Quinton Broussard pleaded guilty in connection with the point scandal. In the plea, Broussard admitted to receiving $500 for intentionally losing a fumble in the first half, when Toledo held a small lead.
