= 2005 Northern Illinois Huskies football team =

American college football season

2005 Northern Illinois Huskies football

MAC West co-champion

MAC Championship Game, L 30–31 vs. Akron
- Conference: Mid-American Conference
- West Division
- Record: 7–5 (6–2 MAC)
- Head coach: Joe Novak (10th season)
- Offensive coordinator: John Bond (2nd season)
- Defensive coordinator: Denny Doornbos (2nd season)
- MVP: Garrett Wolfe
- Captains: A. J. Harris; Ray Smith; Brian Van Acker
- Home stadium: Huskie Stadium

2005 Mid-American Conference football standings
	Conf.			Overall
Team	W		L	W		L
East Division
Akron xy$	5	–	3	7	–	6
Miami (OH) x	5	–	3	7	–	4
Bowling Green x	5	–	3	6	–	5
Ohio	3	–	5	4	–	7
Buffalo	1	–	7	1	–	10
Kent State	0	–	8	1	–	10
West Division
Northern Illinois xy	6	–	2	7	–	5
Toledo x	6	–	2	9	–	3
Western Michigan	5	–	3	7	–	4
Central Michigan	5	–	3	6	–	5
Ball State	4	–	4	4	–	7
Eastern Michigan	3	–	5	4	–	7
Championship: Akron 31, NIU 30
$ – Conference champion; x – Division champion/co-champions

The 2005 Northern Illinois Huskies football team represented Northern Illinois University as a member of the West Division of the Mid-American Conference (MAC) during the 2005 NCAA Division I-A football season. Led by tenth-year head coach Joe Novak, the Huskies compiled an overall record of 7–5 with a mark of 6–2 in conference play, sharing the MAC's West Division title with Toledo. By virtue of their head-to-head win over Toledo, Northern Illinois advanced to the MAC Championship Game, where they lost to Akron. Despite reaching bowl eligibility, the Huskies were not invited to a bowl game. The team played home games at Huskie Stadium in DeKalb, Illinois.

== Schedule ==
Date	Time	Opponent	Site	TV	Result	Attendance
September 3	2:30 pm	at No. 4 Michigan*	Michigan Stadium; Ann Arbor, MI	ABC	L 17–33	110,971
September 10	4:00 pm	at Northwestern*	Ryan Field; Evanston, IL	ESPNC	L 37–38	35,114
September 17	1:00 pm	Tennessee Tech*	Huskie Stadium; DeKalb, IL	CSNC	W 42–3	26,123
September 24	5:00 pm	at Akron	Rubber Bowl; Akron, OH		L 42–48 ^{OT}	15,612
October 5	7:30 pm	Miami(OH)	Huskie Stadium; DeKalb, IL	ESPN2	W 38–27	20,023
October 15	3:00 pm	Eastern Michigan^{†}	Huskie Stadium; DeKalb, IL	CSNC	W 24–8	27,641
October 22	12:00 pm	at Kent State	Dix Stadium; Kent, OH		W 34–3	3,554
October 29	1:00 pm	Ball State	Huskie Stadium; DeKalb, IL (rivalry)	ESPN Plus	L 17–31	18,732
November 5	12:00 pm	at Central Michigan	Kelly/Shorts Stadium; Mount Pleasant, MI		W 31–28	13,812
November 16	6:30 pm	at Toledo	Glass Bowl; Toledo, OH	ESPN2	W 35–17	20,912
November 23	1:00 pm	Western Michigan	Huskie Stadium; DeKalb, IL	ESPN2	W 42–7	18,361
December 1	6:30 pm	vs. Akron*	Ford Field; Detroit, MI (MAC Championship Game)	ESPN	L 30–31	12,051
*Non-conference game; ^{†}Homecoming; Rankings from AP Poll released prior to the game; All times are in Central time
