= Derby Downs =

Coordinates: 41.038108°N 81.457569°W

Finish line bridge at Derby Downs

Derby Downs, in Akron, Ohio, has been the home track of the All American Soap Box Derby since it was built as a Works Progress Administration project in the late 1930s. The three-lane asphalt track starts near the top of George Washington Boulevard and drops in a straight line down the wooded hill in the shadow of the Rubber Bowl, ending under final approach for runway 25 of Akron Fulton International Airport. Entry to the facility is through its main gate, which is located at 41.035110, -81.458189. Many people every year come to the "Downs". Before the All American Soap Box Derby even starts they still use the track for the local competitors. During that time they only use two lanes of the three. There are three car categories (divisions) each having a different type of car: Stock, Super Stock, and Masters. They only race their own categories. Each time a competitor has to race down the hill they race twice. Each time they go down it is called a Phase, and two Phases are called a Heat. When going down the track just nudging the steering wheel may cost you the heat. A win is determined by a fraction of a second. Rarely do they ever get a tie or a Dead heat especially during the All American Soap Box Derby.

Starting in 2014, Derby Downs will rent lights for nighttime events.

The length of the track has changed multiple times since 1936.

1936–1939 (1,175 feet)
1946–1970 (975.4 feet)
1971–1999(953.75 feet)
2000–present (989.4 feet)

Since 1935, the All-American Soap Box Derby has taken place in Akron, Ohio. In 1936, Akron city officials decided to build a permanent facility for the race. With the assistance of the Works Progress Administration, one of President Franklin Delano Roosevelt's New Deal programs, the city completed Derby Downs, a soap box racetrack. The All-American Soap Box Derby is quite popular. Thousands of children from across the United States and from other nations have come to race their creations at Derby Downs every year since the track's completion. The race is typically held in July each year. Children build and race their own racecars either from their own designs or from prefabricated kits that can be purchased from vendors. The cars are not powered by gasoline or any other type of fuel. There are three different levels of racing at Derby Downs. There is the Stock Division for children ages 8-17 that build simplified cars from kits. Then there is the Super Stock Division for children also ages 8-17. They can build larger, faster cars from kits. The last level is the Masters Division for children ages 10-17 that build more sophisticated and faster cars from kits or using their own materials. The winner was the child that reached the bottom of the hill first.
