= Jim Burrow =

American gridiron football player and coach (born 1953)

No. 41, 16
- Position: Defensive back

Personal information
- Born: November 29, 1953 (age 72); Hampton, Virginia, U.S.
- Listed height: 5 ft 11 in (1.80 m)
- Listed weight: 181 lb (82 kg)

Career information
- High school: Amory (Amory, Mississippi)
- College: Nebraska (1972–1975)
- NFL draft: 1976: 8th round, 218th overall pick

Career history

Playing
- Green Bay Packers (1976); Montreal Alouettes (1977–1980); Calgary Stampeders (1980); Ottawa Rough Riders (1981)

Coaching
- Washington State (1981) Tight ends coach; Washington State (1982–1986) Defensive backs coach; Iowa State (1987–1993) Defensive backs coach; Iowa State (1994) Co-defensive coordinator & defensive backs coach; Ames HS (IA) (1995–1998) Assistant coach; Ames HS (IA) (1999–2000) Head coach; Nebraska (2001–2002) Graduate assistant; North Dakota State (2003–2004) Defensive coordinator; Ohio (2005–2016) Defensive coordinator; Ohio (2017–2018) Associate head coach & defensive coordinator

Awards and highlights
- Grey Cup champion (1977); 2× CFL East All-Star (1978, 1979); Second-team All-Big Eight (1975)

Career NFL statistics
- Games played: 3
- Stats at Pro Football Reference

Career CFL statistics
- Games played: 54
- Interceptions: 17
- Fumble recoveries: 4
- Return yards: 59

James Arthur Burrow (born November 29, 1953), commonly known as Jimmy Burrow, is an American former professional football defensive back in the Canadian Football League (CFL) and National Football League (NFL) and retired college football coach. He is the father of Joe Burrow.

Burrow played college football at the University of Nebraska–Lincoln. He was selected by the Green Bay Packers in the eighth round of the 1976 NFL draft and played that season with the team. Following his time with the Packers, he played in the CFL with the Montreal Alouettes, Calgary Stampeders, and Ottawa Rough Riders.

Burrow's last coaching position was as defensive coordinator for Ohio University from 2005 until his retirement after the 2018 season. At the time of his retirement, he had been one of the longest-tenured coordinators in Division I football. He was associate head coach from 2017 until his retirement. For his efforts, Burrow was named Scout.com's 2009 MAC Defensive Coordinator of the Year.

Burrow previously coached at various positions for, respectively, Washington State, Iowa State, Ames High School, Nebraska, and North Dakota State. He timed his retirement from coaching to coincide with the final college football season of his son Joe Burrow, who played at LSU in 2019. The elder Burrow publicly acknowledged that his wish to attend all of his son's 2019 games played a role in his retirement decision.
