= 2005 Miami RedHawks football team =

American college football season

2005 Miami RedHawks football

MAC East Division co-champion
- Conference: Mid-American Conference
- East Division
- Record: 7–4 (5–3 MAC)
- Head coach: Shane Montgomery (1st season)
- Offensive scheme: Multiple
- Defensive coordinator: Taver Johnson (1st season)
- Base defense: 4–3
- Home stadium: Yager Stadium

2005 Mid-American Conference football standings
	Conf.			Overall
Team	W		L	W		L
East Division
Akron xy$	5	–	3	7	–	6
Miami (OH) x	5	–	3	7	–	4
Bowling Green x	5	–	3	6	–	5
Ohio	3	–	5	4	–	7
Buffalo	1	–	7	1	–	10
Kent State	0	–	8	1	–	10
West Division
Northern Illinois xy	6	–	2	7	–	5
Toledo x	6	–	2	9	–	3
Western Michigan	5	–	3	7	–	4
Central Michigan	5	–	3	6	–	5
Ball State	4	–	4	4	–	7
Eastern Michigan	3	–	5	4	–	7
Championship: Akron 31, NIU 30
$ – Conference champion; x – Division champion/co-champions

The 2005 Miami RedHawks football team represented the Miami University in the 2005 NCAA Division I-A football season. They played their home games at Yager Stadium in Oxford, Ohio and competed as members of the Mid-American Conference. The team was coached by head coach Shane Montgomery.

== Schedule ==
Date	Time	Opponent	Site	TV	Result	Attendance
September 3	12:00 pm	at No. 6 Ohio State*	Ohio Stadium; Columbus, OH	ABC	L 14–34	104,695
September 10	2:00 pm	Central Michigan^{†}	Yager Stadium; Oxford, OH		L 37–38	16,956
September 17	4:00 pm	at Kent State	Dix Stadium; Kent, OH		W 27–10	14,002
September 28	7:00 pm	Cincinnati*	Yager Stadium; Oxford, OH (Victory Bell)	ESPN2	W 44–16	19,163
October 5	6:30 pm	at Northern Illinois	Huskie Stadium; DeKalb, IL	ESPN2	L 27–38	20,023
October 15	2:00 pm	Akron	Yager Stadium; Oxford, OH		W 51–23	14,312
October 22	6:00 pm	at Eastern Michigan	Rynearson Stadium; Ypsilanti, MI		W 24–23	5,785
October 29	1:00 pm	at Temple*	Lincoln Financial Field; Philadelphia, PA		W 41–14	11,257
November 5	2:00 pm	Buffalo	Yager Stadium; Oxford, OH		W 54–13	20,023
November 15	7:00 pm	Bowling Green	Yager Stadium; Oxford, OH	ESPN2	L 14–42	5,749
November 21	7:30 pm	at Ohio	Peden Stadium; Athens, OH (Battle of the Bricks)	ESPNU	W 38–7	9,908
*Non-conference game; ^{†}Homecoming; Rankings from AP Poll released prior to the game; All times are in Eastern time
