= 2005 Navy Midshipmen football team =

American college football season

2005 Navy Midshipmen football
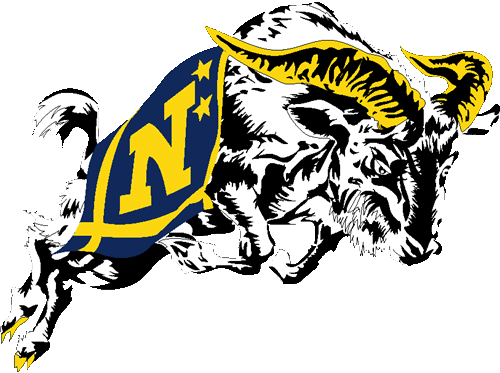

Poinsettia Bowl champion

Poinsettia Bowl, W 51–30 vs. Colorado State
- Conference: Independent
- Record: 8–4
- Head coach: Paul Johnson (4th season)
- Offensive scheme: Triple option
- Defensive coordinator: Buddy Green (4th season)
- Base defense: Multiple
- MVP: Lamar Owens
- Captains: Lamar Owens; Jeremy Chase
- Home stadium: Navy–Marine Corps Memorial Stadium

2005 NCAA Division I-A independents football records
	Conf.			Overall
Team	W		L	W		L
No. 9 Notre Dame %		–		9	–	3
Navy		–		8	–	4
Army		–		4	–	7
Temple		–		0	–	11
% – BCS at-large representative; Rankings from AP Poll

The 2005 Navy Midshipmen football team represented the United States Naval Academy (USNA) as an independent during the 2005 NCAA Division I-A football season. The team was led by fourth-year head coach Paul Johnson.

Navy won the 2005 Poinsettia Bowl, beating Colorado State by a score of 51–30.

== Schedule ==
Date	Time	Opponent	Site	TV	Result	Attendance
September 3	6:00 p.m.	Maryland	M&T Bank Stadium; Baltimore, MD (Crab Bowl Classic)	CSTV	L 20–23	67,809
September 10	6:00 p.m.	Stanford	Navy–Marine Corps Memorial Stadium; Annapolis, MD	CSTV	L 38–41	35,670
October 1	1:00 p.m.	at Duke	Wallace Wade Stadium; Durham, NC		W 28–21	15,246
October 8	1:30 p.m.	Air Force	Navy–Marine Corps Memorial Stadium; Annapolis, MD (Commander-in-Chief's Trophy)	CSTV	W 27–24	35,211
October 15	1:30 p.m.	Kent State	Navy–Marine Corps Memorial Stadium; Annapolis, MD	CSTV	W 34–31	30,316
October 22	5:00 p.m.	at Rice	Rice Stadium; Houston, TX		W 41–9	12,714
October 29	3:30 p.m.	at Rutgers	Rutgers Stadium; Piscataway, NJ		L 31–41	41,716
November 5	1:30 p.m.	Tulane	Navy–Marine Corps Memorial Stadium; Annapolis, MD	CSTV	W 49–21	33,608
November 12	1:00 p.m.	at No. 7 Notre Dame	Notre Dame Stadium; Notre Dame, IN (rivalry)	NBC	L 21–42	80,795
November 19	1:30 p.m.	Temple	Navy–Marine Corps Memorial Stadium; Annapolis, MD	CSTV	W 38–17	30,261
December 3	2:30 p.m.	vs. Army	Lincoln Financial Field; Philadelphia, PA (Army–Navy Game)	CBS	W 42–23	69,322
December 22	8:30 p.m.	vs. Colorado State	Qualcomm Stadium; San Diego, CA (Poinsettia Bowl)	ESPN2	W 51–30	36,842
Rankings from AP Poll released prior to the game; All times are in Eastern time
