= 2005 Buffalo Bulls football team =

American college football season

2005 Buffalo Bulls football
- Conference: Mid-American Conference
- East Division
- Record: 1–10 (1–7 MAC)
- Head coach: Jim Hofher (5th season)
- Captains: Bryan Cummings; Kirk Berry; Michael Schifano; Gemara Williams
- Home stadium: University at Buffalo Stadium

2005 Mid-American Conference football standings
	Conf.			Overall
Team	W		L	W		L
East Division
Akron xy$	5	–	3	7	–	6
Miami (OH) x	5	–	3	7	–	4
Bowling Green x	5	–	3	6	–	5
Ohio	3	–	5	4	–	7
Buffalo	1	–	7	1	–	10
Kent State	0	–	8	1	–	10
West Division
Northern Illinois xy	6	–	2	7	–	5
Toledo x	6	–	2	9	–	3
Western Michigan	5	–	3	7	–	4
Central Michigan	5	–	3	6	–	5
Ball State	4	–	4	4	–	7
Eastern Michigan	3	–	5	4	–	7
Championship: Akron 31, NIU 30
$ – Conference champion; x – Division champion/co-champions

The 2005 Buffalo Bulls football team represented the University at Buffalo as a member of the Mid-American Conference (MAC) during the 2005 NCAA Division I-AA football season. Led by Jim Hofher in his fifth and final season as head coach, the Bulls compiled an overall record of 1–10 with a mark of 1–7 in conference play, placing fifth in the MAC's East Division. The team played home games at the University at Buffalo Stadium in Amherst, New York.

Buffalo did not score a touchdown until the fourth game of the season.

== Schedule ==
Date	Time	Opponent	Site	TV	Result	Attendance
September 1	7:30 pm	at Connecticut*	Rentschler Field; East Hartford, CT		L 0–38	40,000
September 10	3:30 pm	at Syracuse*	Carrier Dome; Syracuse, NY		L 0–31	34,442
September 17	8:00 pm	Rutgers*	University at Buffalo Stadium; Amherst, NY	YES	L 3–17	17,620
October 1	7:00 pm	at Western Michigan	Waldo Stadium; Kalamazoo, MI		L 21–31	14,198
October 8	1:30 pm	Akron^{†}	University at Buffalo Stadium; Amherst, NY		L 7–13	8,279
October 15	1:30 pm	Bowling Green	University at Buffalo Stadium; Amherst, NY		L 7–27	6,436
October 22	7:00 pm	at Toledo	Glass Bowl; Toledo, OH		L 15–38	23,904
October 29	1:30 pm	Ohio	University at Buffalo Stadium; Amherst, NY		L 20–34	5,814
November 5	2:00 pm	at Miami (OH)	Yager Stadium; Oxford, OH		L 13–54	20,023
November 12	1:00 pm	at Kent State	Dix Stadium; Kent, OH		W 10–6	3,151
November 19	1:30 pm	Eastern Michigan	University at Buffalo Stadium; Amherst, NY		L 14–38	6,423
*Non-conference game; ^{†}Homecoming; All times are in Eastern time
