= 2005 MAC Championship Game =

2005 Marathon MAC Championship Game
- Conference Championship
Akron Zips	Northern Illinois Huskies
(6–5)	(7–4)
31	30
Head coach: J.D. Brookhart	Head coach: Joe Novak
	1	2	3	4	Total
Akron	10	0	0	21	31
Northern Illinois	0	10	14	6	30
- Date: December 1, 2005
- Season: 2005
- Stadium: Ford Field
- Location: Detroit, Michigan
- MVP: QB Luke Getsy (Akron)
- Favorite: Northern Illinois by 13
- Referee: Bill Alge
- Attendance: 12,051

United States TV coverage
- Network: ESPN
- Announcers: Mike Tirico, Kirk Herbstreit, Erin Andrews

2005 Mid-American Conference football standings
	Conf.			Overall
Team	W		L	W		L
East Division
Akron xy$	5	–	3	7	–	6
Miami (OH) x	5	–	3	7	–	4
Bowling Green x	5	–	3	6	–	5
Ohio	3	–	5	4	–	7
Buffalo	1	–	7	1	–	10
Kent State	0	–	8	1	–	10
West Division
Northern Illinois xy	6	–	2	7	–	5
Toledo x	6	–	2	9	–	3
Western Michigan	5	–	3	7	–	4
Central Michigan	5	–	3	6	–	5
Ball State	4	–	4	4	–	7
Eastern Michigan	3	–	5	4	–	7
Championship: Akron 31, NIU 30
$ – Conference champion; x – Division champion/co-champions

The 2005 MAC Championship Game was played on December 1, 2005, at Ford Field in Detroit, Michigan. The game featured the Akron Zips, winners of the Mid-American Conference East Division, and the Northern Illinois Huskies, winners of the West Division.

Down 14 points the fourth quarter, the Zips manufactured a comeback. Northern Illinois led by 6 points with 17 seconds remaining in regulation when Luke Getsy connected with Domenik Hixon on a 36-yard touchdown pass. This and the subsequent successful extra point attempt would prove to be the game winning plays. Their victory earned the Akron football program its first MAC championship and bowl game berth.
