= Omar Jacobs =

American football player (born 1984)

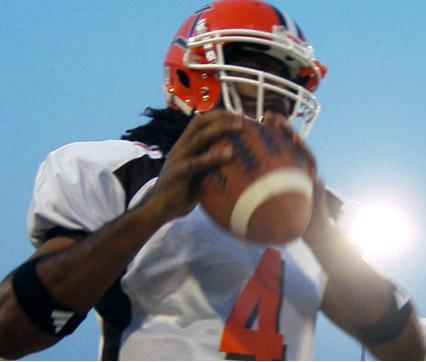

No. 4
- Position: Quarterback

Personal information
- Born: March 3, 1984 (age 42); Delray Beach, Florida, U.S.
- Listed height: 6 ft 4 in (1.93 m)
- Listed weight: 235 lb (107 kg)

Career information
- High school: Atlantic (Delray Beach)
- College: Bowling Green (2002–2005)
- NFL draft: 2006: 5th round, 164th overall pick

Career history
- Pittsburgh Steelers (2006)*; Philadelphia Eagles (2006)*; Kansas City Chiefs (2007)*; Florence Phantoms (2008–2009); San Jose Wolves (2010); Jacksonville Sharks (2010–2012); Wichita Falls Nighthawks (2013–2014); Rio Grande Valley Sol (2015)
- * Offseason or practice squad member only

Awards and highlights
- ArenaBowl champion (2011); AIFA League MVP (2008); AIFA Bowl II MVP (2008); All-AIFA (2008); First-team All-MAC (2004); MAC Offensive Player of the Year (2004)

Career AFL statistics
- Completions: 146
- Attempts: 228
- Passing yards: 1,755
- TD–INT: 38–9
- Stats at ArenaFan.com

Omar T. Jacobs (born March 3, 1984) is an American former professional football quarterback. He played college football at Bowling Green and was selected by the Pittsburgh Steelers in the fifth round of the 2006 NFL draft. Jacobs was also a member of the Philadelphia Eagles, Kansas City Chiefs, Florence Phantoms, San Jose Wolves, Jacksonville Sharks, Wichita Falls Nighthawks, and Rio Grande Valley Sol.

== Early life ==
Jacobs graduated from Atlantic Community High School in Delray Beach, Florida. His senior year (2002), he led his team to Florida's state semifinals, throwing for 300 yards and three touchdowns in a loss. He was also awarded Palm Beach County player of the year honors and 2nd team All-State honors.

== College career ==
In 2004, his sophomore season, Jacobs set the record for the best touchdown-to-interception ratio in NCAA Division I-A history (10.25:1). In 2005, Jacobs was expected to contend for the Heisman Trophy, awarded to the year's best college football player, but an injury to his non-throwing shoulder considerably reduced his productivity.

Jacobs skipped his senior season at Bowling Green to enter the NFL draft. Jacobs left Bowling Green State University as the school's all-time leader in touchdown passes (71) and third in career passing yards (6,938).

=== Awards and honors ===
2004

- CNNSI.com honorable mention All-American
- MVP of the 2004 GMAC Bowl
- First-team All-MAC
- MAC Offensive Player of the Year
- Led the nation in touchdown passes with a MAC-record 41
- Led the nation in points responsible for per game (22.5)--his 45 touchdowns responsible for also was a MAC record
- Second nationally in total yards per game (358.5)--his 4,002 yards passing was the second highest total in the country
- Third nationally in passing efficiency (165.47)
- 41 touchdowns to four interceptions thrown was the best ratio in NCAA I-A history

2005

- Davey O'Brien Award semifinalist
- Two-time MAC East Offensive Player of the Week
- Second-team preseason All-American choice by The Sporting News
- Preseason candidate for the Maxwell Award and the Walter Camp Award

=== Statistics ===
Season	Team	Games			Passing								Rushing			
Season	Team	GP	GS	Record	Cmp	Att	Pct	Yds	Y/A	TD	Int	Rtg	Att	Yds	Avg	TD
2002	Bowling Green	0	0	—	Redshirted (redshirt)											
2003	Bowling Green	4	0	—	19	28	67.9	345	12.3	4	0	218.5	18	89	4.9	2
2004	Bowling Green	12	12	9–3	309	462	66.9	4,002	8.7	41	4	167.2	95	300	3.2	4
2005	Bowling Green	9	9	5–4	195	321	60.7	2,591	8.1	26	7	150.9	40	62	1.6	1
Career		25	21	14–7	523	811	64.5	6,938	8.6	71	11	162.5	153	451	2.9	7

== Professional career ==
Pre-draft measurables
Height	Weight	Arm length	Hand span	40-yard dash	10-yard split	20-yard split	20-yard shuttle	Three-cone drill	Vertical jump	Broad jump	Wonderlic
6 ft 3 7/8 in (1.93 m)	232 lb (105 kg)	33 3/4 in (0.86 m)	10 1/2 in (0.27 m)	4.84 s	1.69 s	2.83 s	4.29 s	7.47 s	32.5 in (0.83 m)	9 ft 0 in (2.74 m)	38
All values from NFL Combine

=== Pittsburgh Steelers ===
He was selected in the fifth round of the 2006 NFL draft, with the 164th overall pick, by the Pittsburgh Steelers. At the end of the preseason, he was sent to the practice squad. Jacobs was released from the practice squad and cut from the team following training camp.

=== Philadelphia Eagles ===
On November 21, 2006, he was signed to the Philadelphia Eagles practice squad and cut on January 3, 2007.

=== Kansas City Chiefs ===
On February 12, 2007, he was signed to the Kansas City Chiefs and allocated to NFL Europe where he was to play for the Berlin Thunder. However, prior to the start of the season, Jacobs was injured and spent the entire preseason on injured reserve. He was cut by the Chiefs on September 2.

=== Florence Phantoms ===
Before the Florence Phantoms 2008 season, Jacobs was signed to the roster where he would be the starting quarterback. Jacobs completed 208-362 passes for over 3,000 yards with 56 touchdowns and 12 interceptions to lead the Phantoms to their first ever AIFA Championship Bowl win. He also earned AIFA Championship Bowl II MVP, AIFA League MVP Award and All-AIFA honors. Jacobs had planned to move to the Arena Football League to play for the Tampa Bay Storm for the 2009 season, but when the AFL was canceled, he returned to Florence.

=== San Jose Wolves ===
On December 3, 2009, Jacobs was signed by the San Jose Wolves of the AIFA. Jacobs finished the 2009/2010 season with 5002 passing yards and 68 touchdowns, leading the Wolves to the playoffs and conference championship game in their inaugural season. Jacobs was expected to return for the 2010/11 season but was signed by the Jacksonville Sharks of the AFL during training camp.

=== Jacksonville Sharks ===
In 2010, Jacobs signed with the Jacksonville Sharks of the Arena Football League. He didn't see any playing time in 2010, and in 2011, he spent the season as the backup to Aaron Garcia. He would return in 2012 to compete with Chris Leak for the starting quarterback spot.

=== Wichita Falls Nighthawks ===
Jacobs played for the Wichita Falls Nighthawks from 2013 to 2014.

== Career statistics ==
AFL

Year	Team	Games			Passing								Rushing			
Year	Team	GP	GS	Record	Cmp	Att	Pct	Yds	Y/A	TD	Int	Rtg	Att	Yds	Y/A	TD
2011	JAX	5	0	—	18	24	75.0	279	11.6	7	0	152.6	12	17	0.7	1
2012	JAX	6	6	2–4	128	204	62.7	1,476	7.2	31	9	104.1	5	4	1.3	1
Career		11	6	2–4	146	228	64.0	1,755	7.7	38	9	110.7	17	21	0.8	2

== See also ==
- List of NCAA major college football yearly passing leaders
