= Bruce Gradkowski =

American football player (born 1983)

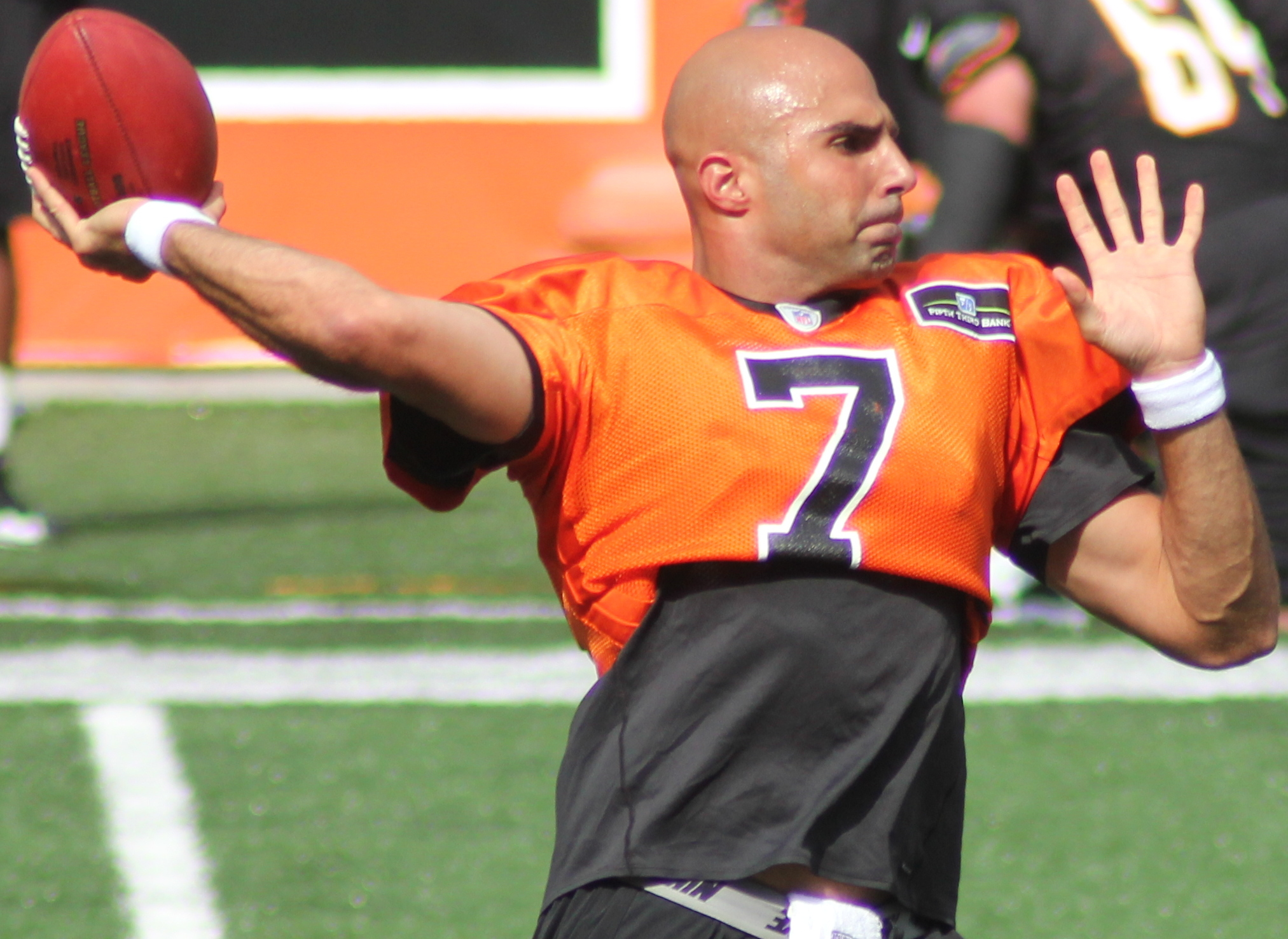
- Gradkowski with the Cincinnati Bengals in 2012

Detroit Lions
- Title: Assistant wide receivers coach

Personal information
- Born: January 27, 1983 (age 43); Pittsburgh, Pennsylvania, U.S.
- Listed height: 6 ft 1 in (1.85 m)
- Listed weight: 217 lb (98 kg)

Career information
- Position: Quarterback (No. 7, 5)
- High school: Seton-La Salle Catholic (Mt. Lebanon, Pennsylvania)
- College: Toledo (2001–2005)
- NFL draft: 2006: 6th round, 194th overall pick

Career history

Playing
- Tampa Bay Buccaneers (2006–2007); St. Louis Rams (2008)*; Cleveland Browns (2008); Oakland Raiders (2009–2010); Cincinnati Bengals (2011–2012); Pittsburgh Steelers (2013–2016)
- * Offseason or practice squad member only

Coaching
- Anthony Wayne HS (2017–2018) Volunteer assistant quarterbacks coach; St. Francis de Sales HS (2021) Head coach; Toledo (2022) Offensive analyst; St. Louis BattleHawks (2023–2024) Offensive coordinator; Detroit Lions (2025) Offensive assistant; Detroit Lions (2026–present) Assistant wide receivers coach

Awards and highlights
- 2× All-MAC (2001, 2004); MAC Co-Most Valuable Player (2005)

Career NFL statistics
- Passing attempts: 709
- Passing completions: 375
- Completion percentage: 52.9%
- TD–INT: 21–24
- Passing yards: 4,057
- Passer rating: 65.8
- Rushing yards: 329
- Stats at Pro Football Reference

Bruce Raymond Gradkowski (born January 27, 1983) is an American former professional football quarterback and coach who currently serves as the assistant wide receivers coach for the Detroit Lions of the National Football League (NFL). He previously served as the offensive coordinator for the St. Louis BattleHawks of the United Football League (UFL). He played college football for the Toledo Rockets. He was selected by the Tampa Bay Buccaneers in the sixth round of the 2006 NFL draft. Gradkowski was also a member of the St. Louis Rams, Cleveland Browns, Oakland Raiders, Cincinnati Bengals, and Pittsburgh Steelers. His younger brother, Gino, is a former NFL center.

== Early life ==
Gradkowski is a 2001 graduate from Seton-La Salle Catholic High School. He played as a member of the Seton-La Salle Rebels from 1997 to 2000 in the Western Pennsylvania Interscholastic Athletic League (WPIAL). As a junior, Gradkowski threw for 1,630 yards and 10 touchdowns. This performance was then improved as a senior, when he completed 188-of-327 passes (57.5%) and threw for a then-WPIAL record of 2,978 yards and 30 touchdowns (surpassing the previous mark set by Dan Marino). In high school, Gradkowski also played basketball, serving as Seton-La Salle's starting point guard and leading his team in scoring.

== College career ==
After redshirting as a freshman at Toledo in 2001, Gradkowski only saw action as the field goal holder on the special teams unit. In 2003, he became the starting quarterback as a sophomore and set a Mid-American Conference season record by completing 71.2% of his passes. He threw for 3,210 yards and set a school season record of 29 touchdowns and seven interceptions. Gradkowski's final passer rating was 161.53. He proved he could scramble by rushing for 504 yards and one touchdown on 91 carries (5.5 avg). In 2004, Gradkowski completed 70.2% of his passes for 3,518 yards with 27 touchdowns and eight interceptions and a final passer rating of 162.56. He played in the GMAC Bowl and was named the game's Most Valuable Player (MVP). As a senior in 2005, Gradkowski completed 62.3% of his passes for 2,469 yards with 29 touchdowns and twelve interceptions and a final passer rating of 146.42. Gradkowski was the first quarterback in NCAA Division I-A history to complete more than 70 percent of his passes in consecutive seasons.

== Professional career ==
Pre-draft measurables
Height	Weight	Arm length	Hand span	40-yard dash	10-yard split	20-yard split	20-yard shuttle	Three-cone drill	Vertical jump	Broad jump	Wonderlic
6 ft 1 3/8 in (1.86 m)	217 lb (98 kg)	30 1/4 in (0.77 m)	9 in (0.23 m)	4.61 s	1.63 s	2.72 s	4.16 s	7.12 s	34 in (0.86 m)	8 ft 11 in (2.72 m)	19
All values from NFL Combine

=== Tampa Bay Buccaneers ===
The Tampa Bay Buccaneers selected Gradkowski in the sixth round (194th overall) of the 2006 NFL draft.

After a promising preseason he was nicknamed "The Great Gradkowski". When starting quarterback Chris Simms suffered a ruptured spleen, Gradkowski was named the starter going into Week 5 against New Orleans. In his debut, he completed 20 of 31 attempts for 225 yards with two touchdowns as the Buccaneers suffered their fourth consecutive loss.

Gradkowski remained the starter after his first loss and won the next two games against the Cincinnati Bengals and Philadelphia Eagles before losing three straight to the New York Giants, New Orleans Saints and Carolina Panthers. On November 19, 2006, he completed 14 of 21 attempts for 178 yards, two touchdowns, and one interception in a 20–17 victory over the Washington Redskins.

On Thanksgiving, the Buccaneers would lose to the Dallas Cowboys after Gradkowski threw two interceptions and only completed 10 passes. He continued to falter the following week throwing three interceptions in a loss to his hometown Pittsburgh Steelers. His play would continue to decline with losses against the Atlanta Falcons and Chicago Bears and he was benched in the middle of both games. Gradkowski was replaced in the second quarter against Chicago by Tim Rattay, who threw for four touchdowns in the second half of the game. Gradkowski, by contrast, had not thrown a touchdown in the previous 10 quarters before being pulled and would not start again in 2006. He finished his rookie season with 1,661 passing yards on 177 completions in 328 pass attempts, nine touchdowns, and nine interceptions.

In 2007 during a Week 12 matchup against the Washington Redskins, Gradkowski came in after the first play because of an injury to newly acquired starting quarterback Jeff Garcia but only completed 9 of 19 passes and didn't score. Gradkowski was benched the next week in favor of Luke McCown.

Gradkowski had a record of 3–8 as a Tampa Bay starter and set an NFL record by throwing 200 passes between his first and second interceptions.

On May 30, 2008, Gradkowski was waived by the Buccaneers.

=== St. Louis Rams ===
Gradkowski was claimed off waivers by the St. Louis Rams in June 2008, but was waived during final cuts on August 30, 2008.

=== Cleveland Browns ===
Gradkowski was signed by the Cleveland Browns as their fourth-string quarterback on December 2, 2008, after quarterback Derek Anderson was placed on injured reserve. He was the starter for the Browns' 2008 season finale against the Pittsburgh Steelers on December 28, 2008, after injuries to Anderson, Brady Quinn, and Ken Dorsey. Gradkowski was waived on February 9, 2009.

=== Oakland Raiders ===
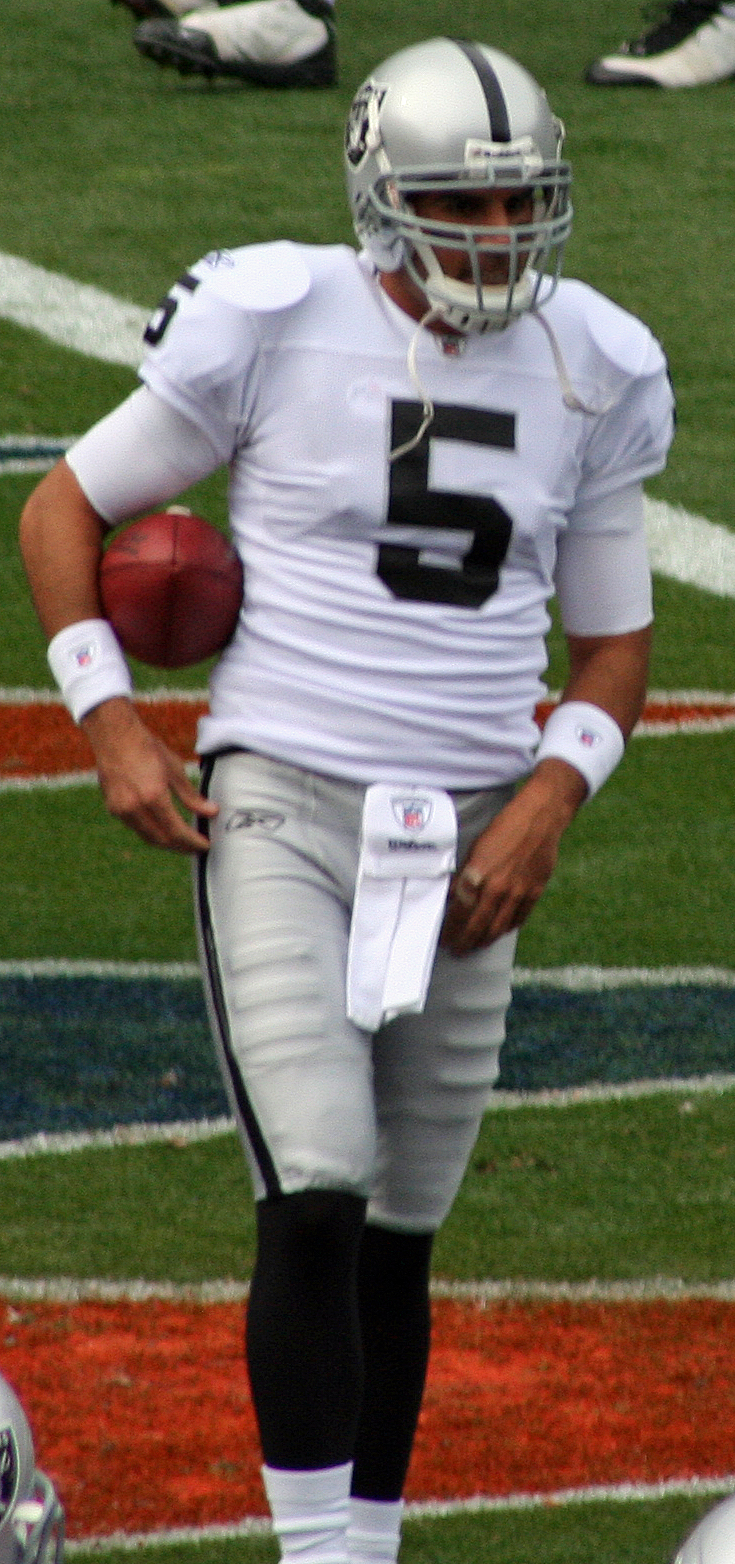
Gradkowski with the Oakland Raiders in 2010

A day after being waived by the Browns, Gradkowski was claimed off waivers by the Oakland Raiders.

On November 22, 2009, in his first start for the Raiders, Gradkowski threw two touchdowns, matching former Raiders quarterback JaMarcus Russell's total for the season to that point, and led the team to come from behind 20–17 victory over the heavily favored Cincinnati Bengals.

In Week 13, on the road the Raiders beat the Pittsburgh Steelers 27–24. Gradkowski completed 20-of-33 passes for 308 yards and three touchdowns, including an 11-yard game-winning touchdown to Louis Murphy. For his performance in this game he was awarded the AFC Offensive Player of the Week award for week 13 of the regular season.

On December 13, 2009, he was injured in a game against the Washington Redskins during the second quarter and was replaced by Russell. The Raiders lost the game 34–13 without Gradowski. Gradkowski missed the remainder of the 2009 season with a partially torn Medial collateral ligaments in both knees.

On March 15, 2010, he was re-signed by the Oakland Raiders for one year. He tore a pectoral muscle while lifting weights in April 2010. In Week 2 of the 2010 NFL season he took over for benched starter Jason Campbell and led the Raiders to a victory over the St. Louis Rams.

On September 22, 2010, Gradkowski became the Oakland Raiders starting quarterback for Week 3. On November 28, 2010, Gradkowski suffered a third-degree separation of his throwing shoulder. On December 2, the Raiders placed Gradkowski on injured reserve, ending his 2010 season.

=== Cincinnati Bengals ===
Following the 2011 NFL lockout, Gradkowski signed a two-year contract with the Cincinnati Bengals. He was the team's second-string quarterback behind Andy Dalton. After Dalton suffered a minor injury that removed him from the game, Gradkowski threw a touchdown while snapping the ball while the Browns were still in the huddle. He then appeared during a Week 13 match up against the Pittsburgh Steelers, completing 3-of-6 passes for 17 yards with one interception.

=== Pittsburgh Steelers ===
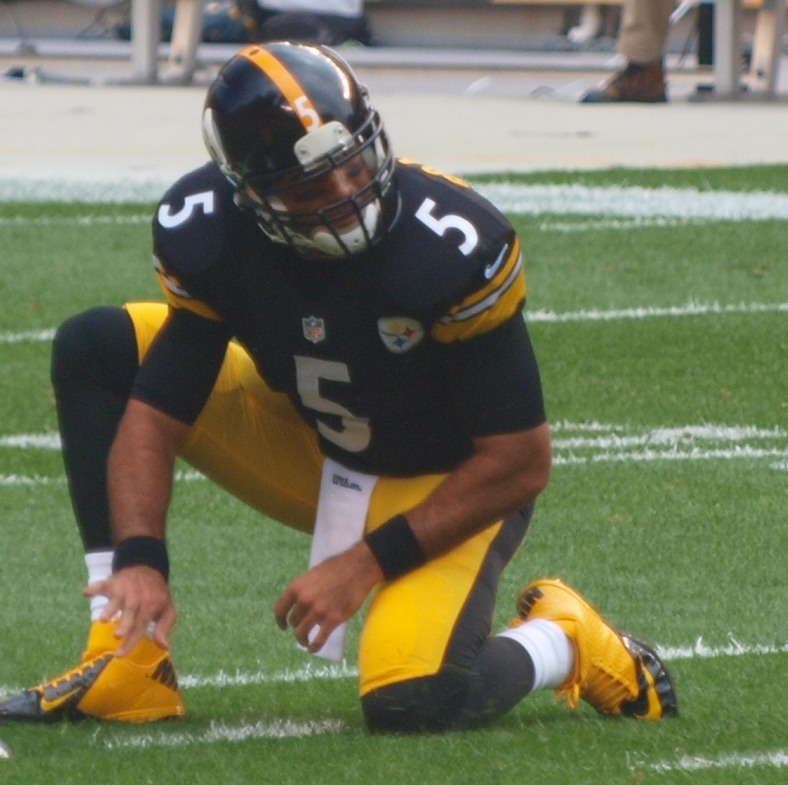
Gradkowski with the Pittsburgh Steelers in 2013

On March 13, 2013, Gradkowski signed a three-year deal with his hometown team, the Pittsburgh Steelers.

Ultimately, Gradkowski had very few career snaps with the Steelers. He played in none of the regular season games during 2013. In 2014, he played in one game. He missed almost the entire 2015 season due to hand and shoulder injuries.

The Steelers re-signed Gradkowski to a one-year contract on May 2, 2016. On August 31, 2016, Gradkowski was placed on the injured reserve list following damage to his hamstring sustained during the opening game of the preseason. The Steelers released Gradkowski on October 7, 2016.

== Career statistics ==
=== NFL ===
==== Regular season ====
Year	Team	Games			Passing								Rushing				Sacks		Fumbles (Note: Fumbles lost data taken from Pro Football Reference career game log)	
Year	Team	GP	GS	Record	Cmp	Att	Pct	Yds	Y/A	TD	Int	Rtg	Att	Yds	Avg	TD	Sck	SckY	Fum	Lost
2006	TB	13	11	3–8	177	328	54.0	1,661	5.1	9	9	65.9	41	161	3.9	0	25	146	11	6
2007	TB	4	0	–	13	24	54.2	130	5.4	0	1	52.4	7	20	2.9	0	2	14	0	0
2008	CLE	2	1	0–1	7	21	33.3	26	1.2	0	3	2.8	1	2	2.0	0	4	18	0	0
2009	OAK	7	4	2–2	82	150	54.7	1,007	6.7	6	3	80.6	18	108	6.0	0	11	71	5	3
2010	OAK	6	4	1–3	83	157	52.9	1,059	6.7	5	7	66.3	12	41	3.4	0	10	77	3	1
2011	CIN	2	0	–	8	18	44.4	109	6.1	1	1	59.7	11	29	2.6	0	1	7	0	0
2012	CIN	2	0	–	5	11	45.5	65	5.9	0	0	64.6	4	−2	−0.5	0	0	0	1	0
2013	PIT	0	0	DNP																
2014	PIT	1	0	–	0	0	0.0	0	0.0	0	0	0.0	2	−2	−1.0	0	0	0	0	0
2015	PIT	0	0	DNP																
2016	PIT	0	0	DNP																
Career		37	20	6–14	375	709	52.9	4,057	5.7	21	24	65.8	88	329	3.7	0	53	333	20	10

==== Playoffs ====
Year	Team	Games			Passing								Rushing				Sacks		Fumbles	
Year	Team	GP	GS	Record	Cmp	Att	Pct	Yds	Y/A	TD	Int	Rtg	Att	Yds	Avg	TD	Sck	SckY	Fum	Lost
2007	TB	0	0	DNP																
2011	CIN	0	0	DNP																
2012	CIN	0	0	DNP																
2014	PIT	1	0	–	2	3	66.7	22	7.3	0	0	0.0	0	0	0.0	0	0	0	0	0
2015	PIT	0	0	DNP																
Career		1	0	–	2	3	66.7	22	7.3	0	0	0.0	0	0	0.0	0	0	0	0	0

=== College ===
Year	Team	Passing									
Year	Team	Cmp	Att	Pct	Yds	Avg	Lng	TD	Int	Sck	Rtg
2003	Toledo	277	389	71.2	3,210	8.3	66	29	7	9	161.5
2004	Toledo	280	399	70.2	3,518	8.8	96	27	8	14	162.6
2005	Toledo	207	332	62.3	2,469	7.4	70	29	12	9	146.4
Career		764	1,120	68.2	9,197	8.2	96	85	27	34	156.8

== Awards and honors ==
NFL

- AFC Offensive Player of the Week (Week 13, 2009)
- Pro Football Weekly NFL Offensive Player of the Week (Week 13, 2009)

College

- 2× All-MAC (2001, 2004)
- MAC Co-Most Valuable Player (2005)
- GMAC Bowl MVP (2005)
- Toledo Hall of Fame (2012)

== Coaching career ==
In 2017, Gradkowski became a volunteer assistant quarterbacks coach at Anthony Wayne High School in Whitehouse, Ohio.

On June 15, 2021, it was reported he would be the head coach at St. Francis de Sales School (Toledo, Ohio). After serving as interim coach for one football season (2021) at St. Francis de Sales School, Bruce was to become the permanent head football coach at St. Francis de Sales for the 2022 season. However, Gradkowski was officially hired by the St. Louis BattleHawks on September 13, 2022, as their Offensive Coordinator.

On February 6, 2025, the Detroit Lions hired Gradkowski as an offensive assistant. On February 24, 2026, the Lions promoted Gradkowski to serve as the team's assistant wide receivers coach.

== Personal life ==
Gradkowski was the owner of Social Gastropub in Perrysburg, Ohio. The restaurant was officially closed due to fire in June 2022.

Gradkowski joined the University of Toledo's Rocket Football Radio Network as a color analyst.
