= Steve Sanders (American football) =

American football player (born 1982)

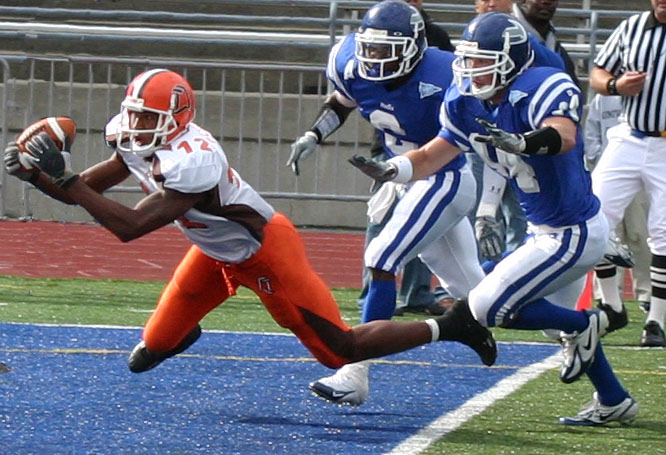
- Sanders making a diving catch while at Bowling Green

No. 83, 12
- Position: Wide receiver

Personal information
- Born: December 23, 1982 (age 43); Cleveland, Ohio, U.S.
- Listed height: 6 ft 3 in (1.91 m)
- Listed weight: 205 lb (93 kg)

Career information
- College: Bowling Green
- NFL draft: 2006: undrafted

Career history
- Cleveland Browns (2006–2008); Detroit Lions (2009)*; Hartford Colonials (2009)*; Arizona Cardinals (2009)*; New York Sentinels (2009); Cleveland Gladiators (2010)
- * Offseason or practice squad member only

Career NFL statistics
- Receptions: 1
- Receiving yards: 18
- Stats at Pro Football Reference

Steven Ike Sanders (born December 23, 1982) is an American former professional football player who was a wide receiver in the National Football League (NFL). He played college football for the Bowling Green Falcons and was signed by the Cleveland Browns as an undrafted free agent in 2006.

Sanders also was a member of the Detroit Lions, New York Sentinels and Arizona Cardinals.

== Early life ==
Sanders attended East High School in Cleveland, Ohio playing football player for the historic East High School Blue Bombers. On February 2, 2003 his first child Armier Sanders was born.

== College career ==
Sanders played college football for the Bowling Green Falcons. He finished his college career with 156 receptions for 2,324 yards and 24 touchdowns. He has a Liberal Studies bachelor's degree.

== Professional career ==
=== Cleveland Browns ===
Sanders was signed by the Cleveland Browns as an undrafted rookie free agent on May 4, 2006.

Sanders was added to the active roster September 6, 2008 after the team waived rookie wide receiver Paul Hubbard. Sanders was waived on October 6 when the team signed safety Hamza Abdullah. He was re-signed to the team's practice squad on October 8. He was promoted to the Browns' active roster on November 1 after offensive lineman Ryan Tucker was placed on injured reserve.

=== Detroit Lions ===
After finishing the 2008 season on the Browns' practice squad, Sanders was signed to a future contract by the Detroit Lions on January 7, 2009. He was waived on May 4.

=== New York Sentinels ===
Sanders was selected by the New York Sentinels of the United Football League in the UFL Premiere Season Draft. He signed with the team on August 5, 2009, but was later released from his contract so he could sign with the Arizona Cardinals.

=== Arizona Cardinals ===
Sanders signed with the Arizona Cardinals on August 18, 2009 only to be waived on September 4.

=== Arena Football League ===
In March 2010, Sanders was signed by his hometown Cleveland Gladiators of the Arena Football League.
