= Rubber Bowl =

Former stadium in Akron, Ohio

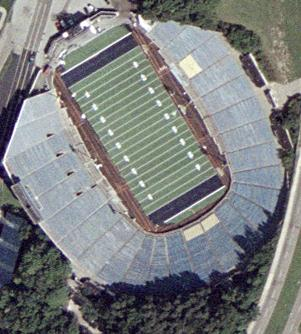
- Aerial view in 2004
- Interactive map of Rubber Bowl
- Location: 800 George Washington Blvd., Akron, Ohio 44312
- Coordinates: 41°2′22″N 81°27′22″W
- Owner: County of Summit, Ohio
- Operator: County of Summit, Ohio
- Capacity: 35,202
- Surface: Grass (1940–1976); Astroturf (1977–2002); AstroPlay (2003–2008)

Construction
- Groundbreaking: 1939
- Opened: 1940
- Closed: 2008
- Demolished: 2018, 2023
- Cost: $546,000 ($12.5 million in 2025 dollars)
- Architect: Osborn Engineering Company

Tenant
- Akron Zips (NCAA) 1940–2008

The Rubber Bowl was a stadium located in Akron, Ohio, that was primarily used for American football. From its opening in 1940 until 2008, it served as the home field of the Akron Zips football team of the University of Akron prior to the opening of InfoCision Stadium–Summa Field. Throughout its history, it also hosted concerts, professional football, high school football, and other events. It was named after the predominance of the tire industry in Akron. The stadium had a seating capacity of 35,202 and was located in southeastern Akron next to Akron Fulton International Airport and Derby Downs, about 6 miles (9.7 km) southeast of downtown.

Since 2008, the stadium had been mostly vacant, hosting some high school football games. In 2013, the Rubber Bowl was acquired by Team1 Marketing Group Inc. of Canton, Ohio, with plans to renovate and update the structure as the home for a professional football team. Renovation work began later in 2013, but initial plans for a professional team in the revived United States Football League (USFL) fell through.

The stadium was condemned in 2017, and partial demolition began on June 20, 2018. By 2020, the south and east tiers, built into the hillside, remained, along with their respective ticket booths, though all wound up in a dilapidated state from damage caused by vandals and weathering. Most of the artificial turf field, last used in 2008, also remained in place during that time, though it had also been heavily damaged by vandals and the elements. As part of a statewide initiative, the remaining parts of the Rubber Bowl were demolished in mid-2023 after almost 15 years of abandonment.

== History ==
The movement to build a stadium in Akron began in 1939 when Akron Beacon Journal sports editor James Schlemmer and Akron Municipal Airport director Bain Fulton began a campaign asking patrons to donate $1 each. Later that year, the Works Progress Administration authorized construction of a horseshoe-shaped stadium in southern Akron adjacent to Derby Downs, the home of the Soap Box Derby that had been built in 1936. Construction lasted approximately one year and the first event hosted was a state music and drill competition in June 1940. Dedication ceremonies were held in August 1940 before a crowd estimated between 36,000 and 40,000 the day before the running of the seventh Soap Box Derby.

=== Akron Zips football ===
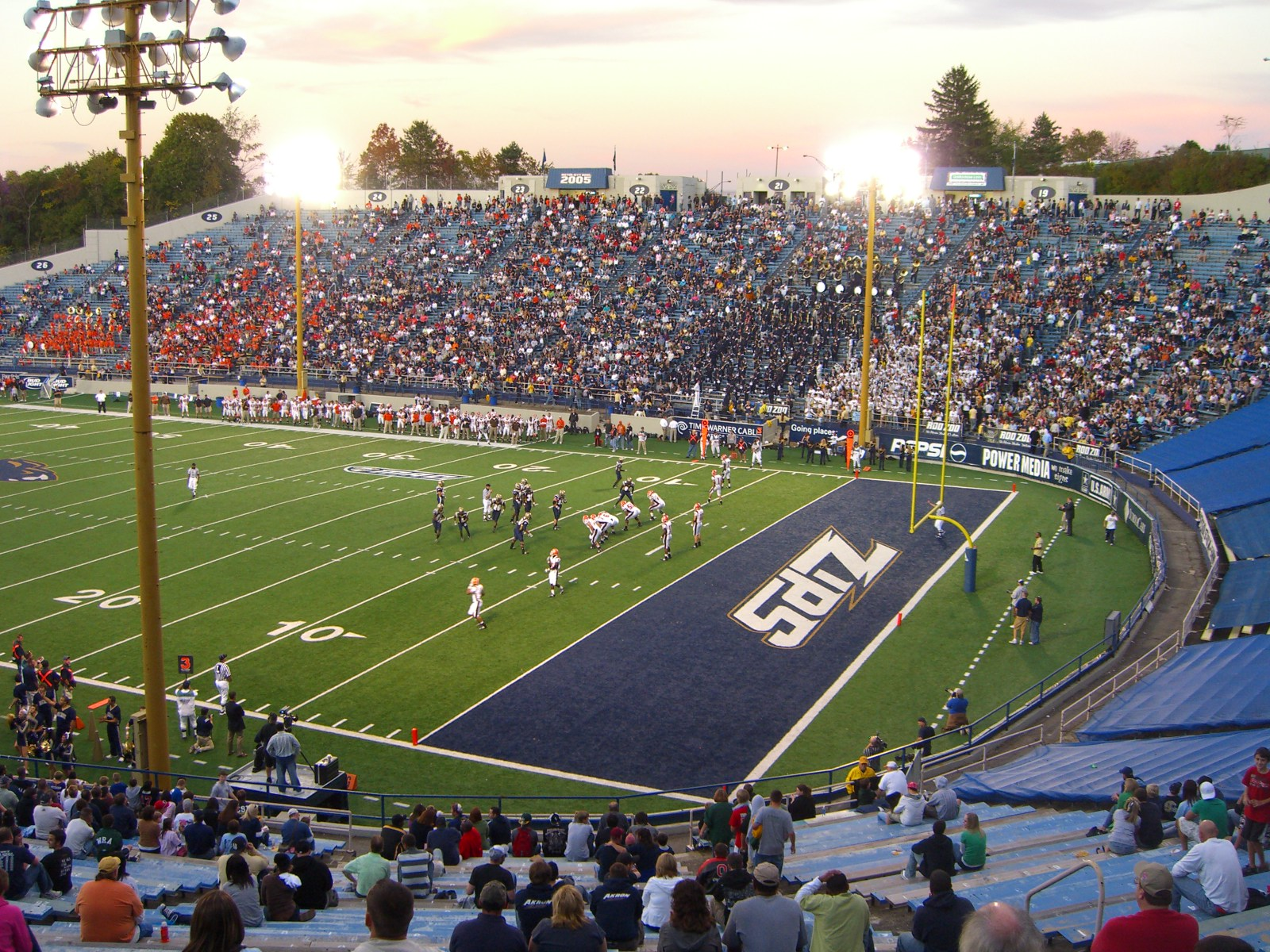
The Akron Zips and Bowling Green Falcons compete at the Rubber Bowl on October 11, 2008.

The primary use of the Rubber Bowl was for American football games. The Akron Zips football team was the primary tenant, and they played their first game in the stadium on October 5, 1940, against Western Reserve University, getting their first win in the facility November 9, 1940, against Kent State. Prior to playing at the Rubber Bowl, the Zips football teams played at Buchtel Field, a 7,000-seat facility that opened in 1923. The Zips recorded their first sellout in the Rubber Bowl on September 30, 1961. In 1971, the university purchased the stadium for $1 from the city. An artificial surface was installed in 1973, which was replaced with AstroPlay in 2003. On September 15, 1973, before the Acme-Zip game, renown tightrope walker Karl Wallenda walked a wire suspended above the field while the Akron Zips marching band played circus music. The Zips played 324 games at the stadium, which included their first-ever appearance on ESPN in 1986. Other notable games include the highest-scoring game in the stadium's history, a 65–62 victory over Eastern Michigan in 2001, as well as a 65–7 Akron victory over Howard University in 2003. In 2005, the Zips clinched their first Mid-American Conference East Division title and spot in the 2005 MAC Championship Game with a 35–3 win over arch-rival Kent State in that year's Wagon Wheel game. Akron would go on to win the 2005 MAC Championship with a last-second 31–30 win over Northern Illinois at Ford Field in Detroit.

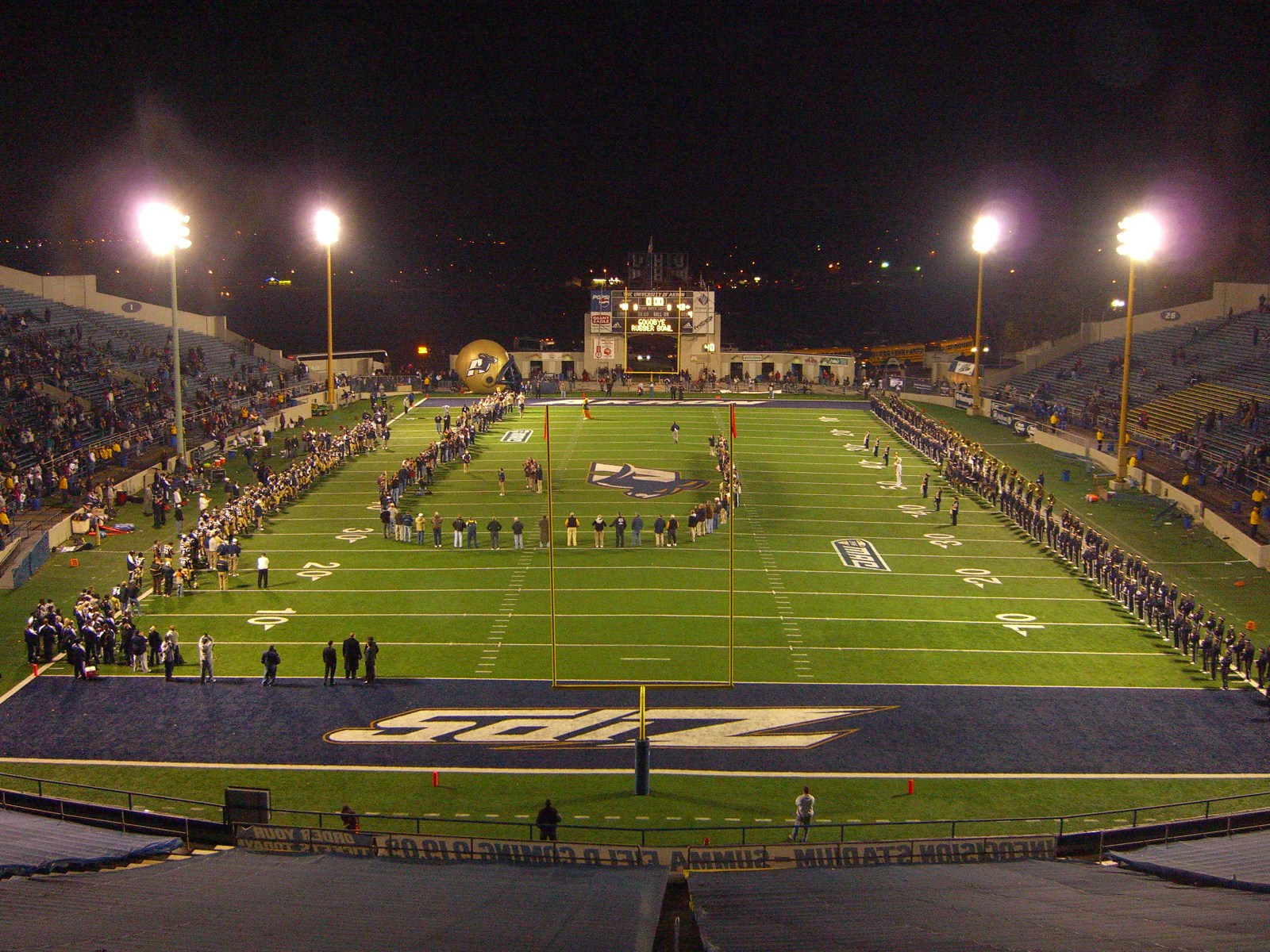
An on-field ceremony at the Rubber Bowl after 324th and final Akron Zips football game on November 13, 2008.

In 2003, the university began exploring the feasibility of building an on-campus stadium to replace the Rubber Bowl, which was in disrepair and several miles away from campus. In 2007, plans were announced for a new stadium, later known as InfoCision Stadium – Summa Field, with work beginning in January 2008 and opening in September 2009. The final Akron Zips football game at the Rubber Bowl took place on November 13, 2008 against the Buffalo Bulls. The game was nationally televised on ESPN and featured the two teams tied for first place in the Mid-American Conference's East Division with identical 5-4 (3-2) records entering the game. Buffalo defeated the Zips 43-40 in four overtimes in front of a crowd of 18,516. For the Zips, it was both the first four-overtime game and the first overtime loss in school history. After the game, a special ceremony with current and former players and coaches was held to honor the 68-year history of the stadium.

=== Other uses ===
The Kent State Golden Flashes football team played select games in the Rubber Bowl during the 1940s, prior to the opening of Memorial Stadium in 1950.

The stadium also hosted professional football on a number of occasions: the Cleveland Rams of the National Football League (NFL) played two regular-season games at the Rubber Bowl, one in 1941 and one in 1942, and the NFL's Cleveland Browns used the stadium for 19 preseason games between 1950 and 1973.

On November 27, 1952, the Rubber Bowl hosted a "home" game for the financially troubled and league-controlled Dallas Texans. The Texans recorded their only win in franchise history, a 27–23 victory over the George Halas-led Chicago Bears, in front of approximately 2,500 fans: Halas had been so confident the Bears would beat the lowly Texans that he started his second-string players.

The Rubber Bowl has also hosted around 1,500 football games for the high schools in Akron, as well as for Ohio High School Athletic Association (OHSAA) playoff games.

The Rubber Bowl was also a regular performance venue: the Ringling Brothers and Barnum & Bailey Circus gave its first performance since the Hartford circus fire on July 6, 1944. Music groups such as Black Sabbath, Simon & Garfunkel, Alice Cooper, Three Dog Night, and The Rolling Stones played there in the 1970s. In the 1980s, the New Jersey tour of Bon Jovi and the Monsters of Rock Tour 1988 that featured Van Halen, the Scorpions, Dokken, Metallica, and Kingdom Come had stops at the Rubber Bowl. Simon & Garfunkel returned in 1983 in front of a crowd of around 37,000 during their first tour together in 13 years. Tom Petty and the Heartbreakers, Bob Dylan, and The Grateful Dead toured together in 1986 and played at the Rubber Bowl, which featured Bob Dylan performing live on stage for the first time with The Grateful Dead. The stadium also hosted a Veterans Memorial Jam concert with Aretha Franklin, Ringo Starr, and Three Dog Night in 1997 and Ozzfest in 1998.

=== Purchase and demolition ===
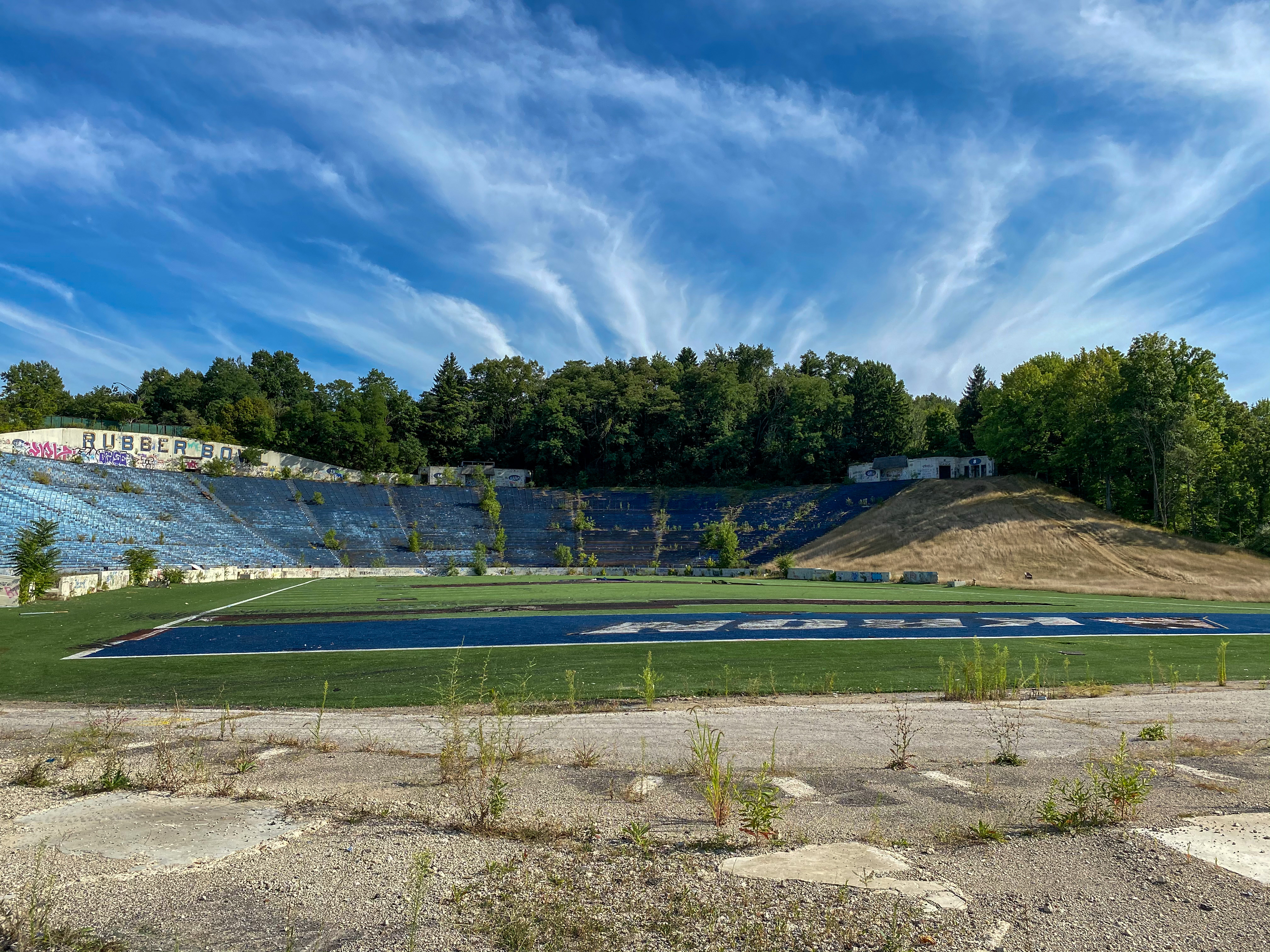
View of the stadium in August 2020 as seen from the north end zone. The area on the right is where the west stands and press box stood prior to demolition in 2018.

On June 28, 2012, it was revealed that local marketing company Team1 Marketing Group of Canton was pursuing the Rubber Bowl for a potential United States Football League (USFL) team called the Akron Fire. Sean Mason of Team1 argued that even though InfoCision Stadium is newer, the Akron Fire's ability to generate revenue would be less due to the University of Akron controlling concession and marketing rights, and by buying the Rubber Bowl outright it could also be used for other sporting events and concerts. The Rubber Bowl was purchased by Team1 Marketing in January 2013 for $38,000, with several improvements planned such as updates to the press box, locker rooms, and concession areas, along with new scoreboards and seating. The company announced plans to acquire a USFL franchise; the team was planned to be named the Akron Fire, but in July 2013 it was announced that the league's plans no longer included the Akron team. Team1 announced on April 17, 2014 that the stadium would instead be used as a multi-use entertainment facility and that it would have a dome built over it. On April 2, 2015 it was revealed that the non-profit Minor League Football Team named the Summit County Storm would be playing football in the revived stadium along with its multi-use entertainment. The first event in the stadium under Team1 was scheduled for May 15, 2015, a hip-hop concert and party fest known as LOUD-Fest, produced by a local music company. However, the event was rescheduled to another location "due to concerns about the dilapidated stadium". On April 5, 2017 the County of Summit foreclosed on the stadium with plans to allow Team1 to lease the stadium and repurpose it for mixed use entertainment. Team1 gave up the deed on August 29, 2017 allowing the city of Akron to become full-time owners after Team1 announced that they failed to attract attention to the structure. Akron announced on September 22, 2017 that the stadium would be demolished. Demolition began in 2018 with the scoreboard and the western portion of the stadium closest to Derby Downs, which included the press box, being razed, while the east and south tiers, which are built into the adjacent hill, remaining. The portion built into the hillside supported George Washington Boulevard, and removal could potentially cause the roadway to collapse. In 2023, the remainder of the stadium was demolished with the hillside portion of the stadium reinforced with concrete to form a retaining wall for the roadway above and transform the structure into a grassy hill.
