= 2025 Ohio Bobcats football team =

American college football season

2025 Ohio Bobcats football

Frisco Bowl champion

Frisco Bowl, W 17–10 vs. UNLV
- Conference: Mid-American Conference
- Record: 9–4 (6–2 MAC)
- Head coach: Brian Smith (1st season; regular season); John Hauser (interim; bowl game)
- Offensive coordinator: Scott Isphording (4th season)
- Offensive scheme: Spread option
- Defensive coordinator: John Hauser (2nd season)
- Base defense: 4–2–5
- Captains: Parker Navarro; DJ Walker; Davion Weatherspoon; Adonis Williams Jr.
- Home stadium: Peden Stadium

2025 Mid-American Conference football standings
	Conf.			Overall
Team	W		L	W		L
Western Michigan y$	7	–	1	10	–	4
Miami (OH) y	6	–	2	7	–	7
Ohio	6	–	2	9	–	4
Toledo	6	–	2	8	–	5
Central Michigan	5	–	3	7	–	6
Akron*	4	–	4	5	–	7
Buffalo	4	–	4	5	–	7
Kent State	4	–	4	5	–	7
Eastern Michigan	3	–	5	4	–	8
Ball State	3	–	5	4	–	8
Bowling Green	2	–	6	4	–	8
Northern Illinois	2	–	6	3	–	9
UMass	0	–	8	0	–	12
Championship: Western Michigan 23, Miami (OH) 13
$ – Conference champion; y – Championship game participant; * Ineligible for postseason play due to low APR score

The 2025 Ohio Bobcats football team represented Ohio University in the Mid-American Conference (MAC) during the 2025 NCAA Division I FBS football season. The Bobcats were led by Brian Smith in his first year as the head coach. The Bobcats play home games at Peden Stadium, located in Athens, Ohio.

Ohio entered the season coming off of 2024 season with a school record 11 wins and three straight seasons with at least 10 wins. The Bobcats are the defending MAC Champion after Ohio avenged its only MAC regular season loss with a 38–3 win over rival Miami in the 2024 MAC Championship Game. They won the MAC Championship for the first time since 1968. Ohio entered the season on an FBS leading seven game winning streak and a six game winning streak in bowl games after defeating Conference USA Champion Jacksonville State in the Cure Bowl. Brian Smith entered his first full year as head coach after earning his first win in the bowl, having replaced Tim Albin after Albin took the head coach position at Charlotte.

Ohio entered the season ranked 94th out of 135 FBS teams and fourth in the MAC in returning production as determined by the SP+ rankings. Among the returners is starting quarterback Parker Navarro who entered the year with a 12–2 record as a starting quarterback. After a somewhat sluggish start, Navarro caught fire during the 2024 season ending seven game winning streak. Navarro won MAC Offensive Player of the week four times in the regular season and again in the MAC Championship and was MVP of the bowl win.

On December 1, 2025, the university announced that head coach Brian Smith was on indefinite leave. No further details were provided. Defensive coordinator John Hauser was named the interim head coach. On December 16, the University terminated Smith for cause. The only information provided stated that he "violated the terms of his employment agreement by engaging in serious professional misconduct and participating in activities that reflect unfavorably on the University" and that the search for a new coach would begin immediately. Hauser was named full-time head coach three days after the bowl win on December 26.

== Schedule ==
Date	Time	Opponent	Site	TV	Result	Attendance	Source
August 28	6:00 p.m.	at Rutgers*	SHI Stadium; Piscataway, NJ	BTN	L 31–34	46,907	
September 6	4:00 p.m.	West Virginia*	Peden Stadium; Athens, OH	ESPNU	W 17–10	26,740	
September 13	7:00 p.m.	at No. 1 Ohio State*	Ohio Stadium; Columbus, OH	Peacock	L 9–37	105,765	
September 20	3:30 p.m.	Gardner–Webb*	Peden Stadium; Athens, OH	ESPN+	W 52–35	22,312	
September 27	12:00 p.m.	Bowling Green	Peden Stadium; Athens, OH	CBSSN	W 35–20	20,027	
October 4	12:00 p.m.	at Ball State	Scheumann Stadium; Muncie, IN	CBSSN	L 14–20	8,427	
October 18	3:30 p.m.	Northern Illinois^{†}	Peden Stadium; Athens, OH	ESPN+	W 48–21	22,293	
October 25	12:00 p.m.	at Eastern Michigan	Rynearson Stadium; Ypsilanti, MI	CBSSN	W 28–21	15,985	
November 4	7:00 p.m.	Miami (OH)	Peden Stadium; Athens, OH (Battle of the Bricks)	ESPN2	W 24–20	22,231	
November 11	8:00 p.m.	at Western Michigan	Waldo Stadium; Kalamazoo, MI	ESPN2	L 13–17	10,849	
November 18	7:00 p.m.	UMass	Peden Stadium; Athens, OH	CBSSN	W 42–14	12,438	
November 28	12:00 p.m.	at Buffalo	University at Buffalo Stadium; Amherst, NY	ESPNU	W 31–26	11,096	
December 23	9:00 p.m.	vs. UNLV*	Ford Center at The Star; Frisco, TX (Frisco Bowl)	ESPN	W 17–10	6,521	
*Non-conference game; ^{†}Homecoming; Rankings from AP Poll (and CFP Rankings, from the date when issued) – Released prior to game; All times are in Eastern time; Source:

== Preseason ==
The MAC Football Kickoff was held on Thursday, July 24, 2025 at the Ford Field in Detroit, Michigan from 9:00 am EDT to 1:30 pm EDT. Ohio was represented by Head Coach Brian Smith, quarterback Parker Navarro, and safety DJ Walker.

=== MAC coaches preseason poll ===
On July 24 the MAC announced the coaches preseason poll. Ohio was picked to finish third in the conference. They received three votes to win the MAC Championship.

=== Preseason award watch lists ===
Award	Player	Position	Year	Ref
Maxwell Award	Parker Navarro	QB	Gr.	
Jim Thorpe Award	Tank Pearson	CB	Gr.	
Jim Thorpe Award	DJ Walker	S	RS-So.	
Walter Camp Award	Parker Navarro	QB	Gr.	
Davey O'Brien Award	Parker Navarro	QB	Gr.	
John Mackey Award	Mason Williams	TE	RS-So.	
Bednarik Award	DJ Walker	S	RS-So.	
Manning Award	Parker Navarro	QB	Gr.	

== Season summary ==
Ohio opened the season at Big Ten opponent Rutgers. After falling being by 17 following a blocked punt late in the second quarter, Ohio tied the game in the second half but could not get the win as the Scarlet Knights won 34–31 with a 4th quarter field goal. Navarro did well in the loss with 239 yards passing and 93 yards rushing. Ohio hosted Big 12 Conference opponent West Virginia in week 2 in front of a record crowd at Peden Stadium. Ohio overcame an early deficit to take the lead and held on through three Navarro 2nd half interceptions, with the defense forcing a three and out on each ensuing WVU drive, to defeat the Mountaineers by a score of 17–10. The following week, Ohio travelled to Ohio State to take on the No. 1 team for the first time in program history. Navarro missed most of the first half with a hand injury but came back to hit Chase Hendricks on a second half touchdown to pull the Bobcats within 13–9 before the Buckeye offense got going and Ohio State pulled away for a 37–9 win. The Bobcats ended non-conference play by hosting FCS Gardner-Webb. Gardner-Webb took an early lead but Ohio's offense took control of the game in a 52–35 win to get back to .500 on the season.

Ohio opened MAC play against Bowling Green in week 5. Ohio's defense forced four turnovers, including a first quarter pick-six by linebacker Cam Hollobaugh, in a 35–20 victory. In their first MAC away game the Bobcats jumped out to a 14–0 halftime lead but their offense sputtered in the second half and Ball State rallied for a 20–14 upset win. Ohio's offense recovered after a bye week in a 48–21 win over Northern Illinois as both Sieh Bangura and Duncan Brune each rushed for over 100 yards. The Bobcats fell behind early in their final Saturday game at Eastern Michigan, but their offense got moving in the second half and then withstood EMU's comeback attempt in a 28–21 victory. Navarro threw for a career high 315 yards in the win.

In the first midweek MACtion game of November, Ohio hosted Miami, who entered the game in sole possession of first place in the MAC, in the Battle of the Bricks rivalry. Running back Sieh Bangura returned a kickoff for a touchdown and rushed for 102 yards and a touchdown while Jalen Thomeson sealed the game his first career interception as the Bobcats gained a share of first place in a 24–20 win. The Bobcats lost control of their own destiny in the MAC in a battle between teams tied for first place the next week at Western Michigan. The Broncos kept Ohio's offense in check most of the game and held Navarro to 70 yards passing in a 17–13 loss. The Bobcats played conservatively and racked up 380 yards on the ground and six rushing touchdowns, with only 8 attempted passes, on a cold and wet weeknight against a winless Massachusetts team. The 42–14 win extended the home winning streak to 13 and marked the 3rd unbeaten at home slate in four seasons, and also kept hope alive to repeat as MAC champions going into the regular season game against Buffalo. On a windy day in Buffalo, New York, the Bobcats again relied heavily on their rushing attack, racking up 359 rushing yards and 506 yards of offense, to overcome three first half turnovers and defeat the Buffalo Bulls by a score of 31–26. The following day, a Miami victory over Ball State moved the RedHawks into a three-way tie for second place with Ohio and Toledo at 6–2 in the conference. Miami won the tiebreaker to advance to the championship game in spite of losing to both teams during the regular season. They played Western Michigan who, with a 7–1 conference record, finished the regular season in sole possession of first place in the MAC standings.

On December 7, it was announced that the Bobcats would be playing in the Frisco Bowl against UNLV. The Rebels were the Mountain West Conference runner up, having finished the season 6–2 in conference and 10–3 overall after losing the championship game to Boise State Ohio defeated UNLV 17–10 for their seventh consecutive bowl victory and John Hauser's first ever win as a head coach. They were led by running back Sieh Bangura, who was named Offensive Player of the Game with 149 rushing yards. Ohio's defense held the high-powered UNLV offense to only 281 total yards. It set a school record for wins over four-year span with forty.

== Game summaries ==
=== at Rutgers ===
Ohio Bobcats (0–0) at Rutgers Scarlet Knights (0–0) – Game summary

Quarter	1	2	3	4	Total
Bobcats	7	10	14	0	31
Scarlet Knights	7	24	0	3	34

at SHI Stadium • Piscataway, NJ

- Date: August 28
- Game time: 6:00 p.m. EDT
- Game weather: sunny, Temperature:77 °F (25 °C), Wind: SW 7 mph (11 km/h)
- Game attendance: 46,907
- Referee: Mark Kluczynski (B10)
- TV announcers (BTN): Jason Horowitz (play-by-play), Brock Vereen (analyst), and Caroline Hendershot (sideline reporter)
- Ohio notes, Rutgers notes • boxscore

Game information

First quarter

- (09:52) RUTG – Antwan Raymond 14-yard run (Jai Patel kick), 10 plays, 65 yards, 4:54; RUTG 7–0
- (04:58) OHIO – Mason Williams 4-yard pass from Parker Navarro (David Dellenbach kick), 8 plays, 58 yards, 5:08; Tied 7–7

Second quarter

- (14:52) RUTG – Jai Patel 23-yard field goal, 10 plays, 52 yards, 5:01; RUTG 10–7
- (13:52) RUTG – DT Sheffield 54-yard pass from Athan Kaliakmanis (Jai Patel kick), 1 play, 54 yards, 0:07; RUTG 17–7
- (08:34) OHIO – Jake Bruno 14-yard pass from Parker Navarro (David Dellenbach kick), 10 plays, 75 yards, 5:18; RUTG 17–14
- (05:20) RUTG – KJ Duff 6-yard pass from Athan Kaliakmanis (Jai Patel kick), 6 plays, 75 yards, 3:14; RUTG 24–14
- (03:22) RUTG – Cam Miller 0-yard punt return (Jai Patel kick); RUTG 31–14
- (00:08) OHIO – David Dellenbach 30-yard field goal, 13 plays, 82 yards, 3:14; RUTG 31–17

Third quarter

- (11:10) OHIO – Parker Navarro 17-yard run (David Dellenbach kick), 9 plays, 75 yards, 3:50; RUTG 31–24
- (04:07) OHIO – Jake Bruno 13-yard pass from Parker Navarro (David Dellenbach kick), 7 plays, 90 yards, 3:38; Tied 31–31

Fourth quarter

- (11:11) RUTG – Jai Patel 26-yard field goal, 14 plays, 67 yards, 7:56; RUTG 34–31

Statistics	OHIO	RUTG
First downs	24	24
Plays–yards	62-440	59-399
Rushes–yards	31-201	36-147
Passing yards	239	252
Passing: comp–att–int	21-31-0	18-23-0
Turnovers	0	0
Time of possession	28:15	31:45

Team	Category	Player	Statistics
Ohio	Passing	Parker Navarro	21/31, 239 yards, 3 TD
Ohio	Rushing	Parker Navarro	9 carries, 93 yards, TD
Ohio	Receiving	Chase Hendricks	9 receptions, 115 yards
Rutgers	Passing	Athan Kaliakmanis	18/23, 252 yards, 2 TD
Rutgers	Rushing	Antwan Raymond	14 carries, 88 yards, TD
Rutgers	Receiving	Ian Strong	7 receptions, 100 yards

Ohio opened the season on a Week 1 Thursday game at Rutgers in SHI Stadium. Rutgers was led by 17th year head coach Greg Schiano who is 12–4 in season openers at Rutgers. Ohio entered 1–2 all-time against the Scarlet Knights. The two teams had last met in 2011 when Rutgers scored a 38–26 win.

Rutgers defeated Ohio 34–31. The Scarlet Knights took advantage of several key moments, including a blocked punt returned for a touchdown, and a perfect 5-for-5 on fourth-down conversions, including a game sealing 10-yard completion, to snap Ohio's seven game winning streak. The Scarlet Knights set the tone early with a 12-play, 75-yard scoring drive to open the game. After converting a 4th and 3 earlier, running back Antoine Raymond capped the methodical drive with a 14-yard touchdown run on a 4th a 2, putting Rutgers on the board first. Ohio responded with a 10 play drive ending in a Mason Williams touchdown reception from Parker Navarro. Rutgers responded with another long drive but were held to a short Jai Patel field goal. After holding Ohio to a punt, Rutgers capitalized with a quick 54-yard touchdown pass from Athan Kaliakmanis to DT Sheffield who got behind the Ohio defense on the first play of the drive. Ohio responded with a 14-yard touchdown pass to tight end Jake Bruno and the ensuing drive to make the score 17–14. Rutgers went up by 10 points again after Kaliakmanis connected with KJ Duff for a 6-yard touchdown pass. The Bobcats were forced to punt when a low snap led to a blocked kick by Kaj Sanders. The ball was recovered in the end zone by Cam Miller for a Rutgers touchdown, giving the Scarlet Knights a commanding 31–14 lead. Ohio stayed in the game with a David Dellenbach field goal just before the half to get within two scores.

Parker Navarro engineered back-to-back scoring drives on Ohio's first two-second half drives. First, he ran for a 17-yard touchdown, and on the next possession after forcing Rutgers' only punt, he threw a 13-yard touchdown pass to Jake Bruno to tie the game at 31–31. Rutgers went 77-yards and used 7:56 of game clock and retook the lead with another short Patel field goal with 11:14 remaining. The Bobcats were forced to punt. Rutgers was able to seal the game, holding the ball for 12-plays, with a 4th and 7 converted with a 10-yard pass from Kaliakmanis to Sheffield that allowed them to run out the clock.

Rutgers quarterback Athan Kaliakmanis led the offense, throwing for 252 yards and two touchdowns. Antwan Raymond had 88 yards rushing and a touchdown while Ian Strong had 100 yards receiving. Ohio's offense was propelled by the dual-threat abilities of Parker Navarro, who threw for 239 yards and three touchdowns while also rushing for 93 yards and a score. Despite the loss, Navarro was named MAC Offensive Player of the Week. This marked the fourth regular season week in a row for Navarro as well as being Offensive MVP of the MAC Championship and MVP of the bowl win. Ohio had 440 yards of offense, 41 more than Rutgers, in the loss. Chase Hendricks had 9 receptions for 115 yards to lead Ohio's receivers. Adonis Williams led Ohio with 11 tackles.

=== vs. West Virginia ===
West Virginia Mountaineers (1–0) at Ohio Bobcats (0–1) – Game summary

Quarter	1	2	3	4	Total
Mountaineers	7	0	3	0	10
Bobcats	3	14	0	0	17

at Peden Stadium • Athens, OH

- Date: September 6
- Game time: 4:00 p.m. EDT
- Game weather: cloudy, Temperature:65 °F (18 °C), Wind: W 1 mph (1.6 km/h)
- Game attendance: 26,740
- Referee: Michael VanderVelde (B12)
- TV announcers (ESPNU): Courtney Lyle (play-by-play) and Rene Ingoglia (analyst)
- Ohio notes, West Virginia notes • boxscore

Game information

First quarter

- (03:22) WVU – Jahiem White 32-yard run (Kade Hensley kick), 6 plays, 89 yards, 2:11; WVU 7–0
- (1:07) OHIO – Brack Peacock 37-yard field goal, 6 plays, 60 yards, 2:10; WVU 7–3

Second quarter

- (1:19) OHIO – Sieh Bangura 1-yard run (Brack Peacock kick), 12 plays, 71 yards, 6:00; OHIO 10–7
- (04:58) OHIO – Chase Hendricks 31-yard pass from Parker Navarro (Brack Peacock kick), 3 plays, 74 yards, 0:25; OHIO 17–7

Third quarter

- (12:31) OHIO – Kade Hensley 38-yard field goal, 7 plays, 51 yards, 2:24; OHIO 17–10

Fourth quarter

- No scoring plays

Statistics	WVU	OHIO
First downs	13	24
Total yards	56–250	79–429
Rushing yards	28–72	48–182
Passing yards	178	247
Passing: Comp–Att–Int	15–26–1	22–31–3
Turnovers	1	3
Time of possession	19:45	40:15

Team	Category	Player	Statistics
West Virginia	Passing	Nicco Marchiol	15/26, 178 yards, INT
West Virginia	Rushing	Jahiem White	6 carries, 40 yards, TD
West Virginia	Receiving	Jaden Bray	4 receptions, 69 yards
Ohio	Passing	Parker Navarro	22/31, 237 yards, TD, 3 INT
Ohio	Rushing	Parker Navarro	18 carries, 87 yards
Ohio	Receiving	Chase Hendricks	9 receptions, 121 yards, TD

West Virginia came to Athens to open Ohio's home schedule. WVU defeated FCS 2025 Robert Morris 45–3 in week 1. The Mountaineers were led by Rich Rodriguez who returned to Morgantown this year for his second stint at West Virginia after posting a 60–26 record from 2001 to 2007. He led Jacksonville State to the 2024 Conference USA championship. He had accepted the West Virginia position before Ohio defeated the Gamecocks in the 2024 Cure Bowl. Ohio is 5–12 all-time against the Mountaineers with the first matchup occurring in 1897. West Virginia won the last matchup in 2001 by a score of 45–3.

It was announced that Peden Stadium was sold out on August 12. The game attendance of 26,740 was a Peden Stadium record.

Ohio took the opening kickoff and was immediately held to a quick three and out. WVU's offense didn't fare any better on their first drive. The Bobcats reached midfield on their second drive after starting deep in their own end after fielding a punt just in front of the goal line but were forced to punt after 10 plays. West Virginia, starting at their own 10, got some offense going on the ensuing drive. The final two plays were the key. Cam Vaughn's 31-yard reception set WVU up on the Ohio 32. From there Jahiem White finished the drive with a rushing touchdown on the next play. On the next drive a 38-yard reception by Chase Hendricks set Ohio up at the WVU 23-yard line but Ohio could not get much deeper and settled for a Brack Peacock field goal. After a Mountaineer 3 and out, the Bobcats reached the WVU 8 after a Parker Navarro 13-yard scramble but were unable to capitalize. After a sack, fumble, and penalty, Ohio was pushed back to the 33. A 12-yard reception by Hendricks put OU back in field goal range but the Peacock failed on the attempt. Ohio's defense held West Virginia to another 3 and out. Ohio took their first lead by marching 81 yards in 12 plays with the key play being a 22-yard reception by Max Rodarte. Sieh Bangura finished the drive with a 1-yard rush with 2:36 remaining in the half.

On the first play of the ensuing WVU drive, White suffered a season ending injury after Jalen Thomeson was called for two different personal fouls on the tackle. He left the game with 40 yards rushing, 32 of which were on one play. The Mountaineers, playing the second half without him, were held to 72 yards rushing for the game. Following the penalty, they punted 4 plays later. The Bobcats took over at their own 26 and scored three plays later to take a 10-point lead when Navarro found Hendricks from 31 yards out. WVU was again forced to punt and Ohio took a knee to end the half with a 17–7 lead.

West Virginia's offense got moving on the first drive of the second half, with the key play a Marchiol 45-yard pass to Bray, but the drive stalled on the 19-yard line and they settled for a Kade Hensley 38-yard field goal. With the Bobcats only up one score, Navarro ended each of Ohio's next three drive's with interceptions. In each case Ohio's defense responded by holding West Virginia to 3 and outs on their three ensuing drives. Ohio could not get a first down on their fourth drive of the half and were forced to punt from their own 29-yard line. Following the punt, the Mountaineers reached the Ohio 37 but were stopped on downs. The Bobcat's again failed to get a first down and their punt set WVU up and their 34-yard line with 6:18 remaining in the game. They reached Bobcat territory with a 1st down at the 47 at the 4:42 mark. On 1st down Nicco Marchiol was sacked by Michael Molnar. A 14-yard reception on 2nd down, followed by a false start penalty, gave WVU a 3rd and 9 at the Ohio 46 with 3:26 remaining. On 3rd down, Marachoil's pass was intercepted by Cam Hollobaugh. Ohio, trying to run out the clock, faced a 3rd and 9 and Navarro scrambled 10-yards to pick up a first down. On the next series, Ohio faced a 3rd and 16 when Navarro found Mason Williams for 13-yards. Ohio tried to seal the game by going for it on 4th and 3 from the WVU 29 but could only get 2-yards. After two Marchiol completions, he was sacked on the final play of the game by Anas Luqman before he could get off a hail mary attempt.

It was Ohio's defense that controlled the game. They held WVU to 2-of-13 on third-down conversions. Ohio outgained the Mountaineers 429 to 250. Ohio's offense controlled the ball for 40:15. Defensive end Nehemiah Dukes starred with six tackles, a sack, and a tackle for loss. Molnar led Ohio with seven total tackles and also had 1.5 tackles for loss and 1.5 sacks in route to winning MAC Defensive player of the week. In spite of the interceptions, Navarro continued to demonstrate his dual threat abilities with 247 yards passing and led the Bobcats in rushing with 87 yards. Chase Hendricks led the receivers with 121 yards and a touchdown.

=== at No. 1 Ohio State ===
Ohio Bobcats (1–1) at No. 1 Ohio State Buckeyes (2–0) – Game summary

Quarter	1	2	3	4	Total
Bobcats	0	3	6	0	9
No. 1 Buckeyes	3	10	10	14	37

at Ohio Stadium • Columbus, Oh

- Date: September 13
- Game time: 7:00 p.m. EDT
- Game weather: clear, Temperature:77 °F (25 °C), Wind: SW 5 mph (8.0 km/h)
- Game attendance: 105,765
- Referee: Bryan Banks (B10)
- TV announcers (Peacock): Paul Burmeister (play-by-play), Chris Simms (analyst), and Zora Stephenson (sideline reporter)
- Ohio notes, Ohio State notes • boxscore

Game information

First quarter

- (1:54) OSU – Jayden Fielding 38-yard field goal, 10 plays, 52 yards, 6:19; OSU 3–0

Second quarter

- (9:58) OSU – Jayden Fielding 20-yard field goal, 11 plays, 63 yards, 5:17; OSU 6–0
- (2:29) OSU – Max Klaire 16-yard pass from Julian Sayin (Jayden Fielding kick), 8 plays, 77 yards, 3:36; OSU 13–0
- (0:24) OHIO – Brack Peacock 44-yard field goal, 5 plays, 14 yards, 0:56; OSU 13–3

Third quarter

- (14:07) OHIO – Chase Hendricks 57-yard pass from Parker Navarro (kick failed), 2 plays, 75 yards, 0:53; OSU 13–9
- (11:19) OSU – Jayden Fielding 22-yard field goal, 5 plays, 71 yards, 2:48; OSU 16–9
- (6:16) OSU – Jeremiah Smith 47-yard pass from Julian Sayin (Jayden Fielding kick), 4 plays, 59 yards, 1:58; OSU 23–9

Fourth quarter

- (14:14) OSU – Carnell Tate 49-yard pass from Julian Sayin (Jayden Fielding kick), 8 plays, 85 yards, 3:49; OSU 30–9
- (6:36) OSU– Jeremiah Smith 17-yard run (Jayden Fielding kick), 5 plays, 59 yards, 2:53; OSU 37–9

Statistics	OHIO	OSU
First downs	9	28
Total yards	33–181	63–572
Rushing yards	34–68	31–225
Passing yards	113	347
Passing: Comp–Att–Int	10–21–0	25–32–2
Turnovers	1	2
Time of possession	27:17	32:43

Team	Category	Player	Statistics
Ohio	Passing	Parker Navarro	6/13, 94 yards, TD
Ohio	Rushing	Sieh Bangura	12 carries, 24 yards
Ohio	Receiving	Chase Hendricks	3 receptions, 76 yards, TD
Ohio State	Passing	Julian Sayin	25/32, 347 yards, 3 TD, 2 INT
Ohio State	Rushing	Bo Jackson	9 carries, 109 yards
Ohio State	Receiving	Jeremiah Smith	9 receptions, 153 yards, TD

Ohio travelled to Columbus to meet Ohio State. The Buckeyes came into the game as the nations top ranked team. The Buckeyes first two games featured very different opponents. They defeated preseason No. 1 Texas 14–7 in the first week and then, as the new No. 1, they crushed an outmatched Grambling, from the FCS, by a score of 70–0 the following week.

Ohio had faced Ohio State only seven times with the Buckeyes winning six and vacating a seventh win. The first game was in 1899 and the last matchup was the 43–7 vacated win for Ohio State in 2010 This was the first time in program history that Ohio faced the top ranked team in the AP poll.

Ohio State received the opening kickoff and after four plays has earned a first down on the Ohio 8-yard line. After an incompletion on 3rd down they faced a 4th and goal at the Ohio 4. Ohio State quarterback Julian Sayin was sacked by Anas Luqman to shutdown the drive. The Bobcats could only manage one first down on their first possession and were forced to punt. The Buckeyes went on a 10-play drive but were again faced with a 4th down at the Ohio 20 and chose to settle for a Jayden Fielding 38-yard field goal. Ohio then went three and out where Parker Navarro was hurt on a hit on a 3rd down pass attempt. the Buckeyes went on the march again buy an incompletion on the 10th play left them facing 4th down at the Ohio 2. They settled for another short field goal to go up by six points. Now led by backup quarterback Mick Poulos, the Bobcats were forced to puny after one first down again. Ohio State again marched deep into Bobcat territory. On 3rd and 10 from the Bobcat 16, they finally found the endzone when Sayin found Max Klare. The Buckeyes forced on Ohio three and out and after the Ohio punt took over at their own 22-yard line. On the 2nd play of the drive, Sayin's pass was deflected and then intercepted by Michael Mack II. The Bobcats settled for a 44-yard field goal off of the toe of Brack Peacock.

The Bobcats received the second half kickoff and Navarro reentered the game on their first possession. After an 8-yard scramble on first down, he hit Chase Hendricks on a 67-yard touchdown pass. The point after kick was missed off the upright but, with Ohio State struggling in the redzone, the Buckeye lead was cut to 13–9. On the ensuing drive the Buckeyes again settled for another short field goal on a 4th and 3 from the Ohio 3-yard line. Ohio State forced another Bobcat punt and their offense found its rhythm in the 2nd half. Their next two possessions ended on Sayin touchdown passes. The first was a 47-yard strike to All-American Jeremiah Smith and the second a 49-yard pass to Carnell Tate. After another Ohio punt, Sayin was intercepted by Austin Mitchell on the third play of the drive. On the ensuing drive, Ohio, facing 4th and 9 from the OSU 41, chose to go for it. A completion to Duncan Brune was stopped for no gain. The Buckeyes provided the final 37–9 margin when Smith ran it in from the Bobcat 17 with 6:36 remaining. Ohio mostly kept the ball on the ground on their final drive and they maintained possession until the clock ran out at the OSU 18.

Ohio State outgained Ohio by a 573 to 181-yard margin. Sayin threw for 347 yards and 4 touchdowns. Smith and Tate respectively finished with 153 and 101 yards receiving with one touchdown receiving each. Hendricks led the Bobcats with 76 receiving yards and a touchdown. Ohio State freshman running back Bo Jackson rushed for 109 yards on 9 carries. Navarro, missing close to half the game, was held to 94 passing yards. The Bobcats as a team were held to just 68 yards on the ground. Ohio safety Adonis Williams and linebacker Cam Hollobaugh led all defenders with 9 tackles each in the game.

=== vs. Gardner–Webb ===
Gardner–Webb Runnin' Bulldogs (2–1) at Ohio Bobcats (1–2) – Game summary

Quarter	1	2	3	4	Total
Runnin' Bulldogs	14	7	0	14	35
Bobcats	3	28	7	14	52

at Peden Stadium • Athens, OH

- Date: September 20
- Game time: 3:30 p.m. EDT
- Game weather: sunny, Temperature:87 °F (31 °C), Wind: E 4 mph (6.4 km/h)
- Game attendance: 22,312
- Referee: Matt Packowski (MAC)
- TV announcers (ESPN+): Kelsie Kasper (play-by-play) and Ryan Cavanaugh (analyst)
- Ohio notes, Gardner–Webb notes • boxscore

Game information

First quarter

- (06:31) GWEB – Quasean Holmes 8-yard run (Charles Viorel kick), 9 plays, 37 yards, 4:32; GWEB 7–0
- (03:24) OHIO – Brack Peacock 31-yard field goal, 7 plays, 26 yards, 0:57; GWEB 7–3
- (01:20) GWEB – Carson Gresock 48-yard run (Charles Viorel kick), 5 plays, 75 yards, 2:04; GWEB 14–3

Second quarter

- (12:59) OHIO – Duncan Brune 2-yard run (kick failed), 8 plays, 58 yards, 3:21; GWEB 14–9
- (12:59) OHIO – Sieh Bangura 8-yard run (Mason Williams pass from Parker Navarro), 7 plays, 69 yards, 2:53; OHIO 17–14
- (06:30) GWEB – Quasean Holmes 68-yard pass from Nate Hampton (Charles Viorel kick), 3 plays, 75 yards, 1:25; GWEB 21–17
- (05:01) OHIO – Chase Hendricks 43-yard pass from Parker Navarro (Brack Peacock kick), 5 plays, 75 yards, 1:29; OHIO 24–21
- (00:28) OHIO – Sieh Bangura 1-yard run (Brack Peacock kick), 8 plays, 80 yards, 1:21; OHIO 31–21

Third quarter

- (01:54) OHIO – Duncan Brune 1-yard run (Brack Peacock kick), 5 plays, 75 yards, 2:18; OHIO 38–21

Fourth quarter

- (14:06) GWEB – Chris Lofton 42-yard pass from Nate Hampton (Charles Viorel kick), 10 plays, 75 yards, 2:48; OHIO 38–28
- (11:25) OHIO – Sieh Bangura 32-yard run (Brack Peacock kick), 5 plays, 75 yards, 2:41; OHIO 45–28
- (07:48) GWEB – Quasean Holmes 5-yard run (Charles Viorel kick), 7 plays, 75 yards, 3:37; OHIO 45–35
- (04:00) OHIO – Duncan Brune 1-yard run (Brack Peacock kick), 6 plays, 45 yards, 3:48; OHIO 52–35

Statistics	GWEB	OHIO
First downs	16	33
Plays–yards	61–480	75–608
Rushes–yards	31–191	48–318
Passing yards	289	290
Passing: Comp–Att–Int	19–30–1	18–27–0
Turnovers	1	0
Time of possession	26:01	33:59

Team	Category	Player	Statistics
Gardner–Webb	Passing	Nate Hampton	19/28, 289 yards, 2 TD, INT
Gardner–Webb	Rushing	Carson Gresock	7 carries, 70 yards, TD
Gardner–Webb	Receiving	Anthony Lowe	8 receptions, 72 yards
Ohio	Passing	Parker Navarro	19/27, 290 yards, TD
Ohio	Rushing	Sieh Bangura	18 carries, 123 yards, 3 TD
Ohio	Receiving	Chase Hendricks	8 receptions, 144 yards, TD

The Bobcats hosted Gardner–Webb out of the FCS. The Bulldogs The Bulldogs came in with a wins over FCS opponents Western Carolina and The Citadel and with a loss to FBS opponent Georgia Tech. This was the fourth meeting of the two programs since 2007 with the last matchup being a 37–21 win for Ohio in 2016. The Bobcats entered with a 3–0 series edge.

The Bulldogs took the opening kickoff and immediately faced a 4th and 4 on their own 31. They came out in punt formation put upback Jackson Marshall scampered 35 yards for a first down on a fake punt. After another 17-yard run they had reached the Ohio 17. On the next play, quarterback Nate Hampton was intercepted by Michael Mack II. Starting on their own 12, the Bobcats could only gain two yards and they 4th down punt set up Gardner-Webb in good field possession. After another successful 4th down conversion on the next drive, Quasean Holmes then opened the scoring with an 8-yard touchdown run, capping a nine-play, 37-yard drive. The ensuing Ohio drive kicked off with a 58-yard return by Eamonn Dennis but sputtered after getting a first down on the Bulldog 12 and they settled for a short Brack Peacock field goal. Gardner Webb immediately responded when Carson Gresock broke off a 48-yard touchdown run through several missed tackles, extending the Bulldogs' lead to 14–3. The Bobcats began to rally back with a 2-yard touchdown run by Duncan Brune on the following drive and then forced a Bulldog three and out. Sieh Bangura scored on an 8-yard run, and after a missed extra point on their first touchdown, followed this one with a two-point conversion on a Mason Williams reception, putting Ohio ahead for the first time. The lead was very short lived. Hampton connected with Holmes on a short screen pass and he eluded or broke the tackle of numerous Bobcat defenders on a 68-yard run to paydirt. Ohio quickly answered, with Parker Navarro connecting with Chase Hendricks for a 43-yard touchdown pass to retake the lead. After a Bulldog punt, the Bobcats regained possession with 1:49 remaining in the game. A Parker Navarro 25-yard run set up Ohio at the 1-yard line with Sieh Bangura scored his second touchdown on a 1-yard plunge. Gardner-Webb chose not to end the half quietly and, after receiving the ball on Ohio 25 with 0:28 remaining, Hampton completed passes of 11, 21, and 7 yards. However, a Charlie Viorel 53-yad field goal came up short.

Ohio's first possession of the second half ended on an unsuccessful 4th down attempt at the Bulldog 41. Garner Webb punted 4 plays later. After another exchange of punts, Duncan Brune scored the lone touchdown of the quarter with a 1-yard run by Duncan Brune setup by a Williams reception, which extended Ohio's lead to 17. Ohio jumped offsides before another 4th down attempt on the ensuing drive. Several plays later Chris Lofton caught a pass behind the Ohio defense and scored from 42-yards out. Bangura quickly extended the lead again with his third touchdown on a 38-yad run. After another successful 4th down conversion, Holmes scored his third touchdown on a 5-yard run. Brune carried the load on Ohio's next drive and became the third player to score three times with a 1-yard blast. After a Bulldog punt, the Bobcats were able to hold on to the ball and run out the clock.

Several Bobcats had career days. Navarro's 290 passing yards, Hendricks 144 receiving yards, Dom Dowart's 51 receiving yards, Michael Molnar's 11 tackles, and Jalen Thomeson's 9 tackles were all so-far career highs. Bangura and Brune each scored three touchdowns and had 123 and 88 rushing yards respectively. Ohio outgained Gardner-Webb 609 to 482. Gardner-Webb's offense kept up most of the game aided by Hampton's 289 passing yards, several successful trick plays, and 5 for 5 on 4th down conversions with a 6th 4th down converted on an Ohio offsides.

=== vs. Bowling Green ===
Bowling Green Falcons (2–2) at Ohio Bobcats (2–2) – Game summary

Quarter	1	2	3	4	Total
Falcons	10	3	0	7	20
Bobcats	14	7	7	7	35

at Peden Stadium • Athens, OH

- Date: September 27
- Game time: 12:00 p.m. EDT
- Game weather: sunny, Temperature:77 °F (25 °C), Wind: NE 5 mph (8.0 km/h)
- Game attendance: 20,027
- Referee: William Williams (MAC)
- TV announcers (CBSSN): Jordan Kent (play-by-play) and Adam Breneman (analyst)
- Ohio notes, Bowling Green notes • boxscore

Game information

First quarter

- (12:59) OHIO – Cameron Hollobaugh 71-yard interception return (Brack Peacock kick); OHIO 7–0
- (10:02) BGSU – Kaderris Roberts 27-yard pass from Drew Pyne (Jackson Kleather kick), 6 plays, 75 yards, 2:57; Tied 7–7
- (05:35) OHIO – Mason Williams 19-yard pass from Parker Navarro (Brack Peacock kick), 10 plays, 75 yards, 4:27; OHIO 14–7
- (03:24) BGSU – Jackson Kleather 26-yard field goal, 8 plays, 63 yards, 2:57; OHIO 14–10

Second quarter

- (05:35) OHIO – Chase Hendricks 25-yard pass from Parker Navarro (Brack Peacock kick), 6 plays, 57 yards, 2:23; OHIO 21–10
- (03:24) BGSU – Jackson Kleather 33-yard field goal, 12 plays, 71 yards, 3:43; OHIO 21–13

Third quarter

- (05:42) OHIO – Parker Navarro 5-yard run (Brack Peacock kick), 3 plays, 27 yards, 1:27; OHIO 28–13

Fourth quarter

- (09:41) BGSU – Chris McMillian 15-yard run (Jackson Kleather kick), 6 plays, 55 yards, 1:48; OHIO 28–20
- (06:20) OHIO – Parker Navarro 34-yard run (Brack Peacock kick), 6 plays, 75 yards, 3:21; OHIO 35–20

Statistics	BGSU	OHIO
First downs	21	24
Plays–yards	65–350	64–439
Rushes–yards	36–180	39–231
Passing yards	170	208
Passing: Comp–Att–Int	19–29–3	17–25–1
Turnovers	4	3
Time of possession	30:31	29:29

Team	Category	Player	Statistics
Bowling Green	Passing	Drew Pyne	19/29, 170 yards, TD, 3 INT
Bowling Green	Rushing	Chris McMillian	11 carries, 89 yards
Bowling Green	Receiving	Finn Hogan	3 receptions, 51 yards
Ohio	Passing	Parker Navarro	7/25, 208 yards, 2 TD, INT
Ohio	Rushing	Sieh Bangura	18 carries, 115 yards
Ohio	Receiving	Mason Williams	8 receptions, 93 yards, TD

Ohio opened conference play by hosting Bowling Green. These programs didn't play in 2024 for the first time since 2003. Ohio won the last meeting in 2023 by a score of 38–7. Bowling Green leads the all-time series 42–31–2 but Ohio entered having won seven out of the last eight. The Falcons enter with a 2–2 mark with wins over Lafayette and Liberty and losses to Power 4 opponents Cincinnati and Louisville.

Cameron Pettaway returned the opening kickoff for Bowling Green to the Falcon 49. After three plays they had a first-down at the Bobcat 32. Drew Pyne’s pass was tipped by Jay Crable and then intercepted by Cameron Hollobaugh. Hollobaugh ran to his right, received a key block from Mike Molnar, and scampered 71-yards for a pick-six. Bowling Green didn't waste much time evening the score, facing a 3rd and 10 on the Ohio 27, Pyne found Kaderris Roberts in the deep middle behind the Ohio defense to tie the score. Ohio, they went on a 10-play drive behind the rushing of Sieh Bangura and three receptions by tight end Mason Williams, the last of which found paydirt from 19-yards. The Falcons obtained a 1st and goal at the Bobcat 10 on the ensuing drive but were forced to settle for a field goal to get within four points.

The teams opened the second quarter by exchanging punts. On Ohio's next drive Parker Navarro hit Chase Hendricks on a 25-yard bomb. It was the only reception of the day for Hendricks who entered the day leading the FBS in receiving yards. On the next Falcon drive they had a 2nd and 5 from the Bobcat 26-yard line when Pyne threw his second key interception of the first half when his attempt was caught by Tank Pearson. The Bobcats could not capitalize and were forced into a three and out. The Falcons then used most of the remaining time in the half as they kept the ball for 12-plays but were again forced to settle for another short field goal by Jackson Keather. Ohio took over with 0:45 on the clock. After six quick plays they reached the BGSU 29 but Brack Peacock's kick bounced off the left upright as the half expired.

On the first possession of what turned out to be a sloppy 2nd half, the Bobcats reached Falcon territory but Navarro was intercepted by JoJo Johnson. The Falcons went three and out but after Navarro hit Rodney Harris on a 35-yard pass, the Ohio drive with a strip sack by Myles Bradley on Navarro, recovered by Isaiah Thomison. Bowling Green could not capitalize on this turnover either as Hollobaugh and Cable teamed up on another turnover with a forced fumble and recovery respectively. This time Ohio capitalized and took some control over the game when, after two Bangura runs, Navarro took it in himself from the 5 with 5:42 remaining in the third quarter for a 15-point lead. Both teams were then held to quick three and out possessions.

Bowling Green was forced to punt again and pinned Ohio at their own 10-yard line early in the fourth quarter. Ohio quickly entered Falcon territory behind two rushes by Duncan Brune and two more Williams receptions. On a first-down form the 39-yard line Navarro wound up to throw deep to Hedricks who was double covered, for a sealing touchdown, but apparently thought better of it and fumbled the ball trying to stop his throwing motion. MJ Cannon recovered the ball at the 28 and kept BGSU in the game. On the 6th play of the ensuing drive a 15-yard touchdown rush by Chris McMillian got the Falcons within 8 with 9:41 remaining on the clock. The Bobcats responded on their next drive and a 34-yard touchdown scramble by Navarro. The Falcons were stopped on downs on the ensuing drive. Ohio went three and out and the Falcons took over with 3:35 on their own 15-yard line. Two plays later the outcome was sealed with DJ Walker picked-off Pyne for the third time and the Bobcats ran out the clock.

The game included seven turnovers. Pyne was intercepted three times and the Falcons lost a fumble. Navarro was intercepted once and fumbled twice. Ohio outgained Bowling Green 446 to 350. Outside of the turnovers, Navarro passed for 208 yards and a touchdown and scored twice on the ground. Mason Williams was on the receiving end eight times for 93 yards and a score. Bangura broke 100 yards rushing for the second straight game totaling 115 yards on the ground. Molnar led the Bobcats with 11 tackles. Hollobaugh's eight tackles, forced fumble, and pick-six earned him MAC Defensive Player of the Week. Pyne threw for 170 yards. Chris McMillian had 89 rushing yards and a touchdown for the Falcons.

=== at Ball State ===
Ohio Bobcats (3–2) at Ball State Cardinals (1–3) – Game summary

Quarter	1	2	3	4	Total
Bobcats	7	7	0	0	14
Cardinals	0	0	10	10	20

at Scheumann Stadium, Muncie, IN

- Date: October 4
- Game time: 12:00 p.m. EDT
- Game weather: sunny, Temperature:81 °F (27 °C), Wind: SW 6 mph (9.7 km/h)
- Game attendance: 8,427
- Referee: Chris La Mange (MAC)
- TV announcers (CBSSN): Fran Charles (play-by-play) and Randy Cross (analyst)
- Ohio notes, Ball State notes • boxscore

Game information

First quarter

- (04:39) OHIO – Duncan Brune 1-yard run (David Dellenbach kick), 5 plays, 50 yards, 1:58 OHIO 7–0

Second quarter

- (03:24) OHIO – Rodney Harris II 23-yard pass from Parker Navarro (David Dellenbach kick), 9 plays, 70 yards, 3:57; OHIO 14–0

Third quarter

- (07:05) BALL – Kiael Kelly 13-yard run (Carson Holmer kick), 11 plays, 80 yards, 5:27; OHIO 14–7
- (00:25) BALL – Carson Holmer 22-yard field goal, 8 plays, 48 yards, 3:23; OHIO 14–10

Fourth quarter

- (08:39) BALL – -1-yard team safety; OHIO 14–12
- (00:57) BALL – Qian Magwood 43-yard pass pass from Kiael Kelly (Kiael Kelly Pass to Donovan Hamilton), 9 plays, 70 yards, 2:07; BALL 20–14

Statistics	OHIO	BALL
First downs	18	20
Plays–yards	66–356	75–357
Rushes–yards	37–168	42–172
Passing yards	188	185
Passing: Comp–Att–Int	16–29–0	17–33–0
Turnovers	0	0
Time of possession	28:09	31:51

Team	Category	Player	Statistics
Ohio	Passing	Parker Navarro	16/29, 188 yards, TD
Ohio	Rushing	Parker Navarro	13 carries, 77 yards
Ohio	Receiving	Chase Hendricks	8 receptions, 104 yards
Ball State	Passing	Kiael Kelly	17/33, 185 yards
Ball State	Rushing	Kiael Kelly	29 carries, 66 yards, TD
Ball State	Receiving	Qian Magwood	4 receptions, 92 yards, TD

The Bobcats traveled to Muncie, Indiana to face Ball State. This will be the Cardinals first MAC game of the season. Ball State entered with a record of 1–3 with their only win over FCS New Hampshire and losses to Power 4 opponents Purdue and Auburn as well as a loss to UConn. Ohio and Ball State had played 28 times since 1975 with the Bobcats winning 13. The Bobcats had won the last 5 with the last matchup a 42–21 win the 2024 regular season finale.

Ohio received the opening kickoff and marched into Ball State territory. A holding penalty stalled the drive and then the Ohio kicking woes continued as David Dellenbach missed a 49-yard field goal. After a Cardinal punt, Sieh Bangura's 29-yard run set the Bobcats up on the Ball State 16-yard line on their second drive. After a facemask penalty set them back Ohio elected to go for it on 4th and 2. However, Bangura's rush was a yard short of the first down. After the Cardinal's second straight three and out, Ohio's third drive finally ended in a score, setup by an Chase Hendricks 37-yad catch and finished with a 1-yard blast b Duncan Brune. Ball State was forced to punt again, but Ohio's ensuing 12-play drive was stopped in Cardinal territory short of field goal range and the Bobcats were forced to punt. The Cardinals were forced to punt yet again and set the Bobcats up at their own 30. Navarro found Rodney Harris II for his first career touchdown reception to put the Bobcat's up 14–0. On their final possession of the half, it was Ball State's turn to reach Ohio territory and fail to capitalize. The Cardinals were stopped by Ohio's defense inside the 5-yard line on four straight plays just before the half.

The teams exchanged three and out drives to open the second half. Ball State finally got on the board when quarterback Kiael Kelly scored on a 13-yard rushing touchdown. Ohio again reached Ball State territory on the following drive but were stopped with a 4-yard loss on a 4th and 1 setting Ball State up with good field position. They capitalized with a Carson Holmer 22-yard field goal. Ohio's ensuing drive stalled at their own 49 and they elected to punt this time and pinned the Cardinals at their own 6. From there, Ball State was eventually forced to punt from their own 37 when Adam Saul's 62-yard punt put Ohio on their own 1-yard line. On 1st down, Navarro mishandled the snap and Bangura fell on it and was downed in the endzone for a safety to make the score 14–12. After the teams exchanged punts, the Cardinals went on a 9-play scoring drive, capped by a Kiael Kelly 43-yard touchdown pass to Qian Magwood, to give Ball State its first lead with 0:57 remaining. Ohio reached the BSU 30 at the 2-second mark. Navarro's final pass attempt fell incomplete in the end zone to seal the Cardinal victory.

Ohio outgained Ball State by 1 yard after compiling a huge 1st half edge in that category. Kelly led the Cardinals with 185 passing yards and 96 rushing yards. Navarro also led Ohio in both categories with 188 passing yards and 77 rushing yards. Magwood led Ball State with 92 receiving yards including the game winning touchdown. Hendricks led all receivers with 104 yards, giving him is 4th 100-yard game of the season so far. Adonis Williams and Michael Molnar led all tacklers with 11 each for the Bobcats. Nathan Voorhis 3.5 sack performance won him MAC Defensive Player of the Week for the Cardinals as their defense shutout Ohio in the 2nd half.

=== vs. Northern Illinois ===
Northern Illinois Huskies (1–5) at Ohio Bobcats (3–3) – Game summary

Quarter	1	2	3	4	Total
Huskies	0	8	6	7	21
Bobcats	14	7	13	14	48

at Peden Stadium • Athens, OH

- Date: October 18
- Game time: 3:30 p.m. EDT
- Game weather: sunny, Temperature:78 °F (26 °C), Wind: SSW 9 mph (14 km/h)
- Game attendance: 22,293
- Referee: Rich Edwards (MAC)
- TV announcers (ESPN+): Doug Sherman (play-by-play) and Je'Rod Cherry (analyst)
- Ohio notes, Northern Illinois notes • boxscore

Game information

First quarter

- (12:47) OHIO – Sieh Bangura 2-yard run (David Dellenbach kick), 2 plays, 14 yards, 0:39; OHIO 7–0
- (05:03) OHIO – Parker Navarro 17-yard run (David Dellenbach kick), 11 plays, 91 yards, 5:15; OHIO 14–0

Second quarter

- (12:13) OHIO – Sieh Bangura 5-yard run (David Dellenbach kick), 10 plays, 66 yards, 3:47; OHIO 21–0
- (10:08) NIU – Devon Akers 7-yard pass from Josh Holst (Josh Holst Pass to George Dimopoulos), 4 plays, 20 yards, 1:56; OHIO 21–8

Third quarter

- (13:49) OHIO – Duncan Brune 66-yard run (kick failed), 3 plays, 75 yards, 1:11; OHIO 27–8
- (07:40) OHIO – Duncan Brune 4-yard run (David Dellenbach kick), 9 plays, 97 yards, 4:50; OHIO 34–8
- (06:04) NIU – DeAree Rogers 50-yard pass from Josh Holst (run failed), 4 plays, 70 yards, 1:30; OHIO 34–14

Fourth quarter

- (14:55) OHIO – Sieh Bangura 1-yard run (David Dellenbach kick), 11 plays, 75 yards, 6:09; OHIO 41–14
- (12:08) NIU – Chavon Wright 1-yard run (Andrew Glass kick), 8 plays, 75 yards, 2:47; OHIO 41–21
- (02:52) OHIO – Jalen Thomeson 91-yard fumble return (David Dellenbach kick), OHIO 48–21

Statistics	NIU	OHIO
First downs	15	27
Plays–yards	56–293	75–538
Rushes–yards	26–132	52–333
Passing yards	161	205
Passing: Comp–Att–Int	21–30–0	17–23–1
Turnovers	1	1
Time of possession	24:10	35:50

Team	Category	Player	Statistics
Northern Illinois	Passing	Josh Holst	21/29, 161 yards, 2 TD
Northern Illinois	Rushing	Telly Johnson Jr.	11 carries, 64 yards
Northern Illinois	Receiving	DeAree Rogers	7 receptions, 107 yards, TD
Ohio	Passing	Parker Navarro	17/23, 205 yards, INT
Ohio	Rushing	Sieh Bangura	22 carries, 147 yards, 3 TD
Ohio	Receiving	Chase Hendricks	10 receptions, 108 yards

Ohio hosted Northern Illinois for their homecoming. The Huskies entered the game with a 1–5 record and winless in their first two MAC games. Northern Illinois entered on a five game skid since winning their season opener against FCS Holy Cross. This was the last regular season MAC matchup between the schools before NIU joins the Mountain West Conference for football in 2026. Ohio was 11–14 all-time against NIU with the last matchup being a 23–13 Huskie upset victory in 2023.

After forcing a Northern Illinois three-and-out on the game's opening drive, Ohio's Chase Hendricks returned the punt 53 yards. Two plays later, running back Sieh Bangura scored on a two-yard touchdown run. After another NIU punt, the Bobcats orchestrated a long, 11-play, 91-yard drive, which was capped off by a nine-yard rushing touchdown from quarterback Parker Navarro. NIU was again forced to punt on their third possession. Ohio went on another long 10-play drive. Sieh Bangura recorded his second touchdown of the game on a five-yard run to put Ohio up 21–0 early in the 2nd quarter. Dev'ion Reynolds returned the ensuing kickoff for 67 yds to the Ohio 20-yard line for NIU. Quarterback Josh Holst connected with tight end Devon Akers for a seven-yard touchdown a few plays later. Ohio again held the ball for 10-plays but facing a 4th and 19 from the NIU 36 after a Roy Williams sack of Navarro, the Bobcats could neither go for it or kick a long field goal. Placekicker David Dellenbach attempted a quick-kick out of field goal formation to try to pin the Huskies deep. NIU was again held to a three-and-out setting up Ohio at their own 35. On the eight play of the following drive, Navarro's hail mary attempt was intercepted by James Finley as the half expired.

Ohio received the second-half kickoff. After a pair of short runs, running back Duncan Brune broke free for a 66-yard rushing touchdow on Ohio's opening drive of the second half, though the extra point was missed by Dellenbach. This extended Ohio's lead to 27–8. After forcing another Northern Illinois three-and-out, Brune scored again on a four-yard run, which followed a 97-yard drive, making the score a lopsided 34–8. NIU's offense finally got going as Josh Holst connected with wide receiver DeAree Rogers for a 50-yard touchdown on the ensuing drive. The two-point conversion run attempt failed. On the first play of the fourth quarter, Sieh Bangura scored his third rushing touchdown of the game on a one-yard run to cap off an 11-play drive. Northern Illinois responded with a one-yard touchdown run by Chavon Wright, capping off an eight-play, 75-yard drive to make the score to 41–21. With Ohio's kicking game struggling they elected to go for it on fourth down from the NIU 24 on their next possession and failed. NIU marched to the Ohio 13 when on the 14th play of the drive, on a quarterback rush, Charlie Christopher forced a fumble and Jalen Thompson picked it up on the 9-yard line for a 91-yard scoop and score. Down 48–21 with 1:54 remaining, NIU elected to go for it on fourth down from their own 38 and failed to convert. As NIU used their timeouts on Ohio's possession, the Bobcats converted a first down and then ran out the clock.

The Bobcats' victory was led by a dominant running game, with running backs Sieh Bangura and Duncan Brune combining for 272 rushing yards and five touchdowns. Bangura led the charge with 147 rushing yards and three touchdowns in route to sharing MAC Offensive player of the week honors. Ohio rushed for six touchdowns in total, accumulating 333 rushing yards on the ground and 538 total yards of offense to 293 for Northern Illinois. By running the ball effectively, Ohio was able to dominate the time of possession with 35:50 compared to NIU's 24:10. The ground game consistently moved the chains, helping Ohio achieve 27 first downs to NIU's 15. Parker Navarro threw for 205 yards with one interception and added a rushing touchdown. Chase Hendricks had 10 receptions for 108 yards while setting up the touchdown after returning a punt to the Huskies' 14-yard line. Linebacker Charlie Christopher led Ohio with 7 tackles. For NIU, Josh Holst passed for 161 yards and two touchdowns. Wide receiver DeAree Rogers had a breakout game with 107 receiving yards and a 50-yard touchdown reception. On defense, Quinn Urwiler led the all players with 12 tackles.

=== at Eastern Michigan ===
Ohio Bobcats (4–3) at Eastern Michigan Eagles (2–6) – Game summary

Quarter	1	2	3	4	Total
Bobcats	7	0	7	14	28
Eagles	14	0	0	7	21

at Rynearson Stadium • Ypsilanti, MI

- Date: October 25
- Game time: 12:00 p.m. EDT
- Game weather: sunny, Temperature:48 °F (9 °C), Wind: S 5 mph (8.0 km/h)
- Game attendance: 15,985
- Referee: Rick Warne (MAC)
- TV announcers (CBSSN): Jordan Kent (play-by-play) and Logan Ryan (analyst)
- Ohio notes, Eastern Michigan notes • boxscore

Game information

First quarter

- (11:07) EMU – Nick Devereaux 38-yard pass from Noah Kim (Rudy Kessinger kick), 9 plays, 75 yards, 3:53; EMU 7–0
- (08:08) OHIO – Chase Hendricks 28-yard pass from Parker Navarro (Brack Peacock kick), 6 plays, 83 yards, 2:52; Tied 7–7
- (05:01) EMU – Noah Kim 3-yard run (Rudy Kessinger Kick), 6 plays, 72 yards, 2:59; EMU 14–7

Second quarter

- No scoring plays.

Third quarter

- (04:01) OHIO – Sieh Bangura 1-yard run (Brack Peacock kick), 10 plays, 67 yards, 5:45; Tied 14–14

Fourth quarter

- (13:36) OHIO – Chase Hendricks 14-yard pass from Parker Navarro (Brack Peacock kick), 6 plays, 70 yards, 2:37; OHIO 21–14
- (02:15) OHIO – Sieh Bangura 2-yard run (Brack Peacock kick), 6 plays, 69 yards, 2:35; OHIO 28–14
- (01:38) EMU – Nick Devereaux 17-yard pass from Noah Kim (Rudy Kessinger kick), 4 plays, 75 yards, 0:36; OHIO 28–21

Statistics	OHIO	EMU
First downs	25	17
Plays–yards	74–487	55–371
Rushes–yards	45–172	25–112
Passing yards	315	259
Passing: Comp–Att–Int	23–29–2	21–30–0
Turnovers	2	1
Time of possession	35:40	24:20

Team	Category	Player	Statistics
Ohio	Passing	Parker Navarro	23/28, 315 yards, 2 TD, 2 INT
Ohio	Rushing	Sieh Bangura	18 carries, 100 yards, 2 TD
Ohio	Receiving	Chase Hendricks	10 receptions, 112 yards, 2 TD
Eastern Michigan	Passing	Noah Kim	21/30, 259 yards, 2 TD
Eastern Michigan	Rushing	Dontae McMillian	10 carries, 49 yards
Eastern Michigan	Receiving	Nick Devereaux	5 receptions, 121 yards, 2 TD

Ohio travelled to Eastern Michigan for their final Saturday game of the season before midweek "MACtion" begins. Eastern Michigan entered 2–6 on the season and 1–3 in conference play. EMU was coming in off a loss to Miami. Ohio led the all-time series 21–12–1. Ohio had won the last three in the series including a 35–10 victory last season.

On the game's opening drive, the Eagles drove down the field quickly, with the drive culminating in a 38-yard touchdown pass from quarterback Noah Kim to wide receiver Nick Devereaux. Ohio quickly answered Eastern Michigan's opening score. Quarterback Parker Navarro connected with wide receiver Chase Hendricks for a 28-yard touchdown pass to tie the game at 7–7. The Eagles responded with another fast drive. Quarterback Noah Kim capped off the drive with a 3-yard rushing touchdown to regain the lead for Eastern Michigan, 14–7. Ohio failed to respond as Eastern Michigan's defense forced an Ohio three-and-out. Ohio's defense kept the game close with a stop of their own.

Ohio started their own 35 near the end of the first quarter. After eight plays they faced a 4th and 2 on the EMU 15. They elected to go for it but Parker Navarro's keeper was stopped a yard short. This was the first of several drives for Ohio into EMU territory with no points. The Eagles were forced to punt and Ohio embarked on a 15-play drive that ended with Navarro being intercepted by Tyrelle Deener deep in EMU territory with 1:02 remaining in the half. With Eastern Michigan staring at their own 3, Ohio elected to use their timeouts as their defense forced a three-and-out. Ohio drove to the EMU 33 and spiked the ball with 0:04 on the clock. Navarro's hail mary attempt was caught by Rodney Harris but negated by an ineligible man downfield. After a failed attempt with EMU having 12 men on the field, Navarro's third attempt was intercepted by Juan Salas.

The Bobcats opened the second half with another drive ending in EMU territory. Facing a 4th on 14 on the 34-yard line with a struggling kicking game Ohio's offense stayed on the field but Navarro's quick kick resulted in a touchback. Ohio's defense held the Eagles and the Bobcats took over again at their own 33 and followed with a 10-play drive that culminated in Sieh Bangura's first touchdown rush to tie the game at 14. Eastern Michigan responded with a long drive of their own but a 48-yard field goal attempt by Rudy Kessinger went wide right.

The Bobcats took their first lead when the ensuing drive ended with 14-yard touchdown pass from Parker Navarro to Chase Hendricks early in the fourth quarter. Ohio's defense forced another three-and-out but their next drive ended with EMU's defense doing the same. Eastern Michigan took over at their own 19 and a few plays later a Kim was stripped of the ball by Puis Odjugo and it was recovered by linebacker Charlie Christopher. Ohio could not capitalize as their offense stalled and Brack Peacock's 35-yard field goal attempt missed badly to the left. Ohio's defense held EMU to 3 plays again. Ohio took control with a long, 69-yard drive. The drive was highlighted by hard-running from Sieh Bangura, who had a 22-yard and a 33-yard runs and a 2-yard touchdown run to put the Bobcats ahead 28–14 with 2:15 left. The Eagle's hurry-up offense quickly yielded a touchdown in just four plays with the possession ending in a 17-yard touchdown pass from Kim to Devereaux with 1:39 remaining. The onside kick was recovered by the Bobcats who ran out the clock.

Ohio's offense generated a total of 487 yards to EMU's 371, controlling the tempo and possession for over 35 minutes of the game. Parker Navarro had a career-best day through the air as he threw for 315 yards and two touchdowns in route to winning his second MAC Offensive Player of the Week Award on the season. Sieh Bangura led the team with 100 rushing yards and two touchdowns on the ground. The Bobcats amassed a total of 172 rushing yards, with Navarro contributing 63 yards on the ground as well. Chase Hendricks again led the Bobcats receivers with 10 catches for 112 yards and two touchdowns. It was his sixth 100-yard performance in the first eight games. Rodney Harris II also crossed the 100-yard receiving mark, hauling in six passes for 103 yards. Nickelback Jalen Thomeson led Bobcat tacklers with 11 while linebacker Charlie Christopher contributed 10 tackles and a fumble recovery. Eastern Michigan quarterback Noah Kim threw for 259 yards and two touchdowns in the loss. Nick Devereaux was the Eagles leading receiver, catching five passes for 121 yards and both Eagles’ receiving touchdowns. Dontae McMillian rushed for 49 yards. Bryce Llewellyn led all tacklers with 13.

=== vs. Miami (OH) (Battle of the Bricks) ===
Miami RedHawks (5–3) at Ohio Bobcats (5–3) – Game summary

Quarter	1	2	3	4	Total
RedHawks	0	3	3	14	20
Bobcats	0	3	7	14	24

at Peden Stadium • Athens, OH

- Date: November 4
- Game time: 7:00 p.m. EST
- Game weather: sunny, Temperature:46 °F (8 °C), Wind: N 0 mph (0 km/h)
- Game attendance: 22,231
- Referee: Chris La Mange (MAC)
- TV announcers (ESPN2): Clay Matvick (play-by-play) and Chase Daniel (analyst)
- Ohio notes, Miami notes • boxscore

Game information

First quarter

- (01:57) M-OH – Dom Dzioban 23-yard field goal, 13 plays, 74 yards, 8:53; M-OH 3–0
- (00:07) OHIO – David Dellenbach 35-yard field goal, 10 plays, 47 yards, 1:50; Tied 3–3

Second quarter

- No scoring plays.

Third quarter

- (08:15) M-OH – Dom Dzioban 46-yard field goal, 4 plays, 7 yards, 2:07; M-OH 6–3
- (04:37) OHIO – Sieh Bangura 22-yard run (David Dellenbach kick), 8 plays, 75 yards, 3:38; OHIO 10–6

Fourth quarter

- (13:29) M-OH – Braylon Isom 4-yard pass from Dequan Finn (Dom Dzioban kick), 11 plays, 60 yards, 5:59; M-OH 13–10
- (13:15) OHIO – Sieh Bangura 97-yard kickoff return (David Dellenbach kick), OHIO 17–13
- (09:29) M-OH – Kam Perry 27-yard pass from Dequan Finn (Dom Dzioban kick), 7 plays, 75 yards, 3:04; M-OH 20–17
- (02:15) OHIO – Rodney Harris II 49-yard pass from Parker Navarro (David Dellenbach kick), 5 plays, 75 yards, 3:04; OHIO 24–20

Statistics	M-OH	OHIO
First downs	16	19
Plays–yards	56–303	62–308
Rushes–yards	31–109	31–137
Passing yards	194	201
Passing: Comp–Att–Int	17–25–1	16–31–1
Turnovers	1	2
Time of possession	32:50	27:10

Team	Category	Player	Statistics
Miami (OH)	Passing	Dequan Finn	17/25, 194 yards, 2 TD, INT
Miami (OH)	Rushing	Jordan Brunson	15 carries, 49 yards
Miami (OH)	Receiving	Cole Weaver	6 receptions, 94 yards
Ohio	Passing	Parker Navarro	16/31, 201 yards, TD, INT
Ohio	Rushing	Sieh Bangura	17 carries, 102 yards, TD
Ohio	Receiving	Rodney Harris II	5 receptions, 92 yards, TD

Ohio renewed its Battle of the Bricks rivalry with Miami in the first mid-week "MACtion" game of the season. It was the first time the schools have met since a 38–3 Ohio win in the MAC Championship game last season. Miami led the rivalry series 56–43–2. Ohio had won 14 of the last 19. Miami entered the game at 5–3 but on a five game winning streak with an unbeaten 4–0 record in conference play after losing their first three non-conference games and an 11-game winning streak in MAC regular season games. They were coming off of a 26–17 win against Western Michigan, who also had an unblemished conference record, to obtain sole possession of first place.

After receiving the opening kickoff, Ohio was unable to move the ball and went three-and-out. Miami reached the Ohio 40 on their first drive and chose to punt on 4th and 4. After the punt, Ohio was pinned deep at its own 1-yard line. Ohio held the ball for 8-plays to help flip the field position. After a RedHawk three-and-out and fair catch on the punt, Ohio took over on their 25 this time. Ohio drove into Miami territory but a deep pass into the end zone ended the drive when Eli Coppess, a safety in man coverage with Chase Hendricks, ripped the ball away with both players falling to the ground, and turned a potential touchdown into an interception. Ohio's defense responded to the turnover and held Miami to another three-and-out early in the 2nd quarter. Ohio held the ball for 7 plays but were again forced to punt. Miami then took over on their own 21. RedHawks' drive then consumed a most of the time remaining in the half, taking 13 plays and covering 74 yards over 8:53, to finally strike first on a 23-yard field goal by Dom Dzioban. Miami had a first and goal on the Bobcat 2-yard line but 3 consecutive runs could not reach pay dirt. A false start penalty before a 4th down attempt at the 1-yard line forced the field goal. Ohio responded after the kickoff, running 10 plays and using only 1:50 to set up a 35-yard field goal by David Dellenbach to tie the game. Miami elected to run out the half and took a knee.

Miami opened the second half with a punt on their first possession. Miami's defense created the first big play of the second half when linebacker Corbin Hondru forced and recovered a fumble from Ohio quarterback Parker Navarro at the Ohio 36-yard line. The RedHawks capitalized on the turnover, but with only a field goal, driving 7 yards before kicker Dom Dzioban converted a 46-yard field goal, giving Miami a 6–3 lead with 8:15 remaining in the quarter. Ohio's offense finally found its stride, marching 75 yards in eight plays. Sieh Bangura broke through for a 22-yard rushing touchdown to cap the drive to give Ohio a 10–6 their first lead with 4:37 left in the quarter.

Miami responded and moved the ball 60 yards in 11 plays before scoring a touchdown with a 4-yard touchdown pass from Dequan Finn to Braylon Isom early in the fourth. On the ensuing kickoff, Ohio's Sieh Bangura faked a reverse and ran 97 yards for a touchdown. These were the first two of four eventual lead changes in the quarter and put Ohio ahead 17–13 with 13:15 left. Miami responded with a touchdown drive of their own, moving 65 yards in seven plays. Dequan Finn connected with Kam Perry for a 27-yard touchdown pass to give the RedHawks a 20–17 lead with 9:29 remaining. Ohio's offense could only get one first down and was forced to punt. Needing urgently to get the ball back the Bobcat defense forced three-and-out possession. After the punt, the Bobcats took over at their own 25 with 5:19 remaining. In what turned out to be the game-winning touchdown drive, a key facemask penalty on Miami kept the drive alive. Quarterback Parker Navarro then threw a 49-yard touchdown pass to Rodney Harris II with 2:15 on the clock. The pass gave Ohio a 24–20 lead. One the first play of the ensuing drive Finn found Isom at the Miami 46, but the drive ended on the next play when Ohio's Jalen Thomeson intercepted a pass near the sideline with just over a minute left. Behind Bangura's rushing, Ohio got a first down and was then able to run out the clock.

Ohio finished with 338 total yards, slightly more than Miami's 303. Ohio had a more productive rushing attack, gaining 137 yards on 31 attempts, while Miami rushed for 109 yards on 31 attempts. Sieh Bangura was the game's standout player with 229 all-purpose yards. He rushed for 102 yards and a touchdown, and ran a kickoff back for a touchdown en route to winning MAC Co-Special Teams Player of the Week. The teams were closely matched through the air. Ohio quarterback Parker Navarro threw for 201 yards with one touchdown and one interception. Miami's Dequan Finn passed for 194 yards while throwing two touchdowns and one interception. Rodney Harris II led Bobcat receivers had 92 receiving yards on five catches, with his last being the game-winner. This was only the second time in the first nine games that Chase Hendricks, who was held to three receptions and 40 yards, didn't lead Ohio. Cole Weaver was Finn's top target, catching six passes for 94 yards. Corbin Hondru led all players defensively, racking up 17 tackles, a sack, and forcing and recovering a fumble. Charlie Christopher led Ohio with 12 tackles and 0.5 sacks.

Ohio's win made them the first MAC team to reach bowl eligibility and extended their home winning streak to 12 with the last loss being at the hands of the RedHawks in 2023. Twelve is now the longest home winning streak in program history. It created a log jam atop the MAC standings with Ohio, Miami, Western Michigan, and Buffalo all sharing first-place at 4–1 within the conference.

=== at Western Michigan ===
Ohio Bobcats (6–3) at Western Michigan Broncos (5–4) – Game summary

Quarter	1	2	3	4	Total
Bobcats	7	0	0	6	13
Broncos	3	0	7	7	17

at Waldo Stadium • Kalamazoo, MI

- Date: November 11
- Game time: 8:00 p.m. EST
- Game weather: clear, Temperature:33 °F (1 °C), Wind: SW 10 mph (16 km/h)
- Game attendance: 10,849
- Referee: Matt Packowski (MAC)
- TV announcers (ESPN2): Clay Matvick (play-by-play) and Chase Daniel (analyst)
- Ohio notes, WMU Notes • boxscore

Game information

First quarter

- (10:19) WMU – Palmer Domschke 46-yard field goal, 4 plays, 5 yards, 2:07; WMU 3–0
- (01:07) OHIO – Parker Navarro 2-yard run (David Dellenbach kick), 9 plays, 64 yards, 5:02; OHIO 7–3

Second quarter

- No scoring plays

Third quarter

- (10:09) WMU – Broc Lowry 1-yard run (Palmer Domschke kick), 8 plays, 68 yards, 4:45; WMU 10–7

Fourth quarter

- (14:55) OHIO – Sieh Bangura 3-yard run (kick failed), 17 plays, 83 yards, 10:08; OHIO 13–10
- (13:43) WMU – Jalen Buckley 3-yard run (Palmer Domschke kick), 3 plays, 75 yards, 1:12; WMU 17–13

Statistics	OHIO	WMU
First downs	15	16
Plays–yards	58–287	56–336
Rushes–yards	39–217	42–210
Passing yards	70	126
Passing: Comp–Att–Int	8–19–1	9–14–0
Turnovers	1	0
Time of possession	28:46	31:14

Team	Category	Player	Statistics
Ohio	Passing	Parker Navarro	8/19, 70 yards, INT
Ohio	Rushing	Parker Navarro	18 carries, 105 yards, TD
Ohio	Receiving	Mason Williams	2 receptions, 20 yards
Western Michigan	Passing	Broc Lowry	9/14, 126 yards
Western Michigan	Rushing	Broc Lowry	18 carries, 92 yards, TD
Western Michigan	Receiving	Talique Williams	1 receptions, 71 yards

The Bobcats traveled to Kalamazoo to take on Western Michigan. The Broncos entered the game at 5–4 on the season, having started the year by losing their first three game outside the conference, but in a four way tie for first place in the MAC at 4–1. The winner maintained control of their own destiny. Western Michigan was coming off of a winning the Victory Cannon against Central Michigan. WMU led the series 34–31–1. Ohio had won the last two with last matchup a 20–17 win in 2023.

Ohio opened the game with a promising drive that was abruptly ended when Parker Navarro threw an interception to Western Michigan safety Tate Hallock, who returned the ball to the Ohio 33-yard line. Western Michigan capitalized on the turnover but settled for a 46-yard field goal by Palmer Domschke, putting them up 3–0. The teams exchanged punts on the next two drives. The next Ohio drive covered 64 yards over nine plays and was spearheaded by the running game. Navarro capped off the drive with a 2-yard touchdown run, giving Ohio a 7–3 lead late in the first quarter. WMU then kept the ball for 13 plays but failed to score when Domschke missed a short field goal. After a Bobcat three-and-out the Broncos reached the Ohio 34 but were stopped on a 4th and 1. The next three drives were all short possessions quickly ending in punts before WMU took a knee on their final possession of the first half.

WMU received the second half kickoff and with an 8-play, 68-yard drive that lasted 4 minutes and 45 seconds, the Broncos reclaimed the lead. Quarterback Broc Lowry capped the drive with a one-yard touchdown run at the 10:09 mark, bringing the score to 10–7. Ohio took possession and began a run-heavy drive that carried into the fourth quarter. The 17-play, 83-yard drive featured 16 rushing attempts and took more than 10 minutes off the clock. The Bobcats' ground game was successful throughout the drive, with quarterback Parker Navarro and running back Sieh Bangura both carries to maintain possession. This sustained possession ultimately concluded with a Bangura touchdown run early in the fourth quarter, giving Ohio a 13–10 lead after a failed extra point kick. The Broncos quickly responded with a three play touchdown drive to regain the lead. The key play was a short pass to Tailique Williams on the 2nd play. He caught the ball behind the line of scrimmage, avoided going out of bounds and eluded numerous Ohio defenders before finally going down at the Ohio 3. Jalen Buckley took in on the next play. Ohio was forced to punt and WMU looked like it would take control with a 13-play drive but it ended in another short missed field goal. Given the ball with 2:40 remaining, Ohio was forced to go for it on 4th and 20 after a sack on the first series and could not convert. After taking over on the Ohio 10, WMU took knees to kill clock but gave Ohio the ball back on downs with 0:16 remaining. The game ended three plays later.

Western Michigan outgained Ohio with 336 total yards compared to Ohio's 287. Ohio had a slight advantage on the ground, accumulating 217 rushing yards. However, Western Michigan was not far behind with 210 rushing yards. Western Michigan quarterback Lowry was more effective through the air, with 126 passing yards. Ohio's passing offense struggled, with Navarro managing only 70 yards. Both Quarterbacks led their teams in rushing. Navarro had 105 yards and scored a touchdown. Lowry ran for 92 yards and a touchdown. Bangura nearly also broke the century mark for the Bobcats with 97 yards and scored a touchdown. WMU running back Jalen Buckley had 82 rushing yards and also found the end zone with a short rushing touchdown. Bobcats linebacker Jack Fries led all players with 11 total tackles.

With the victory, the Broncos gained bowl eligibility, took sole possession of first place in the conference with a 5–1 MAC record and improved to 6–4 overall. The win allowed them to control their path to the MAC Championship while Ohio fell in to a second place log jam in need of help to reach Detroit.

=== vs. UMass ===
UMass Minutemen (0–10) at Ohio Bobcats (6–4) – Game summary

Quarter	1	2	3	4	Total
Minutemen	7	0	7	0	14
Bobcats	7	14	7	14	42

at Peden Stadium • Athens, Ohio

- Date: November 18
- Game time: 7:00 p.m. EST
- Game weather: Rain, Mist, Temperature:42 °F (6 °C), Wind: SE 6 mph (9.7 km/h)
- Game attendance: 12,438
- Referee: Rick Warne (MAC)
- TV announcers (CBSSN): Fran Charles (play-by-play) and Taylor McHargue (analyst)
- Ohio notes, UMass notes • boxscore

Game information

First quarter

- (12:05) MASS – Owen Anderson 10-yard pass from Brandon Rose (Derek Morris Kick), 7 plays, 75 yards, 2:55; MASS 7–0
- (06:03) OHIO – Parker Navarro 2-yard run (David Dellenbach kick), 11 plays, 70 yards, 6:00; Tied 7–7

Second quarter

- (07:12) OHIO – Duncan Brune 13-yard run (David Dellenbach kick), 7 plays, 64 yards, 4:23; OHIO 14–7
- (03:44) OHIO – Sieh Bangura 3-yard run (David Dellenbach kick), 5 plays, 27 yards, 2:10; OHIO 21–7

Third quarter

- (08:56) MASS – Elijah Pedro 9-yard pass from Grant Jordan (Derek Morris Kick), 10 plays, 48 yards, 4:27; OHIO 21–14
- (03:57) OHIO – Sieh Bangura 2-yard run (David Dellenbach kick), 10 plays, 73 yards, 4:59; OHIO 28–14

Fourth quarter

- (06:03) OHIO – Parker Navarro 4-yard run (David Dellenbach kick), 7 plays, 55 yards, 3:39; OHIO 35–14
- (07:12) OHIO – Duncan Brune 1-yard run (David Dellenbach kick), 7 plays, 31 yards, 3:56; OHIO 42–14

Statistics	MASS	OHIO
First downs	17	17
Plays–yards	67–215	65–391
Rushes–yards	39–125	57–363
Passing yards	90	28
Passing: Comp–Att–Int	15–28–2	3–8–0
Turnovers	3	1
Time of possession	27:17	32:43

Team	Category	Player	Statistics
UMass	Passing	Grant Jordan	10/21, 56 yards, TD, INT
UMass	Rushing	Brandon Hood	10 carries, 39 yards
UMass	Receiving	Jacquon Gibson	5 receptions, 21 yards
Ohio	Passing	Parker Navarro	3/8, 28 yards
Ohio	Rushing	Sieh Bangura	27 carries, 196 yards, 2 TD
Ohio	Receiving	Eian Pugh	1 reception, 19 yards

Ohio hosted UMass in the final home game of the season. Massachusetts was in its first season in its return to the MAC. They entered 0–10 and on a 14 game losing steak which dates back to a win over FCS Wagner last season. They had not beaten an FBS team since 2023. They were ranked 136th and last in the vast majority of FBS rankings. The Minutemen were coming off of a loss to 45–3 loss to Northern Illinois. Ohio was unbeaten in four prior matchups versus UMass dating back to 2012. The Bobcats won the last matchup in a 58–50 shootout in 2017.

After weather delayed the start, UMass started the game with possession and drove 7 plays for 75 yards culminating with a 10-yard touchdown pass from quarterback Brandon Rose to Owen Anderson. Ohio responded with a sustained 11-play drive, using 6:00 minutes of game time, and ending with a 2-yard rushing touchdown by running back Parker Navarro. UMass drive to the Bobcat 35 and faced a 4th and 1. Puis Odjugo forced and recovered a fumble in the backfield and halted the drive to set Ohio up with good field position. However, the Bobcat offense stalled, and Navarro was stopped on a fourth-and-three play at the UMass 31 leaving the score tied at 7 early in the second quarter.

Ohio's defense forced a three-and-out aided by an Anas Luqman sack. Ohio took over at the UMass 30-yard line. They sustained a drive primarily through their rushing game, including a 29-yard run by Duncan Brune. Brune finished the drive with a 13-yard touchdown run, where he hurdled a defender into the end zone. The Minutemen's ensuing drive was short-lived. Quarterback Brandon Rose threw an interception to Ohio linebacker Jack Fries, who read the play and again gave the Bobcats favorable field position. Ohio ran the ball effectively again, with Sieh Bangura getting them inside the five-yard line. The game then went into a lightning delay. After play resumed, Bangura scored a three-yard touchdown on the first play back from the delay. UMass reached the Bobcat 37 but could not convert a 55-yard field goal. Ohio's next drive ended in a turnover on downs as they failed to convert on fourth down in their own territory and 0:29 remaining in the half. A sack by Charlie Christopher, an incompletion, and a short run made it 4th and 15. DJ Walker intercepted the 4th down attempt as time expired but was negated by a roughing the passer call. UMass missed a 47-yard field goal on an untimed down to end the half.

Due to the weather delays the teams did not go into the locker room for halftime. The Bobcats received the kickoff up 21–7 but could not put away the Minutemen. On the third play, Navarro's 22-yard run ended with a lost fumble forced by Marques White and recovered by Shymell Davis. UMass capitalized, holding the ball for 10 plays, and finished when Grant Jordan, playing for an injured Rose, avoided pressure and connected with Elijah Pedro for a 9-yard touchdown pass to cut the deficit to 21–14. The Bobcats responded with a 10-play, 73-yard drive spanning 4 minutes and 59 seconds. Bangura had runs of 25 and 24 yards on the drive and capped it off with a 2-yard rushing touchdown on fourth down to extend Ohio's lead back to 14 points. UMass's three-and-out was followed by a quick punt by Ohio.

UMass tried to stay in the game with the longest possession of the game early in the fourth quarter. On the 14th play. On a 4th and 6 at the Bobcat 36, Jordan was sacked by Derek Reagans. Ohio then finally took command when Navarro scored on a 4-yard rushing touchdown with 6:46 remaining in the quarter to complete the ensuing drive. Two plays later, Jordan threw an interception to Ohio's Tank Pearson, effectively sealing the game. Ohio ate 3:56 of the remaining time, and scored on a 4th down, 1-yard burst by Brune. After another, UMass three-and-out, the Bobcats took a knee to run out the clock. The victory kept hope alive for a repeat MAC championship for the Bobcats. However, they remained in need of help to make the MAC Championship game. It extended Ohio's school record home winning streak to 13. The Bobcat's have won 23 of 24 home games since the start of the 2022 season. Massachusetts remained as the only winless FBS team.

In the bad weather, Ohio focused heavily on the run, throwing only eight passes the entire game and netting 363 yards on the ground. Navarro was held to 28 passing yards as Ohio outgained Massachusetts 391 to 215. UMass quarterbacks combined for 15 completions on 28 attempts, throwing for 90 yards, two touchdowns, but also two interceptions. Ohio rushed the ball 57 times. Bangura led all players with a career-high 196 rushing yards and two touchdowns. He won MAC Co-Offensive Player of the Week for the effort and went over 1000 rushing yards on the season and 3000 for his career. Other Ohio rushers included Brune with 84 yards and two touchdowns and Navarro with 81 yards and two touchdowns. Chase Hendricks, the MAC's leading receiver, was held without a catch and no Bobcat had more than one reception. Jack Fries led Ohio with 10 tackles and recorded an interception. Tyler Martin led all players with 13 tackles for the Minutemen.

=== at Buffalo ===
Ohio Bobcats (7–4) at Buffalo Bulls (5–6) – Game summary

Quarter	1	2	3	4	Total
Bobcats	7	14	7	3	31
Bulls	0	7	6	13	26

at University at Buffalo Stadium • Amherst, NY

- Date: November 28
- Game time: 12:00 p.m. EST
- Game weather: Cloudy, Temperature:32 °F (0 °C), Wind: W 17 mph (27 km/h)
- Game attendance: 11,096
- Referee: William Williams (MAC)
- TV announcers (ESPNU): Shawn Kenney (play-by-play) and Ryan Cavanaugh (analyst)
- Ohio notes, Buffalo notes • boxscore

Game information

First quarter

- (08:02) OHIO – Mason Williams 11-yard pass from Parker Navarro (David Dellenbach kick), 7 plays, 52 yards, 3:47; OHIO 7–0

Second quarter

- (12:16) BUFF – Chance Morrow 10-yard pass from Ta'Quan Roberson (Jack Howes kick), 2 plays, 11 yards, 0:39; Tied 7–7
- (10:01) OHIO – Sieh Bangura 1-yard run (David Dellenbach kick), 6 plays, 64 yards, 2:09; OHIO 14–7
- (03:43) OHIO – Chase Hendricks 15-yard pass from Parker Navarro (David Dellenbach kick), 10 plays, 86 yards, 5:18; OHIO 21–7

Third quarter

- (12:39) BUFF – Al-Jay Henderson 23-yard run (pass failed), 6 plays, 64 yards, 2:09; OHIO 21–13
- (08:25) OHIO – Parker Navarro 6-yard run (David Dellenbach kick), 9 plays, 61 yards, 4:08; OHIO 28–13

Fourth quarter

- (14:07) BUFF – Ta'Quan Roberson 5-yard run (pass failed), 6 plays, 80 yards, 0:53; OHIO 28–19
- (05:24) OHIO – David Dellenbach 33-yard field goal, 7 plays, 17 yards, 1:46; OHIO 31–19
- (03:47) BUFF – Jasaiah Gathings 29-yard pass from Ta'Quan Roberson (Jack Howes kick), 5 plays, 67 yards, 1:37; OHIO 31–26

Statistics	OHIO	BUFF
First downs	27	19
Plays–yards	77–506	60–370
Rushes–yards	54–359	32–100
Passing yards	147	270
Passing: Comp–Att–Int	10–23–1	16–28–1
Turnovers	3	1
Time of possession	38:04	21:56

Team	Category	Player	Statistics
Ohio	Passing	Parker Navarro	10/23, 147 yards, 2 TD, INT
Ohio	Rushing	Parker Navarro	18 carries, 134 yards, TD
Ohio	Receiving	Chase Hendricks	5 reception, 92 yards, TD
Buffalo	Passing	Ta'Quan Roberson	16/27, 270 yards, 2 TD, INT
Buffalo	Rushing	Terrance Shelton, Jr.	14 carries, 57 yards
Buffalo	Receiving	Nik McMillian	5 reception, 122 yards

The Bobcats traveled to Buffalo, NY for the regular season finale against the Buffalo Bulls. Buffalo entered the game at 5–6 on the season and 4–3 within the conference. Their 37–20 loss at home to Miami the prior week eliminated the Bulls from any chance at a MAC Championship and they were in need of a win to achieve bowl eligibility. Ohio's hopes were alive but they were in need of significant help in needing both Miami and Toledo to lose on Saturday. Both won the following day and Miami advanced to play Western Michigan in Detroit. Ohio led the all-time series 19–11. The Bobcats had won the last 3. The last matchup was a 47–16 win over the Bulls last season. However, the Bobcats were only 3–8 in away games versus Buffalo since the Bulls joined the MAC in 1999.

The Bobcats started with the ball and quickly moved the ball past midfield. However, the possession ended when quarterback Parker Navarro fumbled the ball, and Buffalo's Jalen McNair recovered it at the Buffalo 46-yard line. Taking over in good field position, the Bulls' offense could not capitalize on the turnover. The Ohio defense limited Buffalo to a turnover on downs when the Bulls failed to convert on a 4th and 2. Ohio started at their own 48-yard line after the defensive stop. Sieh Bangura rushed the ball on four straight plays to begin the drive to move deep into Buffalo territory. The drive culminated in an 11-yard touchdown pass from Parker Navarro to tight end Mason Williams on the seventh play, to give the Bobcats a 7–0 lead with 8:02 remaining in the first quarter. The Bulls got just past mid-field on the following possession but were forced to punt. The Buffalo defense forced an Ohio punt shortly thereafter.

Another Buffalo punt set Ohio up at their own 7-yard line early in the second quarter. On third down, Parker Navarro threw an interception that was caught by Kobi Blackwell, setting the Bulls up at the Ohio 11-yard line. Buffalo capitalized this turnover. On their second play of the drive, quarterback Ta'Quan Roberson found Chance Morrow for a 10-yard touchdown pass to tie the game at 7–7 with 12:16 remaining in the half. On the ensuing drive, Ohio faced a 4th and 4 at their own 42 and came out in punt formation. Upback Jack Bruno took the snap on a fake punt and ran through the Buffalo defense for a 48-yard gain. Sieh Bangura finished the drive with a one-yard rushing touchdown a few plays later. Ohio took possession again after a Buffalo three-and-out. Ohio embarked on a 10-play, 86-yard drive that consumed over five minutes of game clock. The drive ended when Navarro connected with Chase Hendricks for a 15-yard touchdown pass. The Bulls got just past midfield on the ensuing drive but a false start penalty and sack by Jay Crable halted the drive. After Buffalo's punt, a 41-yard reception by Hendricks and a 13-yard catch by Caleb Gossett gave Ohio a chance for points before the half. After a sack by Red Murdock on a first down, Bangura fumbled on second down on a 24-yard rush, recovered by Oliver Bridges, to set up the Bulls at their own 3 and the half ran out after two Buffalo rushes.

Buffalo wasted little time getting back in the game at the start of the second half. They put together a 6-play, 86-yard drive highlighted by a 23-yard touchdown run by Al-Jay Henderson at the 12:39 mark of the third quarter. A two-point conversion attempt failed. Ohio responded to Buffalo's score. The Bobcats marched 61 yards in 9 plays. Navarro capped the drive with a 6-yard rushing touchdown on a third and goal to go up 28–13. After a Buffalo three-and-out, Ohio reached the Buffalo 17 but a 35-yard field goal attempt by David Dellenbach failed late in quarter.

On the next play, Ta'Quan Roberson connected with his receiver for a significant 56-yard gain that put the Bulls deep in Ohio territory. He stepped out-of-bounds at the Ohio 22-yaed line for no apparent reason while behind the Bobcat defense. A few plays later, a 5-yard rushing touchdown by Roberson early in the final period kept the Bulls in the game. Another failed two-point try left them still down by nine points. The Bobcats responded with a conservative drive to take 5:35 off of the clock. On a 4th and 15 at the Buffalo 39, a Magnus Haines punt pinned the Bulls at their own 1-yard line. Kendall Bannister intercepted a pass on the 4th play and returned it to the 17-yard line. A penalty forced the Bobcats back to the 32 and they could only manage a 32-yard Dellenbach field goal to go ahead by 12 with 5:34 remaining. Roberson connected on a 29-yard touchdown pass to Jesaiah Gathings on the 5th play of the ensuing drive to keep hope alive for Buffalo. Ohio kept ball on the ground and, after one first down, punted the ball back to the Bulls with 0:20 remaining with the Bulls on their own 12. The clock expired five plays later.

Ohio accumulated 506 total yards compared to Buffalo's 370. Ohio had 359 rushing yards, going over 350 for the second straight game, to just 147 passing yards, while Buffalo managed only 100 rushing yards but 270 passing yards. Ohio controlled the ball for 38:04. Navarro led the Ohio with 268 yards of total offense, including 147 passing yards with two touchdowns and one interception and a team-leading 121 rushing yards with one touchdown. Bangura had another good rushing game with 120 yards. Ohio got Hendricks back into the offense, catching a touchdown and tallying 92 receiving yards. Ta'Quan Roberson threw for 270 yards and two touchdowns with a rushing touchdown. Nik McMillan became the first wide receiver in program history to record six straight 100-yard receiving games, catching five passes for 122 yards for Buffalo. Red Murdock led the Bulls' defense with 14 tackles and a sack.

=== vs. UNLV (Frisco Bowl) ===
2025 Scooter's Coffee Frisco Bowl
UNLV Rebels (10–3) vs. Ohio Bobcats (8–4) – Game summary

Quarter	1	2	3	4	Total
UNLV	0	0	3	7	10
Ohio	0	6	8	3	17

at Ford Center at The Star • Frisco, TX

- Date: December 23
- Game time: 9:00 p.m. EST
- Game weather: None (played indoors)
- Game attendance: 6,521
- Referee: Tim Rich (American)
- TV announcers (ESPN): Wes Durham (play-by-play), Steve Addazio (analyst), and Dana Boyle (sideline)
- Ohio notes, UNLV notes • boxscore

Game information

First quarter

- No scoring plays.

Second quarter

- (10:02) OHIO – Parker Navarro 5-yard run (kick failed), 10 plays, 8 yards, 5:57; OHIO 6–10

Third quarter

- (11:04) OHIO – Sieh Bangura 23-yard run (Parker Navarro Pass to Chase Hendricks), 9 plays, 75 yards, 3:56; OHIO 14–0
- (07:33) UNLV – Ramon Villela 50-yard field goal, 4 plays, −2 yards, 0:57; OHIO 14–3

Fourth quarter

- (10:49) OHIO – David Dellenbach 45-yard field goal, 14 plays, 68 yards, 7:47; OHIO 17–3
- (04:45) UNLV – Anthony Colandrea 2-yard run (Ramon Villela kick), 4 plays, −2 yards, 0:57; OHIO 17–10

Statistics	UNLV	OHIO
First downs	18	19
Plays–yards	59–281	58–350
Rushes–yards	29–97	43–207
Passing yards	184	143
Passing: Comp–Att–Int	19–30–1	11–15–1
Turnovers	2	3
Time of possession	28:00	32:00

Team	Category	Player	Statistics
UNLV	Passing	Anthony Colandrea	19/30, 184 yards, INT, 108.2 rating
UNLV	Rushing	Jai'Den Thomas	11 carries, 51 yards
UNLV	Receiving	Jaden Bradley	4 receptions, 62 yards
Ohio	Passing	Parker Navarro	11/15, 143 yards, INT, 140.1 rating
Ohio	Rushing	Sieh Bangura	19 carries, 149 yards, TD
Ohio	Receiving	Chase Hendricks	4 receptions, 87 yards

Ohio's bowl matchup was UNLV in the 2025 Frisco Bowl. The Rebels entered the game 10–3 on the season. With a 6–2 record in-conference, they finished in a four-way tie for first place in the Mountain West Conference. A tiebreaker involving computer rankings pitted them against Boise State in the championship game. They lost the game to the Broncos for the third straight season. This was just the second meeting between the two schools. UNLV won the first matchup in 1988.

Ohio's defense forced a punt on the Rebel opening drive. The punt was blocked by Miles Cremascoli, giving the Bobcats good field position at their own 47. After a 27-yard Sieh Bangura rush put the Bobcats in field goal range, Navarro was intercepted on the 2nd play by Laterrance Welch at the 3-yard line. The Rebels' offense moved the ball into the Ohio red zone, reaching the 9-yard line. However, the drive ended when Ohio's Ike Ackerman forced a fumble by quarterback Anthony Colandrea and recovered the ball on the Ohio 18-yard line. The Rebels' offense moved the ball into the Ohio red zone, reaching the 9-yard line. However, the drive ended when Ohio's Ike Ackerman strip sacked Anthony Colandrea and recovered the ball on the Ohio 18-yard line. Ohio reached the UNLV 24 after six straight rushes. A bad snap exchange on the next play was recovered by UNLV's Marsel McDuffie. Ohio's defense was eventually able to force a punt and set up their offense at their own 16 near the end of the first quarter.

The Bobcats opened the scoring when quarterback Parker Navarro scored on a 5-yard keeper run with 10:02 left in second the quarter. The extra-point attempt by David Dellenbach hit the right upright and was no good, leaving the score at 6–0. The scoring drive covered 84 yards in 10 plays and consumed 5:57 of game clock. UNLV moved the ball into Ohio territory, reaching the Bobcats 43-yard line, on the ensuing drive. However, the drive stalled there, and a fourth-and-five pass attempt fell incomplete, resulting in a turnover on downs. An Ohio three-and-out set the Rebels up at their own 20. The Rebels maneuvered all the way to the Ohio 33-yard line. With 32 seconds left, Ohio's defense again found a way to keep UNLV scoreless. Colandrea threw a pass into the end zone that was intercepted by Ohio safety DJ Walker. The Bobcats ran out the clock to take a 6–0 lead into halftime.

Ohio received the second-half kickoff and executed a nine-play, 75-yard scoring drive. The drive was a balanced attack of rushing and passing. Bangura capped the possession with a 23-yard touchdown run. Ohio went for a two-point conversion, which was successful on a pass from Navarro to Chase Hendricks, extending the Bobcats' lead to 14–0. Ohio's defense forced a quick punt but a JT Haskins muff recovered by Kayden McGee gave right back to UNLV at the Ohio 30. Bobcats' defense again stiffened and held the Rebels to a Ramon Villela career-long and Frisco Bowl record 50-yard field goal to finally get UNLV on the scoreboard. Following the UNLV field goal, the two teams traded three-and-outs.

Ohio then started a long 14-play drive that would consume the remainder of the third quarter and extend into the fourth. This drive was characterized by with more of run game. The Bobcats moved the ball deep into UNLV territory, eventually setting up a career-long 45-yard field goal by David Dellenbach early in the fourth quarter to push the lead to 17–3 with 10:49 remaining. The ensuing UNLV drive lasted nearly six minutes. It was a 12-play, 79-yard possession that culminated in their first touchdown of the game. On third-and-goal from the one-yard line when a UNLV tight end and running back collided in a self-sabotage play, resulting in a loss of a yard. However, they scored on the very next play when Colandrea scored on a two-yard run with 4:45 left on the clock, bringing the score to 17–10. The Bobcats took over and executed a 10-play drive that included several first down runs by Bangura. Ohio never gave the ball back to UNLV.

UNLV's streak of scoring at least 20 points in 34 consecutive regular-season games, which was the longest active streak in FBS, was snapped. Ohio outgained UNLV 350 yards to 281. The key difference was the rushing game, where Ohio amassed 207 yards on 43 carries, compared to UNLV's 97 yards on 29 carries. The game was a low-scoring defensive battle, as both teams struggled with turnovers three combined in the first quarter and Ohio committed three turnovers overall. Bangura was the Offensive Player of the Game, rushing for 149 yards and one touchdown on 19 carries. Navarro added 43 rushing yards and another touchdown while completing 11 of 15 passes for 143 yards with one interception. Hendricks led the receiving corps with 4 receptions for 87 yards. Defensive Player of the Game Adonis Williams Jr. led Ohio with five total tackles, including a sack. Colandrea, the Mountain West Conference Player of the Year, completed 19 of 30 passes for 184 yards and one interception. He also scored a late rushing touchdown. Jai'Chaun Thomas was UNLV's leading rusher with 51 yards on 11 carries. Jacob Bradley led the Rebels with 4 receptions for 62 yards. McDuffie led all defenders with nine tackles and recovered a Bobcat fumble.

Ohio extended its bowl winning streak to seven games. With forty wins, Ohio set a program record for wins over a four-year stretch. This was the first coaching victory for interim head coach John Hauser. He was named the full-time coach three days later.

== Statistics ==
Final Statistics through December 23, 2025

=== Team ===
	Ohio	Opp
Scoring	361	285
Points per game	27.77	21.92
First downs	281	240
Rushing	144	109
Passing	117	115
Penalty	20	16
Rushing yards	2956	1872
Avg per play	5.3	4.4
Avg per game	227.4	144.0
Rushing touchdowns	32	15
Passing yards	2394	2705
Att-Comp-Int	312–192–11	360–231–12
Avg per pass	7.67	7.51
Avg per catch	12.47	11.71
Avg per game	184.15	208.08
Passing touchdowns	14	19
Total offense	5350	4577
Avg per play	6.1	5.8
Avg per game	411.5	352.1
Fumbles-Lost	16–8	10–5
Penalties-Yards	80–628	58–504
Avg per game	48.31	38.76

	Ohio	Opp
Punts-Yards	43-1748	55–2285
Net Avg per Punt	36.07	37.18
Time of possession/Game	32:07	27:41
3rd down conversions	70–165	54–162
4th down conversions	17–29	17–29
Touchdowns scored	55	32
Field goals-Attempts	7–12	13–19
PAT-Attempts	42–47	30–30
Attendance		
Games/Avg per Game		
Neutral Site		

=== Individual leaders ===
==== Passing ====
Passing statistics
#	Name	GP	GS	Record	Rtg	Cmp	Att	Int	Pct	Yds	TD	Lng	Y/A	Y/G
13	Parker Navarro	13	13	9–4	135.87	188	303	11	62.05	2375	14	67	7.84	182.69
8	Nick Poulos	4	0	0–0	69.95	4	8	0	50.00	19	0	6	2.37	4.75
	Team	13	0	0–0	0.00	0	1	0	0.00	0	0	0	0.00	0.00
Totals		13	13	9–4	133.75	192	312	11	61.54	2394	14	67	7.67	184.15
Opponents		13	13	4–9	138.03	231	360	12	64.17	2705	19	71	7.51	208.08

==== Rushing ====
Rushing statistics
#	NAME	GP	ATT	GAIN	AVG	TD	LONG	AVG/G
5	Sieh Bangura	13	241	1392	5.8	15	49	107.08
13	Parker Navarro	3	160	886	5.5	9	44	68.15
6	Duncan Brune	13	120	589	4.9	8	66	45.00
86	Jake Bruno	13	1	48	48.0	0	48	3.69
21	Doe Boyland	12	8	45	5.6	0	12	3.75
8	Nick Poulos	4	8	34	4.3	0	19	8.50
7	Chase Hendricks	13	1	1	1.0	0	1	0.08
51	Davion Weatherspoon	13	0	0	0.0	0	0	0.00
	Team	13	19	−35	−1.8	0	0	−2.69
Totals		13	538	2956	5.3	32	66	227.38
Opponents		13	429	1872	4.4	15	64	144.00

==== Receiving ====
Receiving statistics
#	NAME	GP	CTH	YDS	AVG	TD	LONG	AVG/G
7	Chase Hendricks	13	71	1037	14.61	7	67	79.77
11	Rodney Harris II	13	30	419	13.97	2	49	32.23
85	Mason Williams	13	26	276	10.62	3	30	21.23
88	Caleb Gossett	13	12	162	13.50	0	35	12.46
19	Dom Dorwart	13	11	119	10.82	0	35	9.15
86	Jake Bruno	13	9	87	9.67	2	16	6.69
3	Max Rodarte	4	7	86	12.29	0	24	21.50
5	Sieh Bangura	13	13	77	5.92	0	11	5.92
12	Eian Pugh	5	6	75	12.50	0	25	15.00
6	Duncan Brune	13	5	57	11.40	0	32	4.38
0	Delaney Crawford	5	0	0	0.00	0	0	0.00
59	Nick Marinaro	13	1	−4	−4.00	0	0	−0.31
Totals		13	192	2394	12.47	14	67	184.15
Opponents		13	231	2705	11.71	19	71	208.08

==== Defense ====
Defense statistics
#	NAME	GP	SOLO	AST	TOT	TFL-YDS	SACK-YDS	INT	BU	QBH	FR	FF	BLK	SAF	TD
22	Jalen Thomeson	13	42	44	86	7.0–13	0–0	1	1	2	1	1	0	0	
5	Adonis Williams Jr.	13	58	22	80	4.0–12	1.0–4	0	1	1	0	0	0	0	
25	Charlie Christopher	13	32	31	63	3.0–12	1.5–9	0	2	2	1	1	0	0	
30	Michael Molnar	8	24	38	62	5.0–14	1.5–9	0	3	2	0	0	0	0	
2	DJ Walker	13	37	24	61	6.0–10	0–0	2	1	1	0	0	0	0	
7	Jack Fries	8	25	29	54	3.0–5	0.5–2	1	5	1	0	0	0	0	
27	Tank Pearson	12	40	13	53	0–0	0–0	2	11	0	0	0	0	0	
24	Cameron Hollobaugh	11	21	24	45	3.0–16	1.0–13	2	1	3	0	1	0	0	
15	Michael Mack II	10	22	14	36	1.0–1	0–0	2	1	0	0	0	0	0	
12	Anas Luqman	13	14	20	34	9.0–45	4.0–29	0	2	6	0	0	0	0	
9	Jay Crable	13	16	17	33	8.0–54	6.0–49	0	4	5	1	0	0	0	
44	Nehemiah Dukes	13	7	23	30	2.0–5	1.0–3	0	3	1	0	0	0	0	
10	Pius Odjugo	10	12	13	25	2.5–6	0–0	0	0	5	1	1	0	0	
57	Nathan Hale	13	8	9	17	1.0–2	0–0	0	0	4	0	0	0	0	
11	Evan Herrmann	13	8	7	15	2.0–7	1.0–4	0	0	6	0	0	0	0	
97	Makel Williams	12	7	5	12	0–0	0–0	0	0	1	0	0	0	0	
0	Austin Mitchell	12	3	8	11	0.5–2	0–0	1	0	1	0	0	0	0	
3	Kendall Bannister	10	8	2	10	0–0	0–0	1	2	0	0	0	0	0	
37	Pierre Kemeni Jr.	12	4	5	9	0–0	0–0	0	0	0	0	0	0	0	
16	Blake Guffey	13	4	4	8	0–0	0–0	0	0	0	0	0	0	0	
98	Joseph Marsh	12	4	4	8	2.0–8	2.0–8	0	0	0	0	0	0	0	
20	Derek Reagans	13	4	4	8	2.0–12	1.5–11	0	0	3	0	0	0	0	
99	JT Haskins	13	3	3	6	0–0	0–0	0	0	0	0	0	0	0	
29	Ty Neubert	6	0	6	6	0–0	0–0	0	0	0	0	0	0	0	
4	Ike Ackerman	4	3	2	5	2.0–11	1.0–9	0	0	0	1	1	0	0	
32	Rickey Hyatt Jr.	11	1	4	5	0–0	0–0	0	1	0	0	0	0	0	
4	Jasen Kelly	12	2	3	5	0–0	0–0	0	0	0	0	0	0	0	
6	Kaci Seegars	2	1	4	5	1.0–3	0–0	0	0	0	0	0	0	0	
39	Duncan Brune	13	3	1	4	0–0	0–0	0	0	0	0	0	0	0	
8	David Dellenbach	13	1	3	4	0–0	0–0	0	0	0	0	0	0	0	
31	Jaymar Mundy	5	1	3	4	0–0	0–0	0	0	0	0	0	0	0	
10	Khamani Debrow	7	2	1	3	0–0	0–0	0	0	0	0	0	0	0	
50	Eamonn Dennis	8	2	1	3	0–0	0–0	0	0	0	0	0	0	0	
21	Owen DiFranco	1	0	2	2	0–0	0–0	0	0	0	0	0	0	0	
13	Ronald Jackson Jr.	2	1	1	2	0–0	0–0	0	0	0	0	0	0	0	
40	Parker Navarro	13	0	2	2	0–0	0–0	0	0	0	0	0	0	0	
3	Nate Riegle	11	1	1	2	0–0	0–0	0	0	2	0	0	0	0	
18	Max Rodarte	4	1	1	2	0–0	0–0	0	0	0	0	0	0	0	
5	Andrew Vera	3	1	1	2	0–0	0–0	0	0	0	0	0	0	0	
18	Sieh Bangura	13	1	0	1	0–0	0–0	0	0	0	0	0	0	0	
19	Miles Cremascoli	11	1	0	1	0–0	0–0	0	0	0	0	0	1	0	
11	Dom Dorwart	13	0	1	1	0–0	0–0	0	0	0	0	0	0	0	
46	Rodney Harris II	13	0	1	1	0–0	0–0	0	0	0	0	0	0	0	
26	Nick Hemer	13	0	1	1	0–0	0–0	0	0	0	0	0	0	0	
59	Tyson Long	3	0	1	1	0–0	0–0	0	0	0	0	0	0	0	
85	Nick Marinaro	13	1	0	1	0–0	0–0	0	0	0	0	0	0	0	
86	DJ Morton	12	1	0	1	0–0	0–0	0	0	0	0	1	0	0	
7	Mason Williams	13	0	1	1	0–0	0–0	0	0	0	0	0	0	0	
43	Jake Bruno	13	0	0	0	0–0	0–0	0	0	0	0	0	0	0	
	Chase Hendricks	13	0	0	0	0–0	0–0	0	0	0	0	0	0	0	
	Brack Peacock	6	0	0	0	0–0	0–0	0	0	0	0	0	0	0	
	Team	13	0	0	0	0–0	0–0	0	0	0	0	0	0	0	
Total		13	427	404	831	64–238	22–140	12	38	46	5	6	1	0	
Opponents		13	412	546	958	49–187	49–187	11	34	41	6	8	1	1	

Key: POS: Position, SOLO: Solo Tackles, AST: Assisted Tackles, TOT: Total Tackles, TFL: Tackles-for-loss, SACK: Quarterback Sacks, INT: Interceptions, BU: Passes Broken Up, PD: Passes Defended, QBH: Quarterback Hits, FR: Fumbles Recovered, FF: Forced Fumbles, BLK: Kicks or Punts Blocked, SAF: Safeties, TD : Touchdown

==== Special teams ====
Kicking statistics
#	NAME	XPM	XPA	XP%	FGM	FGA	FG%	1–19	20–29	30–39	40–49	50+	LNG
39	David Dellenbach	26	28	92.9%	4	6	66.7%	0/0	0/0	3/4	1/2	0/0	45
43	Brack Peacock	16	18	88.9%	3	6	60.0%	0/0	0/0	2/5	1/1	0/0	44
Totals		42	47	89.4%	6	11	54.6%	0/0	0/0	5/9	2/3	0/0	45
Opponents		30	30	100.0%	12	18	66.7%	0/0	7/8	3/4	2/4	1/3	50

Kickoff statistics
#	NAME	GP	KICKS	YDS	AVG	TB	OB
39	David Dellenbach	13	70	4162	59.5	15	4
Totals		13	70	4162	59.5	15	4
Opponents		13	59	3442	58.3	29	4

Punting statistics
#	NAME	GP	PUNTS	YDS	AVG	LONG	TB	FC	I–20	50+	BLK
42	Magnus Haines	13	40	1693	42.33	68	3	15	13	6	0
39	David Dellenbach	13	1	21	21.0	21	0	0	1	0	0
13	Parker Navarro	13	1	34	34.0	34	1	0	0	0	0
	Team	1	0	0	0.0	0	0	0	0	0	1
Totals		13	42	1748	40.65	68	4	15	14	6	1
Opponents		13	55	2285	41.55	62	4	16	15	11	1

Punt return statistics
#	NAME	RET	YDS	AVG	TD	LONG
7	Chase Hendricks	8	143	17.88	0	52
3	Max Rodarte	3	19	6.33	0	18
29	JT Haskins	1	−2	−2.00	0	18
Totals		12	160	13.33	0	52
Opponents		13	117	9.00	1	32

Kickoff return statistics
#	NAME	RET	YDS	AVG	TD	LONG
10	Eamonn Dennis	9	182	20.22	0	58
5	Sieh Bangura	3	141	47.00	1	97
6	Duncan Brune	2	37	18.50	0	20
85	Mason WIlliams	2	23	11.50	0	13
23	Alfred Jordan Jr.	1	15	15.00	0	15
Totals		17	398	23.41	1	97
Opponents		30	671	22.37	0	67

== Personnel ==
=== Coaching staff ===
Since December 18, 2024, the head coach of the Ohio Bobcats has been Brian Smith. He heads a staff of eleven assistant coaches, four graduate assistants, a director of football operations, and numerous other support staff.

Name	Position	Years at Ohio	Alma mater
Brian Smith	Head coach	2022	University of Hawaii 2002
John Hauser	Associate Head Coach / Defensive Coordinator	2022	Wittenberg University 2002
Scott Isphording	Offensive Coordinator/Quarterbacks	2014	Hanover College 1994
Blair Cavanaugh	Special Teams Coordinator/Running Backs Coach	2025	Portland State University 2016
DeAngelo Smith	Defensive Passing Game Coordinator/Cornerbacks Coach/Director of Player Development	2017	University of Cincinnati 2008
Tremayne Scott	Running Game Coordinator/Defensive tackles	2018	Ohio University 2012
Jeff Phelps	Pass Rush Specialist/Defensive Ends Coach	2025	Ball State University 1999
Chris Woods	Linebackers	2025	Davidson College 1990
Tavita Thompson	Offensive Line Coach	2025	Oregon State University 2008
Andre Allen	Wide receivers	2023	Ashford
Kyle Obly	Tight Ends	2025	Ohio University 2022
Joe Tresey	Director of High School Relations	2024	Ohio State University 1982
Jeremiah Covington	Assistant athletic director for football operations	2022	Wingate University 2011
Reagan Fornshell	Graduate assistant – offense		
Brandon Pahl	Graduate assistant – offense		
Garret Pruss	Graduate assistant – defense		
Nick Auriemma	Graduate assistant – defense		

=== Support staff ===
Name	Position	Years at Ohio	Alma mater
Sarah Newgarde	Director of athletics administration and football communications	2021	Ohio University
Logan Meyer	general manager	2025	University of Cincinnati
Jerry Lin	Staff Athletic trainer (football, swim & dive)	2022	University of South Carolina
Caleb Moon	Assistant director of equipment services		
Thomas Turnbaugh	Director of video and recruiting services	2018	Ohio University
Elaine Goodfellow	Administrative assistant		
Jessica Arquette	Ohio athletics sports dietitian		Bowling Green State University
Joseph Benish	Staff Athletic Trainer (Football/Track)	2023	Penn State University
Tyler Shumate	Director of Strength and Conditioning	2024	University of Virginia
Noah Spielman	Associate Director of Football Strength and Conditioning	2025	
Chalon Jackson	Football Strength and Conditioning – Graduate Assistant	2025	
Theodus Riggold	Football Strength and Conditioning – Graduate Assistant	2025	
John Bowman	Director of Sports Medicine & Athletics Health Care Administrator	1994	Ohio University
Dr. Sergio Ulloa	Team Orthopedic Physician		Ohio University
Dr. Katherine Guran	Head Team Physician		Northeast Ohio Medical University
James Odenthal	Staff Physical Therapist	2016	Ohio University

=== Roster ===
2025 Ohio Bobcats football roster

Quarterback

- 4 Jacob Winters – R-So. 6′2″ (224 lb.) Jackson, Ohio / Jackson
- 8 Nick Poulos – R-Sr. 6′6″ (243 lb.) Granite Bay, Calif. / Granite Bay / / El Camino College
- 9 Hype Grand – Fr. 6′0″ (185 lb.) La Puente, Calif. / Pasadena HS
- 13 Parker Navarro – Gr. 6′0″ (211 lb.) Tempe, Ariz. / Desert Vista / / UCF
- 14 Tim Carpenter – R-Fr. 6′3″ (235 lb.) Dayton, Ohio / Trotwood-Madison HS / / Tulsa
- 16 Matthew Papas – R–Fr. 5′11″ (192 lb.) Grove City, Ohio / Grove City

Running back

- 5 Sieh Bangura – R-Sr. 6′0″ (216 lb.) Bowie, Md. / Dematha Catholic
- 6 Duncan Brune – So. 5′11″ (218 lb.) Cologne, Germany / Cologne Crocodiles
- 21 Doe Boyland – Gr. 6′0″ (222 lb.) Medina, Ohio / Medina / / Drake
- 22 Mike Taylor Jr. – Fr. 5′10″ (204 lb.) Pickerington, Ohio / Pickerington North
- 24 Irving Brown – Fr. 5′11″ (220 lb.) Teachey, N.C. / Wallace-Rose Hill
- 48 Aginon Wilson Jr. – R-So. 5′10″ (211 lb.) Cleveland, Ohio / Cleveland Heights

Wide receiver

- 0 Delaney Crawford – R-Jr. 6′2″ (202 lb.) Fontana, Calif. / Corona Senior / / Virginia
- 2 Khamani Debrow – R-So. 6′3″ (206 lb.) Killeen, Texas / Ellison
- 3 Max Rodarte – R–Sr. 6′0″ (192 lb.) Sacramento, Calif. / Capital Christian / / City College of San Francisco
- 7 Chase Hendricks – Jr. 6′0″ (203 lb.) St. Louis, Mo. / St. Mary's
- 10 Eamonn Dennis – Gr. 5′11″ (193 lb.) Worcester, Mass. / St. John's / / Michigan
- 11 Rodney Harris II – R-Jr. 6′2″ (213 lb.) Cincinnati, Ohio / Princeton (Ohio)
- 12 Eian Pugh – R-Jr. 6′3″ (182 lb.) Oak Park, Ill. / Fenwick / / Illinois
- 15 Riley Neer – R–Fr. 5′11″ (190 lb.) Bellefontaine, Ohio / Bellefontaine
- 17 Kaden Hurst – R–Fr. 6′0″ (201 lb.) Fort Wayne, Indiana / Leo
- 18 Miles Cremascoli – R–Fr. 6′3″ (213 lb.) Winnetka, Ill. / New Trier
- 19 Dom Dorwart – R–Fr. 6′2″ (208 lb.) Leonardtown, Md. / St. Mary's Ryken
- 20 Rashad Perry – Fr. 5′11″ (160 lb.) Fresno, Calif. / Washington Union HS
- 23 Alfred Jordan Jr. – Gr. 5′9″ (178 lb.) St. Louis, Mo. / / / Idaho State
- 37 Blake Guffey – R-Jr. 6′1″ (221 lb.) Glouster, Ohio / Trimble / / Notre Dame College (Ohio)
- 80 Matthew Dragich – Jr. 6′0″ (214 lb.) / Servite HS / Long Beach City College (Calif.)
- 83 Colton Grover – R–Sr. 5′9″ (190 lb.) Phoenix, Ariz. / Desert Vista HS / South Dakota Mikes
- 88 Caleb Gossett – Gr. 6′2″ (206 lb.) Lewis Center, Ohio / Olentangy / Dayton

Tight end

- 44 Aiden Lowery – R–Fr. 6′3″ (238 lb.) Dublin, Ohio / Dublin Jerome
- 82 Nick Segarra – R–Fr. 6′6″ (254 lb.) Charlotte, N.C. / Charlotte Catholic
- 84 AJ Miller – R–Fr. 6′4″ (239 lb.) Pickerington, Ohio / Pickerington North
- 85 Mason Williams – R-So. 6′5″ (258 lb.) Mogadore, Ohio / Mogadore
- 86 Jake Bruno – R-Sr. 6′6″ (261 lb.) Amherst, N.Y. / Saint Francis
- 87 Tim Boals – Fr. 6′4″ (235 lb.) Sandusky, Ohio / Perkins HS

Offensive lineman

- 51 Davion Weatherspoon – Gr. 6′0″ (303 lb.) Harper Woods, Mich. / Harper Woods High School
- 52 Andres Dewerk – Gr. 6′7″ (328 lb.) San Jose, Calif. / Los Gatos HS / / App State / USC
- 55 Jordon Jones – R-Jr. 6′3″ (287 lb.) Ashland, Ky. / Paul G. Blazer
- 56 Ben Maldonado – Sr. 6′4″ (291 lb.) Miami, Fla. / Champagnat Catholic School
- 59 Nick Marinaro – Gr. 6′1″ (291 lb.) Wayzata, Minn. / Benilde-St. Margaret's / / Dartmouth
- 60 Trent Allen – Sr. 6′3″ (286 lb.) Windemere, Fla. / Bishop Moore / / Davenport
- 63 Seth Anstead – R–Fr. 6′4″ (300 lb.) Chelsea, Mich. / Chelsea
- 64 Shedrick Rhodes Jr. – Gr. 6′5″ (299 lb.) McDonough, Ga. / Eagle's Landing Christian Academy
- 65 Josh Waite – Gr. 6′3″ (301 lb.) Roaring Springs, Pa. / Central Martinsburg HS / / Shippensburg
- 67 Kam Wright – R-Jr. 6′4″ (309 lb.) Granville, Ohio / Granville
- 70 Joshua Johnson – Gr. 6′3″ (329 lb.)
- 71 Aidan Johnson – R-So. 6′3″ (308 lb.) Elkridge, Maryland / Good Counsel
- 72 Jakob Lemus – R-Sr. 6′5″ (308 lb.) Oxnard, Calif. / Hueneme / / Ventura College
- 74 Tigana Cisse – Sr. 6′3″ (305 lb.) Oakland, Calif. / McClymonds / / Idaho
- 75 Jarian Shelby – R-Jr. 6′3″ (290 lb.) Luling, La. / Hahnville High School
- 76 Bryce Parson – R–Fr. 6′2″ (296 lb.) Saint Louis, Mo. / Christian Brothers College
- 77 Ibrahim Kebe – Fr. 6′7″ (326 lb.) Cincinnati, Ohio / Lakota East HS
- 79 Angelo DeLucia – Fr. 6′5″ (218 lb.) Canfield, Ohio / Canfield

Placekicker

- 28 Britton Watts – So. 6′1″ (161 lb.) / / / Utah State
- 39 David Dellenbach – R-Fr. 6′2″ (196 lb.) Park City, Utah / Park City HS / / UCLA
- 43 Brack Peacock – R-So. 5′7″ (165 lb.) Granbury, Texas / Granbury / Incarnate Word
- 47 Alex Kasee – Jr. 6′2″ (173 lb.) Sylvania, Ohio / Sylvania Northview

Defensive line

- 4 Kaci Seegars – R-Sr. 6′2″ (248 lb.) Charlotte, N.C. / Audrey Kell / / Liberty
- 10 Pius Odjugo – R–Sr. 6′3″ (280 lb.) Warri, Nigeria/Browntown, Mich. / River Rouge H.S. / / Central Michigan / Garden City C.C. (Kansas) / Highland C.C. (Kansas)
- 11 Evan Herrmann – R–So. 6′5″ (245 lb.) Sussex, Wis. / / / Vanderbilt
- 12 Jay Crable – R-So. 6′3″ (231 lb.) Massillon, Ohio / Archbishop
- 14 Ike Ackerman – Fr. 6′4″ (249 lb.) Omaha, Neb. / Central
- 15 Anas Luqman – R-Jr. 6′4″ (245 lb.) Cincinnati, Ohio / Princeton HS / / Arkansas Pine Bluff
- 16 Joseph Marsh – R-So. 6′3″ (232 lb.) Simi Valley, Calif. / Oaks Christian HS / / Boise State / College of the Canyons
- 44 Nehemiah Dukes – Jr. 6′1″ (288 lb.) Douglasville, Ga. / Alexander HS / / Youngstown State
- 50 Owen DiFranco – R-So. 6′4″ (258 lb.) Glen Ellyn, Ill. / Glenbard South
- 57 Nathan Hale – Sr. 6′4″ (259 lb.) Wichita, Kan. / Northwest / / Iowa Western CC
- 58 Nate Riegle – Sr. 6′3″ (218 lb.) Findlay, Ohio / Findlay / / Ohio State
- 92 RJ Keuchler – R-So. 6′3″ (255 lb.) Pickerington, Ohio / Pickerington Central
- 94 Brandon Weaver – Fr. 6′3″ (269 lb.) Columbus, Ohio / Hilliard Darby
- 95 Walter Bob Jr. – Sr. ( lb.) Lafayette, La. / Acadiana / Hutchinson CC
- 97 Austin Mitchell – R-So. 6′2″ (274 lb.) Avon, Ohio / Avon
- 98 Derek Reagans – Jr. 6′0″ (279 lb.) San Francisco, Calif. / Sacred Heart Cathedral HS / City College of San Francisco
- 99 Ty Neubert – Fr. 6′3″ (278 lb.) Columbus, Ohio / St. Francis De Sales

Linebacker

- 0 Makel Williams – Gr. 6′0″ (220 lb.) Bryan, Texas / A&M Consolidated HS / / Blinn College / Fort Hays State
- 24 Cameron Hollobaugh – Gr. 6′0″ (221 lb.) Warren, Ohio / Warren JFK / / Walsh
- 25 Michael Molnar – R-Jr. 6′3″ (227 lb.) Mason, Ohio / Mason
- 27 Jack Fries – R-Jr. 6′2″ (222 lb.) Cincinnati, Ohio / LaSalle
- 30 Charlie Christopher – Fr. 6′0″ (227 lb.) Uniontown, Ohio / Lake
- 32 Jasen Kelly – R–Fr. 6′1″ (208 lb.) Toledo, Ohio / Whitmer
- 33 Jermaine Minnis – Fr. 6′2″ (204 lb.) Hyattsville, Md. / DeMatha Catholic
- 34 Lukas Stiles – R-So. 5′9″ (216 lb.) Wadsworth, Ohio / Highland
- 45 Brady Wharton – Fr. 5′10″ (193 lb.) Athens, Ohio / Athens HS

Defensive back

- 2 DJ Walker – R-So. 6′1″ (198 lb.) Aliquippa, Pa. / Aliquippa
- 3 Pierre Kemeni Jr. – Gr. 6′2″ (223 lb.) Milton, Ontario, Canada / Clarkson North HS / / New Mexico / Garden City CC / Texas State
- 5 Adonis Williams Jr. – Sr. 6′2″ (221 lb.) Cleveland Heights, Ohio / Cleveland Heights / / Naval Academy Prep School
- 6 Rickey Hyatt Jr. – Gr. 6′0″ (206 lb.) Westerville, Ohio / Westerville Central HS / / South Alabama / Kentucky
- 7 Tank Pearson – Gr. 5′9″ (182 lb.) Oxford, Miss. / Oxford / / Northwest Mississippi Community College
- 8 Jaymar Mundy – R-Sr. 6′1″ (188 lb.) Cincinnati, Ohio / La Salle HS / / Western Kentucky / Hutchinson CC / Miami (Ohio)
- 9 Michael Mack II – Gr. 6′1″ (200 lb.) Glenn Dale, Md. / Bullis School / / Wisconsin / Air Force
- 13 DJ Morton – R–Fr. 6′1″ (191 lb.) Indianapolis, Ind. / Lawrence Central
- 17 Caleb Chamberlin – R-Fr. 6′1″ (199 lb.) Jupiter, Fla. / Palm Beach Gardens HS / / Air Force
- 18 Andrew Vera – Jr. 5′11″ (199 lb.) St. Clairsville, Ohio / St. Clairsville
- 19 Bobby Miller – Fr. 6′4″ (177 lb.) Orlando, Fla. / Bishop Moore HS
- 20 Kendall Bannister – R-So. 5′11″ (187 lb.) Woodbridge, Va. / Freedom
- 21 Ronald Jackson Jr. – Gr. 6′1″ (203 lb.) Detroit, Mich. / Belleville HS / / Montana / Akron
- 22 Jalen Thomeson – Jr. 5′11″ (193 lb.) Greenwood, Ind. / Center Grove
- 23 Tony Mathis – So. 5′11″ (176 lb.) Macon, Ga. / Westside
- 26 Tyson Long – Fr. 6′0″ (184 lb.) Pickerington, Ohio / Pickerington North
- 28 Taliq Black – Fr. 6′0″ (194 lb.)
- 29 JT Haskins – So. 5′11″ (182 lb.) Lexington, Ky. / Bryant Station
- 36 Leroy Bowers – Gr. 6′0″ (206 lb.)
- 41 Creed Hill – R-So. 5′10″ (184 lb.) Medina, Ohio / Highland
- 49 Xavier Williams – R–Fr. 5′10″ (156 lb.) Akron, Ohio / Archbishop Hoban

Punter

- 42 Magnus Haines – Gr. 6′0″ (193 lb.) Massillon, Ohio / Massillon Washington / / Kent State / Arkansas State
- 90 Kolten Bartels – Fr. 5′10″ (195 lb.) Richmond, Mich. / Richmond

Long snapper

- 38 Dominic Konopka – R-Jr. 5′11″ (256 lb.) Sharon Center, Ohio / Highland / / Marshall
- 46 Nick Hemer – R-Jr. 6′4″ (184 lb.) Pittsburgh, Pa. / Seneca Valley HS / / Hutchinson CC / Buffalo

As of August 17, 2025

=== Depth chart ===
Defense

FS
Adonis Williams Jr.
Rickey Hyatt Jr.
–

NICKEL	WILL	MIKE
Jalen Thomeson	Jack Fries	Cameron Hollobaugh
Pierre Kemeni Jr.	Makel Williams	Charlie Christopher
–	Jason Kelly	–

SS
DJ Walker
JT Haskins
–

CB
Michael Mack II
Jaymar Mundy
Kendall Bannister

DE	DT	DT	DE
Anas Luqman	Pius Odjugo	Nehemiah Dukes	Jay Crable
Joseph Marsh	Austin Mitchell	Nathan Hale	Joseph Marsh
–	–	–	–

CB
Tank Pearson
Ronald Jackson Jr
–

Offense

WR-F
Dom Dorwart
Eian Pugh
–

WR-X
Chase Hendricks
Caleb Gossett
–

LT	LG	C	RG	RT
Shedrick Rhodes Jr.	Davion Weatherspoon	Nick Marinaro	Trent Allen	Jordon Jones
Jarian Shelby	Kam Wright	Bryce Parson	Seth Anstead	Tiganna Cisse
–	–	–	–	–

TE
Mason Williams
Jake Bruno
–

WR-Z
Rodney Harris II
Delaney Crawford
–

QB
Parker Navarro
Nick Poulos
–

RB
Sieh Bangura
Duncan Brune
–

Special teams
PK Brack Peacock
David Dellenbach
P Magnus Haines
Kolten Bartels
KR Eamonn Dennis
Alfred Jordan Jr
PR Chase Hendricks
Alfred Jordan Jr.
LS Nick Hemer
Aiden Lowery

Starters out: JACK DE: Kaci Seegars, WILL LB: Michael Molnar, WR-F: Max Rodarte

For November 18, 2025 Game 11 vs. Massachusetts – Source:

=== Coaching staff changes ===
==== Departures ====
Name	Position	New school	New position
Tim Albin	Head coach	Charlotte	Head coach
Nate Faanes	co-defensive coordinator/Special teams coordinator/linebackers	Charlotte	Defensive coordinator/Linebackers
Kurt Mattix	Defensive ends/Pass Rush Specialist	Charlotte	Co-defensive coordinator/Defensive line
Brian Metz	Recruiting Coordinator/Tight ends	Charlotte	Tight ends/Recruiting coordinator
Allen Rudolph	Offensive line	Charlotte	Offensive line/Run game coordinator

==== Additions ====
Name	Position	Previous school	Previous position
Blair Cavanaugh	Special Teams Coordinator/Running Backs	Incarnate Word	Special Teams Coordinator
Jeff Phelps	Pass Rush Specialist/Defensive Ends Coach	Wyoming	Defensive Tackles
Tavita Thompson	Offensive Line Coach	Central Michigan	Run game coordinator/Offensive Line Coach
Kyle Obly	Tight Ends	Ohio	Graduate Assistant
Chris Woods	Linebackers	Arlington Renegades	Linebackers
Joe Tresey	Director of High School Relations	Ohio	Recruiting assistant

==== Internal changes ====
Name	New Position	Previous position
Brian Smith	Head coach	Associate Head Coach/Offensive Coordinator/running backs
John Hauser	Associate Head Coach/Defensive Coordinator/Safeties	Defensive Coordinator/Safeties
Scott Isphording	Offensive coordinator/quarterbacks	Passing game coordinator/quarterbacks

=== Transfers ===
Positions key
Offense	Defense	Special teams
QB — Quarterback; RB — Running back; FB — Fullback; WR — Wide receiver; TE — Tight end; OL — Offensive lineman; T — Tackle; G — Guard; C — Center	DL — Defensive lineman; DT — Defensive tackle (Note: Includes nose tackle (NT)); DE — Defensive end; EDGE — Edge rusher; LB — Linebacker (Note: Includes middle linebacker (MLB/MIKE), weakside linebacker (WILL), strongside linebacker (SAM), off-ball linebacker, and outside linebacker (OLB)); DB — Defensive back; CB — Cornerback; S — Safety (Note: Includes free safety (FS) and strong safety (SS))	K — Kicker (Note: Also known as a placekicker (PK)); P — Punter; LS — Long snapper; RS — Return specialist (Note: Includes kickoff and punt returners)

==== Outgoing ====
Player	Position	Destination
Bradley Weaver	DL	Rutgers
Parker Startz	EDGE	Charlotte
Bryce Butler	TE	Charlotte
Stellan Bowman	LB	Charlotte
Rickey Hunt Jr.	RB	Tulsa
CJ Doggette	DL	Florida Atlantic
Austin Brawley	S	New Mexico
Jacob Dennison	T	Wake Forest
Gianni Spetic	K	Memphis
Reise Collier	LB	
Xander Karagosian	S	
Colby Garfield	LS	Charlotte
Cam Rice	DL	Maryland
Shay Taylor	LB	Charlotte
Kaden Schmitz	DE	Charlotte
Andrew Erby	IOL	Bucknell
Joseph Habinowski	T	Middle Tennessee
Beau Blankenship	TE	Gardner-Webb
Sinn Brennan	EDGE	
Bralen Henderson	DL	Missouri
Matthew Stuewe	WR	
Maverick Ohle	DT	North Central

==== Incoming ====
Player	Position	Transferred from
Nick Hemer	OL	Hutchinson Community College
Anas Luqman	EDGE	Arkansas–Pine Bluff
Rickey Hyatt Jr.	S	South Alabama
Evan Herrmann	EDGE	Vanderbilt
David Dellenbach	K	UCLA
Sieh Bangura	RB	Minnesota
Alfred Jordan Jr.	WR	Idaho State
Jaymar Mundy	CB	Western Kentucky
Pierre Kemeni Jr.	CB	New Mexico
Nehemiah Dukes	DL	Youngstown State
Colton Grover	WR	South Dakota Mines
Josh Waite	ILB	Shippensburg
Ronald Jackson Jr.	S	Old Dominion
Nick Marinaro	IOL	Dartmouth
Andres Dewerk	OL	Appalachian State
Tim Carpenter	QB	Tulsa
Shedrick Rhodes Jr.	T	Rutgers
Makel Williams	LB	Fort Hays State
Caleb Chamberlin	S	Air Force
Joseph Marsh	EDGE	Boise State
Cam Hollobaugh	LB	Walsh
Pius Odjugo	DL	Central Michigan
Derek Reagans	DL	City College of San Francisco
Dorian Boyland	RB	Drake
Magnus Haines	P	Arkansas State
Nate Riegle	DL	Ohio State

=== Recruiting class ===
College recruiting
Name	Hometown	School	Height	Weight	Commit date
Michael Taylor; RB	Pickerington, OH	Pickerington North	5 ft 10 in (1.78 m)	190 lb (86 kg)	Jun 30, 2024
Michael Taylor; RB	Recruit ratings: Rivals: 247Sports: ESPN: (74)				
Ike Ackerman; EDGE	Omaha, NE	Central	6 ft 4 in (1.93 m)	240 lb (110 kg)	Nov 16, 2024
Ike Ackerman; EDGE	Recruit ratings: Rivals: 247Sports: ESPN: (73)				
Jermaine Minnis; LB	Hyattsville, MD	DeMatha Catholic	6 ft 1 in (1.85 m)	210 lb (95 kg)	Jul 5, 2024
Jermaine Minnis; LB	Recruit ratings: Rivals: 247Sports: ESPN: (74)				
Charlie Christopher; LB	Uniontown, OH	Lake	6 ft 1 in (1.85 m)	220 lb (100 kg)	May 9, 2024
Charlie Christopher; LB	Recruit ratings: Rivals: 247Sports:				
Irving Brown; RB	Teachey, NC	Wallace-Rose Hill	5 ft 10 in (1.78 m)	193 lb (88 kg)	Oct 25, 2024
Irving Brown; RB	Recruit ratings: Rivals: 247Sports:				
Ty Neubert; DL	Columbus, OH	St. Francis De Sales	6 ft 3 in (1.91 m)	250 lb (110 kg)	Jun 23, 2024
Ty Neubert; DL	Recruit ratings: Rivals: 247Sports:				
Angelo Delucia; DL	Canfield, OH	Canfield	6 ft 5 in (1.96 m)	255 lb (116 kg)	Aug 6, 2024
Angelo Delucia; DL	Recruit ratings: Rivals: 247Sports:				
Tyson Long; CB	Pickerington, OH	Pickerington North	6 ft 0 in (1.83 m)	170 lb (77 kg)	Sep 20, 2024
Tyson Long; CB	Recruit ratings: Rivals: 247Sports: ESPN: (76)				
Kolten Bartles; P	Richmond, MI	Richmond Community	5 ft 10 in (1.78 m)	180 lb (82 kg)	Aug 2, 2024
Kolten Bartles; P	Recruit ratings: Rivals: 247Sports: ESPN: (74)				
Brandon Weaver; DL	Hilliard, OH	Hilliard Darby	6 ft 3 in (1.91 m)	250 lb (110 kg)	Dec 17, 2024
Brandon Weaver; DL	Recruit ratings: Rivals:				
Hype Grande; QB	Pasadena, CA	Pasadena	5 ft 11 in (1.80 m)	165 lb (75 kg)	Jan 26, 2025
Hype Grande; QB	Recruit ratings: Rivals: 247Sports:				
Bobby Miller; CB	Orlando, FL	Bishop Moore	6 ft 4 in (1.93 m)	175 lb (79 kg)	Jan 26, 2025
Bobby Miller; CB	Recruit ratings: Rivals:				
Ibrahim Kebe; T	Middletown, OH	Lakota East	6 ft 4 in (1.93 m)	175 lb (79 kg)	Jan 26, 2025
Ibrahim Kebe; T	Recruit ratings: Rivals: 247Sports:				
Rashad Perry; WR	Fresno, CA	Washington Union	5 ft 11 in (1.80 m)	160 lb (73 kg)	Apr 6, 2025
Rashad Perry; WR	Recruit ratings: 247Sports:				
Overall recruit ranking:
‡ Refers to 40-yard dash; Note: In many cases, Scout, Rivals, 247Sports, On3, and ESPN may conflict in their listings of height, weight and 40 time.; In these cases, the average was taken. ESPN grades are on a 100-point scale.; Sources: "Rivals commits". Rivals.; "ESPN commits". ESPN.; "2025 Team Ranking". Rivals.com.; "247Sports commits". 247Sports.

== Awards and honors ==
=== Weekly awards ===
Award	Player	Position	Year	Date	Source
MAC Offensive Player of the Week	Parker Navarro	QB	GS	Sept. 1	
MAC Defensive Player of the Week	Michael Molnar	LB	R-So.	Sept. 8	
MAC Defensive Player of the Week	Cameron Hollobaugh	LB	GS	Sept. 29	
MAC Offensive Player of the Week	Sieh Bangura	RB	R-Sr.	Oct. 20	
MAC Offensive Player of the Week	Parker Navarro	QB	GS	Oct. 27	
MAC Special Teams Player of the Week	Sieh Bangura	KR/RB	R-Sr.	Nov. 10	
MAC Offensive Player of the Week	Sieh Bangura	RB	R-Sr.	Nov. 24	

=== Midseason awards and watch lists ===
Award	Player	Position	Year
Hispanic College Football Player of the Year Award Watch List	Parker Navarro	QB	GS
Biletnikoff Award Watch List	Chase Hendricks	QB	Jr.
2025 Davey O'Brien QB Class	Parker Navarro	QB	GS

=== Award finalists ===
Award	Player	Position	Year
William V. Campbell Trophy	Parker Navarro	QB	GS

=== All-MAC awards ===
Postseason All-MAC teams
Award	Player	Position	Year
All-MAC First Team Offense	Davion Weatherspoon	OL	GS
All-MAC First Team Oefense	Sieh Bangura	RB	R-Sr.
All-MAC Second Team Offense	Parker Navarro	QB	GS
All-MAC Second Team Offense	Jordon Jones	OL	R-Jr.
All-MAC Second Team Offense	Chase Hendricks	WR	R-Jr.
All-MAC Second Team Defense	Jay Crable	DE	R-So.
All-MAC Third Team Offense	Nick Marinaro	OL	GS
All-MAC Third Team Offense	Mason Williams	TE	R-So.
All-MAC Third Team Defense	Tank Pearson	CB	GS

=== National awards ===
National award honors
Honors	Player	Position	Ref.
HERO Sports Group of Five Third Team All-American	Sieh Bangura	RB	
PFF First Team Freshman All-American	Charlie Christopher	LB	
2025 Academic All-America Second Team	Parker Navarro	QB	

== Rankings ==
For the first time since the 2021 season, the Bobcats did not receive any votes in any major poll during the season.

Ranking movements Legend: — = Not ranked
	Week																
Poll	Pre	1	2	3	4	5	6	7	8	9	10	11	12	13	14	15	Final
AP	—	—	—	—	—	—	—	—	—	—	—	—	—	—	—	—	—
Coaches	—	—	—	—	—	—	—	—	—	—	—	—	—	—	—	—	—
CFP	Not released											—	—	—	—	—	Not released

AP -

Coaches -

CFP -
