= Brian Smith (American football coach, born 1980) =

American football player and coach (born 1980)

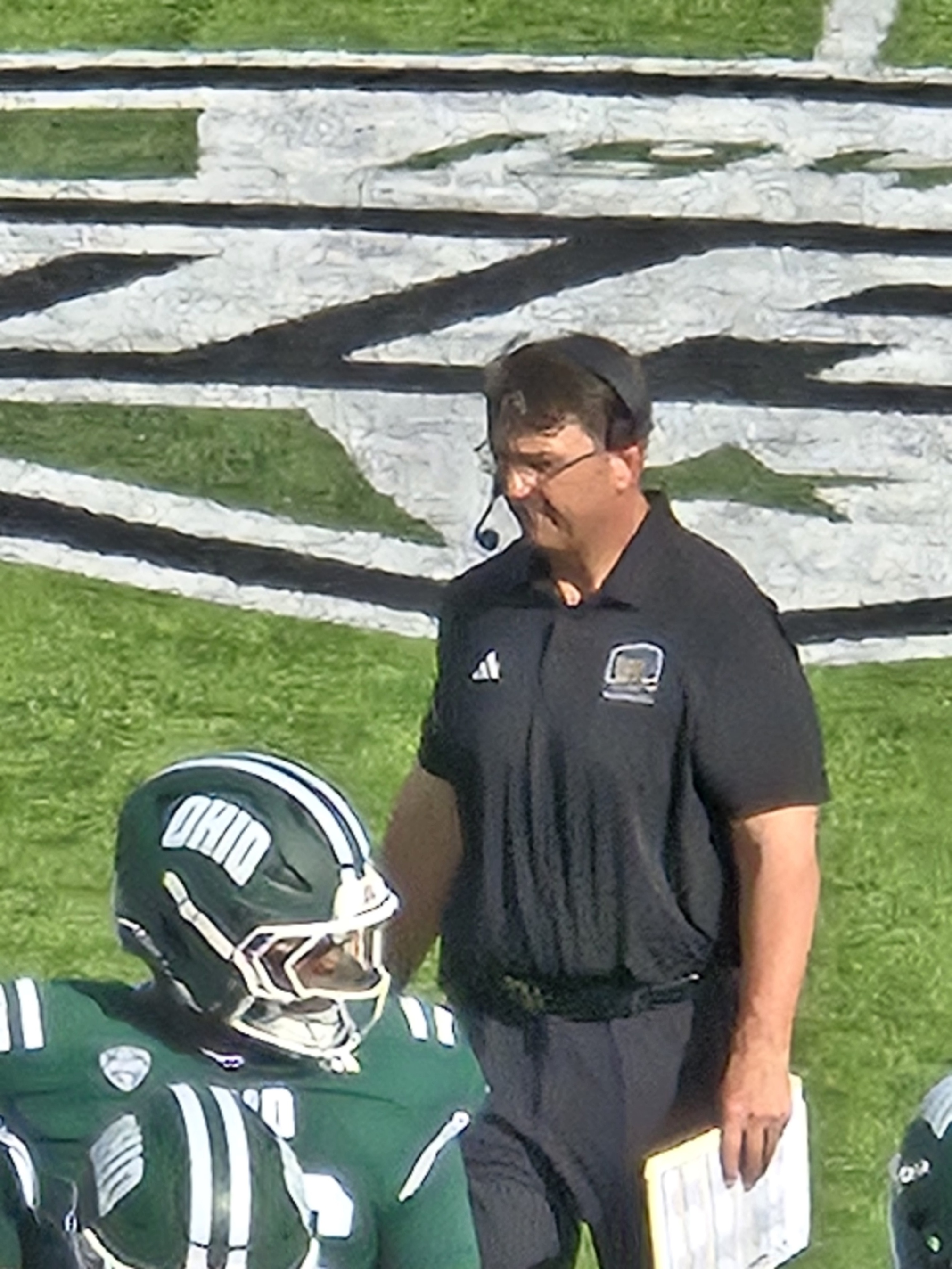
- Brian Smith coaching versus Gardner Webb in 2025

Biographical details
- Born: August 9, 1980 (age 46); Thousand Oaks, California, U.S.

Playing career
- 1998–2001: Hawaii
- Positions: Center, long snapper

Coaching career (HC unless noted)
- 2003: Royal HS (CA) (OL)
- 2004: Hawaii (SA)
- 2005: Cal Lutheran (RB/WR)
- 2006: Oregon State (GA)
- 2007: Portland State (OL)
- 2008: Hawaii (OL)
- 2009–2011: Hawaii (RB)
- 2012: Cal Lutheran (OL)
- 2013–2015: Occidental (OC/OL)
- 2016: Hawaii (AHC/OC/RB)
- 2017: Hawaii (AHC/OC/RB/TE)
- 2018–2019: Hawaii (AHC/OC/RB)
- 2020: Washington State (OC/RB)
- 2021: Washington State (AHC/OC/RB)
- 2022: Ohio (PGC/RB)
- 2023: Ohio (AHC/PGC/RB)
- 2024: Ohio (AHC/OC/RB)
- 2025: Ohio

Head coaching record
- Overall: 9–4

Brian Smith is a former American college football coach, most recently the head coach at Ohio University. He was previously the associate head coach and offensive coordinator at Ohio, Washington State University and the University of Hawaii. He was a college football player for Hawaii.

== Playing career ==
Smith played center at Hawaii from 1998 to 2001. He was also the team's starting long snapper in that same time duration. He was the college roommate of Nick Rolovich, and the two would practice long snaps in their apartment hallway. Following his playing career at Hawaii, Smith signed professional contracts with the Green Bay Packers and Baltimore Ravens in 2002 and 2003, respectively.

== Coaching career ==
After spending one year coaching the offensive line at Royal High School in Simi Valley, California, Smith joined the coaching staff at Hawaii as a student assistant while he completed his bachelor's degree. He also spent time as an assistant at Cal Lutheran, Oregon State, and Portland State.

=== Second stint at Hawaii ===
Smith was hired to be the offensive line coach at Hawaii in 2008 on Greg McMackin's inaugural staff, before shifting to coaching running backs in 2009. Smith was not retained by newly hired head coach Norm Chow for the 2012 season.

=== Return to Cal Lutheran and Occidental ===
Smith spent 2012 as the offensive line coach at Cal Lutheran, and was hired to be the offensive coordinator and offensive line coach at Occidental College in 2013.

=== Third stint at Hawaii ===
Smith joined the Hawaii coaching staff for the third time in his coaching career, this time under his college roommate Rolovich and as the associate head coach and offensive coordinator. He was also the team's running backs coach the entire duration of his stint, while also working as the tight ends coach in 2017 before the position was vacated in 2018 due to the change in offensive scheme from spread option to run and shoot.

=== Washington State ===
After Rolovich departed Hawaii to be the next head coach at Washington State, Smith was considered by the public eye to be a possible successor to Rolovich at Hawaii before Todd Graham was named the Rainbow Warriors head coach a couple of weeks later. Smith was then officially added to Rolovich's coaching staff as the offensive coordinator & running backs coach. He added the title of associate head coach in 2021.

=== Ohio ===
Smith was named the passing game coordinator and running backs coach at Ohio in 2022. In his first season with the Bobcats Smith coached running back Sieh Bangura to Freshman All-American honors and MAC Freshman of the Year honors while improving the Ohio passing attack to 23rd nationally, up from 108th in previous season. Prior to the 2023 season Smith was promoted to associate head coach and helped the Bobcats to a second straight ten win season. Prior to the 2024 season he has taken over play calling duties as Ohio's new offensive coordinator.

In 2024 the football team had a third straight ten win season and his unit led the MAC in total offense. Ohio defeated Miami in the MAC Championship game to give the Bobcats their first conference championship since 1968. He was named the interim head coach for the 2024 Cure Bowl after Tim Albin resigned to take the head coach position at Charlotte. Ohio named him the permanent head coach a week later. Ohio won the bowl 30–27 and gave Brian Smith his first ever win, Ohio its first ever 11 win season, and extended Ohio's bowl winning streak to six games. After an 8–4 regular season in 2025, Smith went on leave on December 1, 2025, with defensive coordinator John Hauser taking over as interim head coach. On December 17, 2025, the university announced that it had fired Smith, citing "serious professional misconduct and...activities that reflect unfavorably on the University."

== Head coaching record ==
Year	Team	Overall	Conference	Standing	Bowl/playoffs
Ohio Bobcats (Mid-American Conference) (2024–2025)
2024	Ohio	1–0			W Cure (Note: Smith became head coach for the Cure Bowl after Tim Albin resigned)
2025	Ohio	8–4	6–2	T–2nd	Frisco (Note: Smith was fired prior to the bowl game)
Ohio:		9–4	6–2		
Total:		9–4			
