= John Hauser (American football) =

American football player and coach (born 1975)

Current position
- Title: Head coach
- Team: Ohio
- Conference: MAC
- Record: 9–3

Biographical details
- Born: February 27, 1980 (age 46); Columbus, Ohio, U.S.
- Education: Wittenberg University

Playing career
- 1998: Ball State
- 1999–2002: Wittenberg
- Position: FS

Coaching career (HC unless noted)
- 2003: Wittenberg (asst.)
- 2004–2005: Northern Illinois (GA)
- 2006–2008: Northern Illinois (DB)
- 2009–2011: Wayne State (DC/DB)
- 2013: The Citadel (S/OLB)
- 2014–2015: Miami (OH) (DB)
- 2016–2021: Miami (OH) (co-DC/CB)
- 2022: Ohio (S)
- 2023: Ohio (S/DPGC)
- 2024: Ohio (DC/S)
- 2025: Ohio (AHC/DC/S)
- 2025–present: Ohio

Administrative career (AD unless noted)
- 2012: Illinois (dir. of player personnel)

Head coaching record
- Overall: 9–3
- Bowls: 1–0

John Hauser (born February 27, 1980) is an American football coach and former football player. He is currently the head coach at Ohio University. Before joining the staff at Ohio, he was the co-defensive coordinator at Miami University.

== Early life and education ==
Hauser was born in Columbus, Ohio and is an alumnus of Bishop Hartley High School where he played football and won a state championship in baseball. After one year at Ball State University, he attended Wittenberg University in Ohio where he played college football as a safety from 1999 to 2002. He was a Division III All-American in 2002 and received his bachelor's degree in business management. He earned his master's degree from Northern Illinois University in adult education in 2007.

== Coaching career ==
Hauser's first coaching position was as an assistant at his alma mater Wittenberg for one season in 2003. He was a graduate assistant at Northern Illinois before being promoted to defensive backs coach in 2006. He left NIU for his first defensive coordinator position at Wayne State. In his three seasons with the Warriors he led a defense that led NCAA Division II in sacks, coached three NFL free-agents signees, and his defense helped Wayne State reach the national championship game for the first time in 2011.

After brief stops at Illinois and The Citadel he came back to the state of Ohio and the MAC where he began a long stint at Miami (OH) under Chuck Martin with the first two years as the defensive backs coach before being promoted to co-defensive coordinator in 2016. In 2016 and 2017 his defenses finished third in the MAC in scoring defense both seasons and had another good showing by placing fourth in 2018. In 2019 they were better. They finished second in the MAC in scoring and third in total defense while leading Miami to a MAC championship that year. In 2020 and 2021 Miami finished third in the MAC in total defense both years.

Hauser joined Tim Albin's staff at Ohio in 2022, first as the safeties coach, before also taking over the duties as defensive passing game coordinator a year later. Prior to the 2024 season he was promoted to defensive coordinator.

In 2024 the football team had a third-straight nine win regular season. His defense finished the regular season third in the MAC in points per game. At 7–1 in MAC play they qualified to play Miami in the MAC Championship game Ohio defeated Miami in the MAC Championship game to give the Bobcats their first conference championship since 1968. Ohio then won the 2024 Cure Bowl by a score of 30–27 and gave Ohio its first ever 11 win season, and extended Ohio's bowl winning streak to six games. After the season, new head coach Brian Smith promoted him to Associate Head Coach.

=== Ohio ===
Ohio named Hauser interim head coach on December 1, 2025, after Smith went on leave following an 8–4 2025 regular season. Hauser earned his first win as a head coach with a 17–10 win over UNLV in the Frisco Bowl. He was named full-time head coach three days after the bowl on December 26.

== Head coaching record ==
Year	Team	Overall	Conference	Standing	Bowl/playoffs
Ohio Bobcats (Mid-American Conference) (2025–present)
2025	Ohio	1–0	0–0		W Frisco (Note: Hauser coached the bowl game after Brian Smith went on leave and was eventually fired)
2026	Ohio	8–3	6–1		
Ohio:		9–3	6–1		
Total:		9–3			
