= 2025 Bowling Green Falcons football team =

American college football season

2025 Bowling Green Falcons football
- Conference: Mid-American Conference
- Record: 4–8 (2–6 MAC)
- Head coach: Eddie George (1st season)
- Offensive coordinator: Travis Partridge (1st season)
- Co-offensive coordinator: Greg Nosal (4th season)
- Offensive scheme: Pro-style
- Defensive coordinator: Brandon Fisher (1st season)
- Base defense: Multiple 3–3–5
- Home stadium: Doyt Perry Stadium

2025 Mid-American Conference football standings
	Conf.			Overall
Team	W		L	W		L
Western Michigan y$	7	–	1	10	–	4
Miami (OH) y	6	–	2	7	–	7
Ohio	6	–	2	9	–	4
Toledo	6	–	2	8	–	5
Central Michigan	5	–	3	7	–	6
Akron*	4	–	4	5	–	7
Buffalo	4	–	4	5	–	7
Kent State	4	–	4	5	–	7
Eastern Michigan	3	–	5	4	–	8
Ball State	3	–	5	4	–	8
Bowling Green	2	–	6	4	–	8
Northern Illinois	2	–	6	3	–	9
UMass	0	–	8	0	–	12
Championship: Western Michigan 23, Miami (OH) 13
$ – Conference champion; y – Championship game participant; * Ineligible for postseason play due to low APR score

The 2025 Bowling Green Falcons football team represented Bowling Green State University in the Mid-American Conference during the 2025 NCAA Division I FBS football season. The Falcons were led by Eddie George in his first year as the head coach. The Falcons played home games at Doyt Perry Stadium, located in Bowling Green, Ohio.

== Offseason ==
=== Transfers ===
==== Outgoing ====
Player	Position	Destination
Camden Orth	QB	Chattanooga
Dominic Grguric	WR	Davenport
Rahkeem Smith	WR	Georgia Tech
Joseph Sipp Jr.	LB	Kansas
Rico Steele	OL	Kent State
Alex Wollschlaeger	OL	Kentucky
Joe Shimko	DL	Lafayette
Tracy Revels	DB	Michigan State
Jordan Dunbar	DB	Missouri State
Justin Lamson	QB	Montana State
Edward Rhambo	DB	Nevada
Justin Pegues	RB	North Alabama
Marcus Moore Jr.	DL	Purdue
CJ Brown	DB	Sam Houston
Davonte Miles	DL	South Carolina
JT Kitna	QB	Stephen F. Austin
Jonny Sorensen	QB	St. Francis (IL)
Jaylon Tillman	WR	UT Permian Basin
Terion Stewart	RB	Virginia Tech
Jalen Burton	DB	West Georgia
Alan Anaya	K	West Texas A&M
Nick Reimer	OL	Western Kentucky
Sefa Saipaia	LB	Western Michigan
Alijah Williams	DE	Wofford
Chris Edmonds	RB	Unknown
Dillon Robinson	OL	Unknown
Isaac Hill	TE	Unknown
Elias Owens	DE	Unknown
Shawn Thigpen	WR	Unknown
Kal-El Pascal	CB	Withdrawn
Dierre Kelly	DL	Withdrawn

==== Incoming ====
Player	Position	Previous school
Marcus Moore Jr.	DL	Akron
Gideon ESPN Lampron	LB	Dayton
Sefa Saipaia	LB	Ferris State
Arlis Boardingham	TE	Florida
Brennan Ridley	WR	Hampton
Mark Cannon Jr.	DB	Illinois State
JoJo Johnson	DB	Indiana
Jordan Dunbar	DB	Kansas State
AJ Odom	DE	Memphis
Isaiah Thomison	LB	Memphis
Austin Clay	WR	Michigan State
Austyn Dendy	RB	Missouri
Drew Pyne	QB	Missouri
Mayes Doggan	DB	Northwest Missouri State
Reis Stocksdale	WR	Ohio State
Allen Middleton	WR	Southern Illinois
Justin Lamson	QB	Stanford
Alexis Sanchez	OL	Tennessee State
Eriq George	DL	Tennessee State
Jalen McClendon	DB	Tennessee State
Kaderris Roberts	RB	Tennessee State
Caden Marshall	LB	Tennessee State
Jyrin Johnson	TE	Texas Southern
Jay'Quan Bostic	DB	Toledo
Collins Acheampong	DE	UCLA
Andrew Kilfoyl	OL	USF
Andrew Hines III	LB	Wake Forest
Hunter Najm	QB	Washington State
Key'on Washington	DB	West Virginia
Mateo Sudipo	DB	Western Carolina

== Preseason ==
The MAC Football Kickoff was held on Thursday, July 24, 2025, at the Ford Field in Detroit, Michigan from 9:00 am EDT to 1:30 pm EDT.

=== Preseason polls ===
==== Coaches Poll ====
On July 24 the MAC announced the preseason coaches' poll.

MAC Coaches poll
Predicted finish	Team	Votes (1st place)
1	Toledo	135 (7)
2	Miami	131 (3)
3	Ohio	123 (3)
4	Buffalo	115
5	Northern Illinois	94
6	Bowling Green	81
7	Western Michigan	71
8	Eastern Michigan	68
9	Central Michigan	65
10	Ball State	41
T11	Akron	39
T11	Massachusetts	39
13	Kent State	12

Coaches poll (MAC Championship)
Predicted finish	Team	Votes
1	Toledo	6
2	Miami	4
3	Ohio	3

== Schedule ==
Date	Time	Opponent	Site	TV	Result	Attendance
August 28	6:00 p.m.	Lafayette*	Doyt Perry Stadium; Bowling Green, OH	ESPN+	W 26–7	19,328
September 6	3:30 p.m.	at Cincinnati*	Nippert Stadium; Cincinnati, OH	ESPN+	L 20–34	35,421
September 13	5:00 p.m.	Liberty*^{†}	Doyt Perry Stadium; Bowling Green, OH	ESPN+	W 23–13	23,159
September 20	12:00 p.m.	at Louisville*	L&N Federal Credit Union Stadium; Louisville, KY	ACCN	L 17–40	49,482
September 27	12:00 p.m.	at Ohio	Peden Stadium; Athens, OH	CBSSN	L 20–35	20,027
October 11	12:00 p.m.	Toledo	Doyt Perry Stadium; Bowling Green, OH (Battle of I-75)	ESPNU	W 28–23	24,000
October 18	12:00 p.m.	Central Michigan	Doyt Perry Stadium; Bowling Green, OH	CBSSN	L 6–27	23,105
October 25	12:00 p.m.	at Kent State	Dix Stadium; Kent, OH (Anniversary Award)	ESPN+	L 21–24	9,260
November 1	12:00 p.m.	Buffalo	Doyt Perry Stadium; Bowling Green, OH	ESPN+	L 3–28	11,876
November 8	1:00 p.m.	at Eastern Michigan	Rynearson Stadium; Ypsilanti, MI	ESPN+	L 21–27	11,889
November 18	7:00 p.m.	Akron	Doyt Perry Stadium; Bowling Green, OH	ESPNU	L 16–19	9,867
November 25	4:30 p.m.	at UMass	Warren McGuirk Alumni Stadium; Hadley, MA	ESPNU	W 45–14	6,043
*Non-conference game; ^{†}Homecoming; All times are in Eastern time

== Roster ==
2025 Bowling Green Falcons football team roster
Players
Coaches
Offense

Pos.	#	Name	Class
WR	1	Allen Middleton	So
WR	2	RJ Garcia II	Sr
QB	3	Lucian Anderson III	So
RB	4	Chris McMillian	Jr
WR	5	Brennan Ridley	So
WR	6	Reis Stocksdale	GS
TE	7	Jyrin Johnson	Sr
QB	8	Baron May	GS
QB	9	Drew Pyne	GS
QB	10	Hunter Najm	Fr
WR	11	Finn Hogan	Sr
WR	12	DeShaun Lanier	Fr
WR	13	Cynceir McNeal	So
RB	14	Austyn Dendy	Fr
WR	15	Caleb Goodloe	Fr
WR	16	Austin Clay	Fr
WR	17	Trey Johnson	Jr
WR	18	Winn Sharp	So
QB	19	Carsen Melvin	Fr
RB	20	Kaderris Roberts	Sr
RB	22	Nakai Amachree	Fr
RB	23	Chris Edmonds	So
RB	24	Bryce DeFalco	So
RB	25	Mar'Kel Porter	Fr
RB	26	Cameron Pettaway	Fr
RB	30	PaSean Wimberly (C)	GS
FB	44	Leo Kemp	Jr
OT	50	Vincent Giordano	Fr
G	53	Masyn Zahursky	Fr
C	54	Brody Bolyn	So
OT	55	Tunde Fatukasi	GS
C	57	Alex Padgett	Sr
OT	58	Ethan Kraatz	Fr
C	65	Jake Burns	GS
OT	66	Zane Panchula	Fr
G	69	Andrew Kilfoyl	Sr
OT	70	Alex Harris	Fr
G	72	Cade Zimmerly	GS
G	73	Caden Campbell	Fr
OT	75	Nate Pabst	Sr
G	77	James Thomas Jr.	So
G	78	Alexis Sanchez	Jr
TE	80	Ocean Brabbs	Fr
TE	81	Arlis Boardingham	Jr
TE	82	Eli Jacon-Duffy	Fr
WR	83	Pierce St Geme	Fr
WR	85	Reece Little	Fr
TE	86	Jeremiah Scoby	Fr
WR	87	Jared Merk	So
TE	88	Jacob Harris	So
TE	89	Blane Cleaver	GS

Defense

Pos.	#	Name	Class
S	0	Kal-El Pascal	So
LB	3	Dorian Pringle	So
LB	4	Gideon Lampron	Jr
DE	5	Eriq George	Jr
S	6	Victor Vazquez	GS
LB	7	David Afogho	So
CB	8	Jalen McClendon	Sr
S	9	Darius Lorfils	Sr
CB	10	JoJo Johnson	Sr
DE	11	Collins Acheampong	So
LB	12	Caden Marshall	Fr
S	13	Mateo Sudipo	GS
CB	14	Keyon Washington	Fr
S	15	Preston EstoEsta	Fr
S	16	Jay'Quan Bostic	Fr
LB	17	Isaiah Thomison	So
LB	18	Andrew Hines III	Fr
S	19	Jahai Johnson	Fr
LB	20	TJ Nelson	Fr
CB	21	Gavin Harris	Fr
CB	22	MJ Cannon	Jr
DE	23	Myles Bradley	Jr
LB	24	Justin Eklund	Jr
CB	25	Jace Henry	So
CB	26	Josira Andrews	Fr
S	27	Coleman Teasdale	So
S	31	D'kyah Banks	Fr
CB	32	Rico Garcia	Fr
DE	33	Jaimion Olverson	Fr
CB	34	Tyron Steed	Fr
LB	35	Cashmire Lewis	Fr
LB	36	Jabari Mitchell	So
CB	37	Garrison Blair	Fr
DT	38	Dierre Kelly	Sr
ILB	39	Henry Reifschneider	Fr
S	40	DeVenchi Arnold II	Fr
CB	41	Jahvion Jarmon	Fr
LB	42	Chris Williams	Sr
DT	43	Martreece Dillard	Fr
LB	44	AJ Odom	Jr
DE	45	Bam Booker	Sr
DE	48	Quentin Lewis	Fr
DT	54	Dior Garner	Fr
DT	55	Evan Branch-Haynes	GS
DT	56	Ian van der Merwe	Jr
DT	57	Dayln White	So
DT	58	Ashton Yeager	Fr
DT	98	Malik Moses	Fr
DT	99	Brendon Rice	Fr

Special teams

Pos.	#	Name	Class
K	14	Jackson Kleather	Jr
P	19	John Henderson	Sr
K	27	Treyton McKee	Fr
PK	40	Ethan Warner	Jr
LS	41	Quillan Jimenez	So
K	46	Zach Long	GS
LS	47	George Carlson	Sr
PK	85	Travis Kenner	So

Head coach

- Eddie George

Coordinators/assistant coaches

- Brandon Fisher – Associate Head Coach / Defensive Coordinator
- Travis Partridge – Co-Offensive Coordinator / Passing Game Coordinator / Quarterbacks
- Greg Nosal – Co-Offensive Coordinator / Offensive Line
- Alex Bayer – Special Teams Coordinator
- Dewayne Alexander – Assistant Head Coach / Tight Ends
- Joe Bowden – Assistant Coach / Linebackers
- Josh Crawford – Assistant Coach / Running Backs
- Derrick Jackson – Assistant Coach / Defensive Backs
- Bruce Johnson – Assistant Coach / Wide Receivers
- Richard McNutt – Assistant Coach / Secondary
- Clyde Simmons – Assistant Coach / Defensive Line
- Brian White – Senior Analyst / Running Backs
- Chris Fenelon – Head Football Strength & Conditioning Coach
- C. J. McFarland – Associate Football Strength & Conditioning Coach
- Ed Sykes – Assistant Football Strength & Conditioning Coach
- Levi Gazarek – Offensive Quality Control
- Jack McCarthy – Offensive Quality Control

Legend

- (C) Team captain
- (S) Suspended
- (I) Ineligible
- Injured
- Redshirt

Roster
Last update: August 17, 2025

== Game summaries ==
=== Lafayette (FCS) ===
Lafayette Leopards (FCS) (0–0) at Bowling Green Falcons (0–0) – Game summary

Quarter	1	2	3	4	Total
Leopards (FCS)	0	0	7	0	7
Falcons	7	10	6	3	26

at Doyt Perry Stadium • Bowling Green, Ohio

- Date: August 28
- Game time: 6:00 PM EDT
- Game weather: Sunny • Temperature: 67 °F (19 °C) • Wind: SW at 10 miles per hour (16 km/h)
- Game attendance: 19,328
- Referee: Rich Edwards
- TV announcers (ESPN+): Evan Stockton (play-by-play) and Marcus Ray (analyst)

Game information

First quarter

- BGSU – Cameron Pettaway 98-yard kickoff return (Jackson Kleather kick), 14:49. Falcons 7–0.

Second quarter

- BGSU – Jackson Kleather 30-yard field goal, 14:15. Falcons 10–0. Drive: 17 plays, 51 yards, 9:08.
- BGSU – Mar'Kel Porter 4-yard run (Jackson Kleather kick), 0:20. Falcons 17–0. Drive: 6 plays, 45 yards, 1:37.

Third quarter

- BGSU – Jackson Kleather 56-yard field goal, 10:11. Falcons 20–0. Drive: 7 plays, 27 yards, 3:19.
- LAF – Elijah Steward 5-yard pass from Dean DeNobile (Jack Simonetta kick), 3:39. Falcons 20–7. Drive: 14 plays, 75 yards, 6:32.
- BGSU – Jackson Kleather 39-yard field goal, 1:10. Falcons 23–7. Drive: 5 plays, 21 yards, 2:20.

Fourth quarter

- BGSU – Jackson Kleather 35-yard field goal, 4:47. Falcons 26–7. Drive: 6 plays, 11 yards, 2:00.

Statistics	LAF	BGSU
First downs	11	17
Plays–yards	56–184	61–267
Rushes–yards	28–66	43–158
Passing yards	118	109
Passing: comp–att–int	15–28–0	12–18–0
Turnovers	0	0
Time of possession	27:40	32:20

Team	Category	Player	Statistics
Lafayette	Passing	Dean DeNobile	13/26, 112 yards, TD
Lafayette	Rushing	Kente Edwards	10 carries, 27 yards
Lafayette	Receiving	Ethan Hosak	2 receptions, 30 yards
Bowling Green	Passing	Drew Pyne	12/18, 109 yards
Bowling Green	Rushing	Kaderris Roberts	12 carries, 66 yards
Bowling Green	Receiving	RJ Garcia II	2 receptions, 32 yards

=== at Cincinnati ===
Bowling Green Falcons (1–0) at Cincinnati Bearcats (0–1) – Game summary

Quarter	1	2	3	4	Total
Falcons	0	3	7	10	20
Bearcats	7	14	10	3	34

at Nippert Stadium • Cincinnati, Ohio

- Date: September 6
- Game time: 3:30 PM EDT
- Game weather: Sunny • Temperature: 70 °F (21 °C)
- Game attendance: 35,421
- Referee: Kevin Mar
- TV announcers (ESPN+): James Westling (play-by-play), Leger Douzable (analyst), and Shane Sparks (sideline)

Game information

First quarter

- CIN – Cyrus Allen 44-yard pass from Brendan Sorsby (Stephen Rusnak kick), 7:23. Bearcats 7–0. Drive: 3 plays, 64 yards, 1:00.

Second quarter

- CIN – Cyrus Allen 2-yard pass from Brendan Sorsby (Stephen Rusnak kick), 13:17. Bearcats 14–0. Drive: 7 plays, 65 yards, 2:55.
- CIN – Jeff Caldwell 9-yard from Brendan Sorsby (Stephen Rusnak kick), 6:11. Bearcats 21–0. Drive: 7 plays, 89 yards, 3:08.
- BGSU – Jackson Kleather 25-yard field goal, 0:23. Bearcats 21–3. Drive: 18 plays, 68 yards, 5:48.

Third quarter

- CIN – Stephen Rusnak 40-yard field goal, 12:58. Bearcats 24–3. Drive: 6 plays, 55 yards, 1:58.
- BGSU – Jyrin Johnson 31-yard pass from Drew Pyne (Jackson Kleather kick), 4:03. Bearcats 24–10. Drive: 2 plays, 34 yards, 0:47.
- CIN – Brendan Sorsby 9-yard run (Stephen Rusnak kick), 0:24. Bearcats 31–10. Drive: 8 plays, 75 yards, 3:39.

Fourth quarter

- BGSU – Mar'Kel Porter 1-yard run (Jackson Kleather kick), 10:35. Bearcats 31–17. Drive: 8 plays, 65 yards, 4:49.
- CIN – Stephen Rusnak 23-yard field goal, 6:12. Bearcats 34–17. Drive: 10 plays, 60 yards, 4:23.
- BGSU – Jackson Kleather 30-yard field goal, 1:55. Bearcats 34–20. Drive: 10 plays, 63 yards, 4:17.

Statistics	BGSU	CIN
First downs	21	18
Plays–yards	71–372	53–439
Rushes–yards	34–98	29–106
Passing yards	274	333
Passing: comp–att–int	29–37–0	17–24–0
Turnovers	0	1
Time of possession	37:11	22:49

Team	Category	Player	Statistics
Bowling Green	Passing	Drew Pyne	29/36, 274 yards, TD
Bowling Green	Rushing	Cameron Pettaway	13 carries, 72 yards
Bowling Green	Receiving	Jyrin Johnson	7 receptions, 80 yards, TD
Cincinnati	Passing	Brendan Sorsby	17/24, 333 yards, 3 TD
Cincinnati	Rushing	Brendan Sorsby	7 carries, 40 yards, TD
Cincinnati	Receiving	Jeff Caldwell	5 receptions, 109 yards, TD

=== Liberty ===
Liberty Flames (1–1) at Bowling Green Falcons (1–1) – Game summary

Quarter	1	2	3	4	Total
Flames	0	0	7	6	13
Falcons	3	7	3	10	23

at Doyt Perry Stadium • Bowling Green, Ohio

- Date: September 13
- Game time: 5:00 PM EDT
- Game weather: Cloudy • Temperature: 76 °F (24 °C) • Wind: NE at 6 miles per hour (9.7 km/h)
- Game attendance: 23,159
- Referee: Ron Hudson
- TV announcers (ESPN+): Michael Reghi (play-by-play) and Marcus Ray (analyst)

Game information

First quarter

- (8:44) BGSU – Jackson Kleather 48-yard field goal (Drive: 10 plays, 29 yards, 4:52; Bowling Green 3–0)

Second quarter

- (0:08) BGSU – Jacob Harris 12-yard pass from Drew Pyne, Jackson Kleather kick (Drive: 5 plays, 23 yards, 0:21; Bowling Green 10–0)

Third quarter

- (7:10) LIB – Donte Lee Jr. 44-yard pass from Ethan Vasko, Brayden Beck kick (Drive: 8 plays, 78 yards, 4:17; Bowling Green 10–7)
- (1:23) BGSU – Jackson Kleather 26-yard field goal (Drive: 13 plays, 67 yards, 5:44; Bowling Green 13–7)

Fourth quarter

- (13:43) BGSU – Jackson Kleather 50-yard field goal (Drive: 5 plays, 19 yards, 1:11; Bowling Green 16–7)
- (11:48) BGSU – Chris McMillian 7-yard run, Jackson Kleather kick (Drive: 2 plays, 26 yards, 0:29; Bowling Green 23–7)
- (2:46) LIB – Evan Dickens 12-yard run (Drive: 8 plays, 75 yards, 2:16; Bowling Green 23–13)

Statistics	LIB	BGSU
First downs	17	17
Plays–yards	64–346	68–304
Rushes–yards	39–152	36–158
Passing yards	194	146
Passing: Comp–Att–Int	13–25–2	16–32–0
Turnovers	4	0
Time of possession	28:51	31:09

Team	Category	Player	Statistics
Liberty	Passing	Ethan Vasko	13/24, 194 yards, TD, 2 INT
Liberty	Rushing	Evan Dickens	15 carries, 96 yards, TD
Liberty	Receiving	Donte Lee Jr.	3 receptions, 77 yards, TD
Bowling Green	Passing	Drew Pyne	16/31, 146 yards, TD
Bowling Green	Rushing	Kaderris Roberts	10 carries, 59 yards
Bowling Green	Receiving	RJ Garcia II	3 receptions, 38 yards

=== at Louisville ===
Bowling Green Falcons (2–1) at Louisville Cardinals (2–0) – Game summary

Quarter	1	2	3	4	Total
Falcons	3	0	0	14	17
Cardinals	7	14	9	10	40

at L&N Federal Credit Union Stadium • Louisville, Kentucky

- Date: September 20
- Game time: 12:00 p.m. EDT
- Game weather: Sunny • Temperature: 81 °F (27 °C) • Wind: NW at 3 miles per hour (4.8 km/h)
- Game attendance: 49,482
- Referee: Darryl DeBerry
- TV announcers (ACCN): Chris Cotter (play-by-play), Max Browne (analyst) and Kendra Douglas (sideline)

Game information

First quarter

- (6:44) BGSU – Jackson Kleather 49-yard field goal (Drive: 4 plays, 8 yards, 2:07; Bowling Green 3–0)
- (2:03) LOU – Keyjuan Brown 2-yard run (Cooper Ranvier kick) (Drive: 7 plays, 60 yards, 4:41; Louisville 7–3)

Second quarter

- (10:27) LOU – Keyjuan Brown 1-yard run (Cooper Ranvier kick) (Drive: 10 plays, 79 yards, 4:20; Louisville 14–3)
- (8:13) LOU – Caullin Lacy 75-yard punt return (Cooper Ranvier kick) (Louisville 21–3)

Third quarter

- (10:34) LOU – Cooper Ranvier 24-yard field goal (Drive: 8 plays, 68 yards, 4:26; Louisville 24–3)
- (7:21) LOU – Cooper Ranvier 40-yard field goal (Drive: 5 plays, 33 yards, 1:07; Louisville 27–3)
- (2:24) LOU – Nick Keller 57-yard field goal (Drive: 8 plays, 26 yards, 4:10; Louisville 30–3)

Fourth quarter

- (12:53) LOU – Cooper Ranvier 48-yard field goal (Drive: 4 plays, 5 yards, 1:57; Louisville 33–3)
- (12:37) BGSU – Lucien Anderson III 75-yard run (Jackson Kleather kick) (Drive: 2 plays, 75 yards, 0:16; Louisville 33–10)
- (6:50) LOU – Braxton Jennings 3-yard run (Cooper Ranvier kick) (Drive: 9 plays, 75 yards, 5:47; Louisville 40–10)
- (4:16) BGSU – Jacob Harris 38-yard pass from Drew Pyne (Jackson Kleather kick) (Drive: 4 plays, 75 yards, 2:34; Louisville 40–17)

Statistics	BGSU	LOU
First downs	14	21
Plays–yards	50–326	61–468
Rushes–yards	29–195	29–155
Passing yards	131	313
Passing: comp–att–int	11–21–2	24–32–0
Turnovers	2	1
Time of possession	25:45	34:15

Team	Category	Player	Statistics
Bowling Green	Passing	Drew Pyne	11/21, 131 yards, TD, 2 INT
Bowling Green	Rushing	Lucien Anderson III	4 carries, 79 yards, TD
Bowling Green	Receiving	Jacob Harris	3 receptions, 46 yards, TD
Louisville	Passing	Miller Moss	23/31, 316 yards
Louisville	Rushing	Keyjuan Brown	11 carries, 83 yards, 2 TD
Louisville	Receiving	Caullin Lacy	8 receptions, 96 yards

=== at Ohio ===
Bowling Green Falcons (2–2) at Ohio Bobcats (2–2) – Game summary

Quarter	1	2	3	4	Total
Falcons	10	3	0	7	20
Bobcats	14	7	7	7	35

at Peden Stadium • Athens, Ohio

- Date: September 27
- Game time: 12:00 p.m.
- Game weather: Sunny Temperature 77 °F (25 °C), Wind NE 5mph
- Game attendance: 20,027
- Referee: William Williams
- TV announcers (CBSSN): Jordan Kent (play-by-play) and Adam Breneman (analyst)

Game information

First quarter

- (12:59) OHIO – Cameron Hollobaugh 71-yard interception return (Brack Peacock kick); OHIO 7–0
- (10:02) BGSU – Kaderris Roberts 27-yard pass from Drew Pyne (Jackson Kleather kick), 6 plays, 75 yards, 2:57; Tied 7–7
- (05:35) OHIO – Mason Williams 19-yard pass from Parker Navarro (Brack Peacock kick), 10 plays, 75 yards, 4:27; OHIO 14–7
- (03:24) BGSU – Jackson Kleather 26-yard field goal, 8 plays, 63 yards, 2:57; OHIO 14–10

Second quarter

- (05:35) OHIO – Chase Hendricks 25-yard pass from Parker Navarro (Brack Peacock kick), 6 plays, 57 yards, 2:23; OHIO 21–10
- (03:24) BGSU – Jackson Kleather 33-yard field goal, 12 plays, 71 yards, 3:43; OHIO 21–13

Third quarter

- (05:42) OHIO – Parker Navarro 5-yard run (Brack Peacock kick), 3 plays, 27 yards, 1:27; OHIO 28–13

Fourth quarter

- (09:41) BGSU – Chris McMillian 15-yard run (Jackson Kleather kick), 6 plays, 55 yards, 1:48; OHIO 28–20
- (06:20) OHIO – Parker Navarro 34-yard run (Brack Peacock kick), 6 plays, 75 yards, 3:21; OHIO 35–20

Statistics	BGSU	OHIO
First downs	21	24
Plays–yards	65–350	64–439
Rushes–yards	36–180	39–231
Passing yards	170	208
Passing: Comp–Att–Int	19–29–3	17–25–1
Turnovers	4	3
Time of possession	30:31	29:29

Team	Category	Player	Statistics
Bowling Green	Passing	Drew Pyne	19/29, 170 yards, TD, 3 INT
Bowling Green	Rushing	Chris McMillian	11 carries, 89 yards
Bowling Green	Receiving	Finn Hogan	3 receptions, 51 yards
Ohio	Passing	Parker Navarro	7/25, 208 yards, 2 TD, INT
Ohio	Rushing	Sieh Bangura	18 carries, 115 yards
Ohio	Receiving	Mason Williams	8 receptions, 93 yards, TD

=== Toledo (Battle of I-75) ===
Toledo Rockets (3–2) at Bowling Green Falcons (2–3) – Game summary

Quarter	1	2	3	4	Total
Rockets	14	7	0	2	23
Falcons	0	7	7	14	28

at Doyt Perry Stadium • Bowling Green, Ohio

- Date: October 11
- Game time: 12:00 p.m. EDT
- Game weather: Sunny • Temperature: 68 °F (20 °C) • Wind: N at 7 miles per hour (11 km/h)
- Game attendance: 24,000
- Referee: Marcel Kerr
- TV announcers (ESPNU): Matt Schumacker (play-by-play) and Dustin Fox (analyst)

Game information

First quarter

- (12:03) TOL – Chip Trayanum 14-yard run, Dylan Cunanan kick (Drive: 6 plays, 75 yards, 2:57; Toledo 7–0)
- (3:39) TOL – Tucker Gleason 12-yard run, Dylan Cunanan kick (Drive: 7 plays, 67 yards, 3:05; Toledo 14–0)

Second quarter

- (1:29) TOL – Jacob Petersen 17-yard pass from Tucker Gleason, Dylan Cunanan kick (Drive: 5 plays, 43 yards, 1:55; Toledo 21–0)
- (0:13) BGSU – Cameron Pettaway 45-yard pass from Lucian Anderson III, Jackson Kleather kick (Drive: 5 plays, 70 yards, 1:13; Toledo 21–7)

Third quarter

- (1:52) BGSU – Jacob Harris 8-yard pass from Lucian Anderson III, Jackson Kleather kick (Drive: 7 plays, 51 yards, 3:20; Toledo 21–14)

Fourth quarter

- (7:03) BGSU – Cameron Pettaway 73-yard pass from RJ Garcia II, Jackson Kleather kick (Drive: 2 plays, 71 yards, 0:49; Tied 21–21)
- (6:07) BGSU – Chris McMillian 1-yard run, Jackson Kleather kick (Drive: 1 play, 1 yard, 0:06; Bowling Green 28–21)
- (0:00) TOL – 0-yard safety (Bowling Green 28–23)

Statistics	TOL	BGSU
First downs	23	10
Plays–yards	73–429	53–226
Rushes–yards	43–165	36–61
Passing yards	264	165
Passing: Comp–Att–Int	19–30–1	10–17–1
Turnovers	2	1
Time of possession	31:50	25:52

Team	Category	Player	Statistics
Toledo	Passing	Tucker Gleason	19/30, 264 yards, TD, INT
Toledo	Rushing	Chip Trayanum	27 carries, 125 yards, TD
Toledo	Receiving	Junior Vandeross III	6 receptions, 100 yards
Bowling Green	Passing	Lucian Anderson III	9/16, 92 yards, 2 TD, INT
Bowling Green	Rushing	Lucian Anderson III	10 carries, 32 yards
Bowling Green	Receiving	Cameron Pettaway	2 receptions, 118 yards, 2 TD

=== Central Michigan ===
Central Michigan Chippewas (3–3) at Bowling Green Falcons (3–3) – Game summary

Quarter	1	2	3	4	Total
Chippewas	0	17	10	0	27
Falcons	3	3	0	0	6

at Doyt Perry Stadium • Bowling Green, Ohio

- Date: October 18
- Game time: 12:00 p.m. EDT
- Game weather: Sunny • Temperature: 75 °F (24 °C) • Wind: SW at 15 miles per hour (24 km/h)
- Game attendance: 23,105
- Referee: Rick Warne
- TV announcers (CBSSN): Dave Ryan (play-by-play), Adam Breneman (analyst) and Patrick Peterson (analyst)

Game information

First quarter

- (10:43) BGSU – Jackson Kleather 43-yard field goal (Drive: 8 plays, 50 yards, 4:17; Bowling Green 3-0)

Second quarter

- (13:39) CMU – Angel Flores 1-yard run, Cade Graham kick (Drive: 1 play, 1 yard, 0:02; Central Michigan 7-3)
- (8:04) CMU – Angel Flores 6-yard run, Cade Graham kick (Drive: 7 plays, 79 yards, 3:13; Central Michigan 14-3)
- (3:48) CMU – Cade Graham 38-yard field goal (Drive: 4 plays, 7 yards, 2:11; Central Michigan 17-3)
- (0:53) BGSU – Jackson Kleather 49-yard field goal (Drive: 8 plays, 43 yards, 2:50; Central Michigan 17-6)

Third quarter

- (11:06) CMU – Angel Flores 3-yard run, Cade Graham kick (Drive: 7 plays, 75 yards, 3:54; Central Michigan 24-6)
- (7:09) CMU – Cade Graham 47-yard field goal (Drive: 4 plays, 3 yards, 1:52; Central Michigan 27-6)

Fourth quarter

- No scoring plays.

Statistics	CMU	BGSU
First downs	14	14
Plays–yards	51–276	61–310
Rushes–yards	46–203	36–157
Passing yards	73	153
Passing: Comp–Att–Int	3-5-0	17-25-2
Turnovers	0	2
Time of possession	31:20	28:40

Team	Category	Player	Statistics
Central Michigan	Passing	Joe Labas	2/4, 72 yards
Central Michigan	Rushing	Angel Flores	18 carries, 72 yards, 3 TD
Central Michigan	Receiving	Collin Payne	1 reception, 63 yards
Bowling Green	Passing	Lucian Anderson III	17/25, 153 yards, 2 INT
Bowling Green	Rushing	Lucian Anderson III	11 carries, 53 yards
Bowling Green	Receiving	RJ Garcia II	3 receptions, 60 yards

=== at Kent State (Anniversary Award) ===
Bowling Green Falcons (3–4) at Kent State Golden Flashes (2–5) – Game summary

Quarter	1	2	3	4	Total
Falcons	7	7	7	0	21
Golden Flashes	0	3	14	7	24

at Dix Stadium • Kent, Ohio

- Date: October 25
- Game time: 12:00 p.m. EDT
- Game weather: Cloudy • Temperature: 50 °F (10 °C) • Wind: E at 2 miles per hour (3.2 km/h)
- Game attendance: 9,260
- Referee: William Williams
- TV announcers (ESPN+): Anthony Lima (play-by-play) and Doc Holliday (analyst)

Game information

First quarter

- (9:36) BGSU - Jacob Harris 13-yard pass from Baron May, Jackson Kleather kick (Drive: 9 plays, 61 yards, 3:41; BGSU 7-0)

Second quarter

- (6:12) KENT - Will Hryszko 35-yard field goal (Drive: 10 plays, 47 yards, 4:23; BGSU 7-3)
- (0:33) BGSU - Austin Dendy 1-yard run, Jackson Kleather kick (Drive: 11 plays, 75 yards, 5:39; BGSU 14-3)

Third quarter

- (8:47) BGSU - Baron May 1-yard run, Jackson Kleather kick (Drive: 13 plays, 75 yards, 6:13; BGSU 21-3)
- (6:24) KENT - Cade Wolford 29-yard pass from Dru DeShields, Will Hryszko kick (Drive: 7 plays, 79 yards, 2:18; BGSU 21-10)
- (4:23) KENT - Gavin Garcia 45-yard run, Will Hryszko kick (Drive: 1 play, 45 yards, 0:10; BGSU 21-17)

Fourth quarter

- (3:15) KENT - Wayne Harris 12-yard pass from Da'Realyst Clark, Will Hryszko kick (Drive: 7 plays, 62 yards, 3:34; KENT 24-21)

Statistics	BGSU	KENT
First downs	22	14
Plays–yards	78–379	51–294
Rushes–yards	50–207	28–122
Passing yards	172	172
Passing: Comp–Att–Int	14–28–0	14–23–0
Turnovers	0	0
Time of possession	36:52	23:08

Team	Category	Player	Statistics
Bowling Green	Passing	Baron May	12/22, 142 yards, TD
Bowling Green	Rushing	Austyn Dendy	20 carries, 93 yards, TD
Bowling Green	Receiving	Jyrin Johnson	3 receptions, 53 yards
Kent State	Passing	Dru DeShields	13/22, 160 yards, TD
Kent State	Rushing	Gavin Garcia	6 carries, 55 yards, TD
Kent State	Receiving	Cade Wolford	2 receptions, 66 yards, TD

=== Buffalo ===
Buffalo Bulls (4–4) at Bowling Green Falcons (3–5) – Game summary

Quarter	1	2	3	4	Total
Bulls	7	14	7	0	28
Falcons	0	0	0	3	3

at Doyt Perry Stadium • Bowling Green, Ohio

- Date: November 1
- Game time: 12:00 p.m. EDT
- Game weather: Cloudy • Temperature: 51 °F (11 °C) • Wind: W at 9 miles per hour (14 km/h)
- Game attendance: 11,876
- Referee: Matt Packowski
- TV announcers (ESPN+): Shawn Kenney (play-by-play) and Marcus Ray (analyst)

Game information

First quarter

- BUFF – Al-Jay Henderson 41-yard run (Jack Howes kick), 13:57. Bulls 7–0. Drive: 3 plays, 74 yards, 0:55.

Second quarter

- BUFF – Victor Snow 2-yard run (Jack Howes kick), 14:54. Bulls 14–0. Drive: 6 plays, 64 yards, 3:05.
- BUFF – Jasaiah Gathings 5-yard pass from Ta'Quan Roberson (Jack Howes kick), 0:09. Bulls 21–0. Drive: 3 plays, 6 yards, 1:01.

Third quarter

- BUFF – Victor Snow 65-yard punt return (Jack Howes kick), 13:25. Bulls 28–0.

Fourth quarter

- BGSU – Jackson Kleather 51-yard field goal, 8:33. Bulls 28–3. Drive: 9 plays, 43 yards, 3:31.

Statistics	BUFF	BGSU
First downs	10	15
Plays–yards	51–282	72–216
Rushes–yards	27–146	44–116
Passing yards	136	100
Passing: Comp–Att–Int	13–24–1	11–28–1
Turnovers	1	2
Time of possession	26:00	34:00

Team	Category	Player	Statistics
Buffalo	Passing	Ta'Quan Roberson	13/24, 136 yards, TD, INT
Buffalo	Rushing	Al-Jay Henderson	18 carries, 119 yards, TD
Buffalo	Receiving	Nik McMillan	8 receptions, 105 yards
Bowling Green	Passing	Drew Pyne	7/16, 52 yards
Bowling Green	Rushing	Austyn Dendy	18 carries, 62 yards
Bowling Green	Receiving	Jyrin Johnson	5 receptions, 69 yards

=== at Eastern Michigan ===
Bowling Green Falcons (3–6) at Eastern Michigan Eagles (2–7) – Game summary

Quarter	1	2	3	4	Total
Falcons	7	7	0	7	21
Eagles	10	0	7	10	27

at Rynearson Stadium • Ypsilanti, Michigan

- Date: November 8
- Game time: 1:00 p.m. EDT
- Game weather: Cloudy • Temperature: 46 °F (8 °C) • Wind: N at 6 miles per hour (9.7 km/h)
- Game attendance: 11,889
- Referee: Andrew Speciale
- TV announcers (ESPN+): Michael Reghi (play-by-play) and Ryan Cavanaugh (analyst)

Game information

First quarter

- (10:12) EMU – Tavierre Dunlap 1-yard run, Rudy Kessinger kick (Drive: 9 plays, 59 yards, 3:23; Eastern Michigan 7–0)
- (8:36) BGSU – Austyn Dendy 19-yard run, Jackson Kleather kick (Drive: 4 plays, 35 yards, 1:24; 7–7)
- (3:13) EMU – Rudy Kessinger 27-yard field goal (Drive: 13 plays, 74 yards, 5:17; Eastern Michigan 10–7)

Second quarter

- (3:00) BGSU – Austyn Dendy 16-yard run, Jackson Kleather kick (Drive: 6 plays, 76 yards, 3:43; Bowling Green 14–10)

Third quarter

- (5:57) EMU – Nick Devereaux 12-yard pass from Noah Kim, Rudy Kessinger kick (Drive: 7 plays, 60 yards, 4:01; Eastern Michigan 17–10)

Fourth quarter

- (10:18) EMU – Dontae McMillan 8-yard run, Rudy Kessinger kick (Drive: 6 plays, 69 yards, 3:13; Eastern Michigan 24–14)
- (4:36) BGSU – Jyrin Johnson 2-yard pass from Hunter Najm, Jackson Kleather kick (Drive: 10 plays, 70 yards, 5:35; Bowling Green 24–21)
- (0:57) EMU – Rudy Kessinger 44-yard field goal (Drive: 10 plays, 42 yards, 3:39; Eastern Michigan 27–21)

Statistics	BGSU	EMU
First downs	14	25
Plays–yards	51–259	75–385
Rushes–yards	35–130	35–175
Passing yards	129	210
Passing: Comp–Att–Int	11-16-1	22-40-0
Turnovers	1	0
Time of possession	26:15	33:45

Team	Category	Player	Statistics
Bowling Green	Passing	Hunter Najm	11/15, 129 yards, TD, INT
Bowling Green	Rushing	Austyn Dendy	21 carries, 113 yards, 2 TD
Bowling Green	Receiving	Jyrin Johnson	4 receptions, 36 yards, TD
Eastern Michigan	Passing	Noah Kim	22/39, 210 yards, TD
Eastern Michigan	Rushing	Dontae McMillan	19 carries, 100 yards, TD
Eastern Michigan	Receiving	Nick Devereaux	4 receptions, 79 yards, TD

=== Akron ===
Akron Zips (4–7) at Bowling Green Falcons (3–8) – Game summary

Quarter	1	2	3	4	Total
Zips	3	3	10	3	19
Falcons	3	3	7	3	16

at Doyt Perry Stadium • Bowling Green, Ohio

- Date: November 18
- Game time: 7:00 PM EST
- Game weather: Overcast • Temperature: 40 °F (4 °C) • Wind: ENE at 7 miles per hour (11 km/h)
- Game attendance: 9,867
- Referee: Luke Richmond
- TV announcers (ESPNU): Shawn Kenney (play-by-play) and Je'Rod Cherry (analyst)

Game information

First quarter

- BGSU – Jackson Kleather 28-yard field goal, 8:45. Falcons 3–0. Drive: 14 plays, 65 yards, 6:15.
- AKR – Matthew Schramm 39-yard field goal, 5:14. Tied 3–3. Drive: 7 plays, 51 yards, 3:24.

Second quarter

- BGSU – Jackson Kleather 28-yard field goal, 12:00. Falcons 6–3. Drive: 9 plays, 40 yards, 3:42.
- AKR – Matthew Scrhamm 37-yard field goal, 1:47. Tied 6–6. Drive: 6 plays, 40 yards, 2:08.

Third quarter

- AKR – Matthew Schramm 48-yard field goal, 12:42. Zips 9–6. Drive: 7 plays, 15 yards, 2:09.
- BGSU – Jacob Harris 21-yard pass from Hunter Najm (Jackson Kleather kick), 3:53. Falcons 13–9. Drive: 5 plays, 43 yards, 2:12.
- AKR – Israel Polk 75-yard pass from Ben Finley (Matthew Schramm kick), 3:42. Zips 16–13. Drive: 1 play, 67 yards, 0:11.

Fourth quarter

- AKR – Matthew Schramm 30-yard field goal, 11:43. Zips 19–13. Drive: 11 plays, 67 yards, 4:49.
- BGSU – Jackson Kleather 31-yard field goal, 3:20. Zips 19–16. Drive: 16 plays, 44 yards, 8:19.

Statistics	AKR	BGSU
First downs	20	15
Plays–yards	65–319	71–272
Rushes–yards	37–143	45–134
Passing yards	176	138
Passing: Comp–Att–Int	9–28–1	9–26–2
Turnovers	3	2
Time of possession	25:48	34:12

Team	Category	Player	Statistics
Akron	Passing	Ben Finley	9/26, 176 yards, TD, INT
Akron	Rushing	Jordan Gant	22 carries, 86 yards
Akron	Receiving	Israel Polk	2 receptions, 85 yards, TD
Bowling Green	Passing	Hunter Najm	9/26, 138 yards, TD, 2 INT
Bowling Green	Rushing	Austyn Dendy	27 carries, 110 yards
Bowling Green	Receiving	Jyrin Johnson	3 receptions, 63 yards

=== at UMass ===
Bowling Green Falcons (3–8) at UMass Minutemen (0–11) – Game summary

Quarter	1	2	3	4	Total
Falcons	14	14	7	10	45
Minutemen	0	14	0	0	14

at Warren McGuirk Alumni Stadium • Hadley, Massachusetts

- Date: November 25
- Game time: 4:30 p.m. EST
- Game weather: Overcast • Temperature: 51 °F (11 °C) • Wind: S at 6 miles per hour (9.7 km/h)
- Game attendance: 6,043
- Referee: Andrew Speciale
- TV announcers (ESPNU): Bill Spaulding (play-by-play) and Craig Haubert (analyst)

Game information

First quarter

- BGSU – Austyn Dendy 11-yard pass from Hunter Najm (Jackson Kleather kick), 10:18. Falcons 7–0. Drive: 8 plays, 69 yards, 4:36.
- BGSU – Brennan Ridley 87-yard pass from Hunter Najm (Jackson Kleather kick), 8:18. Falcons 14–0. Drive: 2 plays, 90 yards, 0:42.

Second quarter

- BGSU – Austyn Dendy 8-yard run (Jackson Kleather kick), 13:43. Falcons 21–0. Drive: 2 plays, 11 yards, 0:37.
- BGSU – Blane Cleaver 4-yard pass from Hunter Najm (Jackson Kleather kick), 9:44. Falcons 28–0. Drive: 5 plays, 32 yards, 2:27.
- MASS – Reece Adkins 20-yard pass from Grant Jordan (Derek Morris kick), 3:30. Falcons 28–7. Drive: 13 plays, 73 yards, 6:08.
- MASS – Max Dowling 2-yard pass from Grant Jordan (Derek Morris kick), 0:29. Falcons 28–14. Drive: 8 plays, 80 yards, 1:11.

Third quarter

- BGSU – Austyn Dendy 24-yard run (Jackson Kleather kick), 0:41. Falcons 35–14. Drive: 4 plays, 33 yards, 2:08.

Fourth quarter

- BGSU – Jackson Kleather 42-yard field goal, 7:38. Falcons 38–14. Drive: 8 plays, 33 yards, 5:11.
- BGSU – PaSean Wimberly 1-yard run (Jackson Kleather kick), 1:56. Falcons 45–14. Drive: 7 plays, 55 yards, 4:38.

Statistics	BGSU	MASS
First downs	19	16
Plays–yards	57–406	64–292
Rushes–yards	48–278	29–69
Passing yards	128	223
Passing: Comp–Att–Int	7–9–0	22–35–0
Turnovers	0	1
Time of possession	32:35	27:25

Team	Category	Player	Statistics
Bowling Green	Passing	Hunter Najm	7/9, 128 yards, 3 TD
Bowling Green	Rushing	Austyn Dendy	22 carries, 115 yards, 2 TD
Bowling Green	Receiving	Brennan Ridley	1 reception, 87 yards, TD
UMass	Passing	Grant Jordan	22/35, 223 yards, 2 TD
UMass	Rushing	Elijah Faulkner	8 carries, 36 yards
UMass	Receiving	Jacquon Wilson	10 receptions, 138 yards
