= Troy Evans =

Troy Evans is the name of:

- Troy Evans (actor), American actor
- Troy Evans (American football), American football linebacker
