= Alex Afari =

American football player (born 2004)

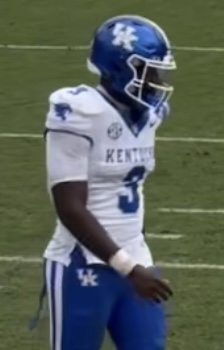
- Afari in 2025

No. 9 – Kentucky Wildcats
- Position: Linebacker
- Class: Fifth Year

Personal information
- Born: May 7, 2004 (age 22); Pordenone, Italy
- Listed height: 6 ft 2 in (1.88 m)
- Listed weight: 227 lb (103 kg)

Career information
- High school: Lakota West (West Chester, Ohio)
- College: Kentucky (2022–present)
- Stats at ESPN

Alex Afari Jr. (born May 7, 2004) is an Italian college football linebacker for the Kentucky Wildcats.

== Early life ==
Afari was born in Pordenone, Italy, and later moved to Ghana before relocating to the United States in 2012. He attended Lakota West High School in West Chester, Ohio. Afari was rated as a three-star recruit and the 69th overall athlete in the class of 2022, receiving offers from school such as Akron, Georgia Tech, Kentucky, Pittsburgh, Virginia, and Michigan State. Ultimately, he committed to play college football for the Kentucky Wildcats.

== College career ==
In the 2022 season opener, Afari recorded six tackles with one and a half being for a loss, and one sack in a victory over Miami Ohio. He finished his freshman season in 2022, appearing in 13 games with three starts, recording 21 tackles with three being for a loss and a sack. In week 5 of the 2023 season, Afari totaled nine tackles with one being for a loss, in an upset win versus Florida. During the 2023 season, he made 12 starts, totaling 49 tackles with five and a half going for a loss, a sack, a pass deflection, a forced fumble, and a fumble recovery. Afari finished the 2024 season with 62 tackles with 11 being for a loss.

== Professional career ==
Pre-draft measurables
Height	Weight	Arm length	Hand span	Wingspan	40-yard dash	Bench press
6 ft 1 3/4 in (1.87 m)	224 lb (102 kg)	32 5/8 in (0.83 m)	8 5/8 in (0.22 m)	6 ft 9 in (2.06 m)	4.78 s	17 reps
All values from Pro Day
