= Quinn Urwiler =

American gridiron football player (born 2001)

No. 45 – Montreal Alouettes
- Position: Linebacker
- Roster status: Practice roster
- CFL status: American

Personal information
- Born: June 19, 2001 (age 25)
- Listed height: 6 ft 0 in (1.83 m)
- Listed weight: 226 lb (103 kg)

Career information
- High school: Batavia (Batavia, Illinois)
- College: North Dakota (2020–2021); Northern Illinois (2022–2025)
- NFL draft: 2026: undrafted

Career history
- Montreal Alouettes (2026–present)

Awards and highlights
- Second-team All-MAC (2025)
- Stats at CFL.ca

Quinton Urwiler (born June 19, 2001) is an American professional football linebacker for the Montreal Alouettes of the Canadian Football League (CFL). He played college football for the North Dakota Fighting Hawks and Northern Illinois Huskies.

== Early life ==
Urwiler was born on June 19, 2001. He attended Batavia High School in Batavia, Illinois. As a junior, Urwiler had 79 tackles, including 19.5 for loss, 17.5 sacks, three interceptions, 11 deflected passes and a fumble returned for a touchdown. On offense, he rushed for 947 yards and 19 touchdowns. In his senior year, Urwiler made 77 tackles, with 15 for loss, 4.5 sacks, three interceptions, 10 passes deflected and 557 rushing yards.

== College career ==
Urwiler played college football for the North Dakota Fighting Hawks from 2020 to 2021 and Northern Illinois Huskies from 2022 to 2025. In 15 games, he had 13 tackles, one sack and one pass deflection. Urwiler then transferred to Northern Illinois University where he played for four seasons. In 42 games, he recorded 188 tackles, including nine for loss, 1.5 sacks, one interception, two pass break ups and one forced fumble. In 2025, Urwiler led the FBS in solo tackles with 71 and earned second-team All-MAC.

== Professional career ==
Pre-draft measurables
Height	Weight	Arm length	Hand span	Wingspan	40-yard dash	10-yard split	20-yard split	20-yard shuttle	Three-cone drill	Vertical jump	Broad jump	Bench press
5 ft 10 in (1.78 m)	230 lb (104 kg)	30 1/8 in (0.77 m)	9 1/8 in (0.23 m)	6 ft 5/8 in (1.84 m)	4.69 s	1.74 s	2.77 s	4.27 s	6.86 s	33.5 in (0.85 m)	10 ft 1 in (3.07 m)	36 reps
All values from Pro day

On July 23, 2026, Urwiler was signed to the practice roster by the Montreal Alouettes of the Canadian Football League (CFL). On September 8, he was elevated to the active roster. On September 12, Urwiler made his CFL debut against the BC Lions, recording one tackle.

== See also ==
- List of NCAA major college football yearly tackles leaders
