= Lakota High School (West Chester, Ohio) =

Coordinates: 39°21′48″N 84°27′12″W

Information
- Established: 1959
- Closed: 1997
- Mascot: Thunderbird

Lakota High School was a high school in the Lakota School District in Butler County, Ohio, United States; it encompasses both West Chester (formerly Union) Township and Liberty Township. The Thunderbird was the Lakota mascot, drawing on the Native American name, T-Birds being a common nickname.

Much of the district was rural when originally established, especially the more northern Liberty Township, but became predominately suburban with population growth and the expansion of metropolitan Cincinnati, Ohio. The school was built in 1959. It eventually split into two high schools in 1997: Lakota East High School and Lakota West High School.

The Lakota High School site, on Tylersville Road in West Chester, Ohio, is now used as both a Freshman School and Early Childhood Center for the Lakota School District.

== Ohio High School Athletic Association State Championships ==
- Boys Basketball – 1992
- Boys Cross Country – 1983
- Girls Cross Country – 1984
- Girls Volleyball - 1994

== Notable alumni ==
- David Collins, producer
- Troy Evans, former NFL player with the Houston Texans and New Orleans Saints
- Brooke Wyckoff, former basketball player for the Florida State Seminoles and now-defunct Orlando Miracle
- Gerri Willis, American television news journalist and former host of The Willis Report
- Ken Lewis (musician), American record producer, mixing engineer, songwriter, and multi-instrumentalist
