= Silas Walters =

American football player (born 2002)

No. 33 – Tampa Bay Buccaneers
- Position: Safety
- Roster status: Practice squad

Personal information
- Born: July 20, 2002 (age 24); West Chester, Ohio, U.S.
- Listed height: 5 ft 11 in (1.80 m)
- Listed weight: 205 lb (93 kg)

Career information
- High school: Lakota West (West Chester)
- College: Miami (OH) (2021–2025)
- NFL draft: 2026: undrafted

Career history
- Baltimore Ravens (2026)*; Tampa Bay Buccaneers (2026–present)*
- * Offseason or practice squad member only

Awards and highlights
- Second-team All-MAC (2025)
- Stats at Pro Football Reference

Silas Walters (born July 20, 2002) is an American professional football safety for the Tampa Bay Buccaneers of the National Football League (NFL). He played college football for the Miami RedHawks.

== Early life ==
Walters was born on July 20, 2002, in West Chester, Ohio. He attended Lakota West High School in West Chester and earned all-conference honors as a senior.

== College career ==
Walters played college football for the Miami RedHawks from 2021 to 2025. He was a walk-on for his first two seasons and became a three-year letterman from 2023. Walters played in 51 games, recording 200 tackles, including 6.5 for loss, two sacks, three interceptions and seven pass break ups. He earned second-team All-MAC honors in 2025.

== Professional career ==
Pre-draft measurables
Height	Weight	Arm length	Hand span	Wingspan	40-yard dash	10-yard split	20-yard split	20-yard shuttle	Three-cone drill	Vertical jump	Broad jump	Bench press
5 ft 11 in (1.80 m)	199 lb (90 kg)	28 3/4 in (0.73 m)	8 7/8 in (0.23 m)	6 ft 8 3/4 in (2.05 m)	4.60 s	1.48 s	2.64 s	4.16 s	6.96 s	38.5 in (0.98 m)	10 ft 4 in (3.15 m)	16 reps
All values from Pro Day

=== Baltimore Ravens ===
After going unselected in the 2026 NFL draft, Walters signed with the Baltimore Ravens as an undrafted free agent. On August 30, he was waived by the team.

=== Tampa Bay Buccaneers ===
On September 2, 2026, Walters was signed to the practice squad of the Tampa Bay Buccaneers.
