= Nathan Voorhis =

American football player (born 2004)

Profile
- Position: Defensive end

Personal information
- Born: April 12, 2004 (age 22); Stroudsburg, Pennsylvania, U.S.
- Listed height: 6 ft 2 in (1.88 m)
- Listed weight: 251 lb (114 kg)

Career information
- High school: Stroudsburg (Stroudsburg, Pennsylvania)
- College: UConn (2022–2023); Bryant (2024); Ball State (2025)
- NFL draft: 2026: undrafted

Career history
- New York Jets (2026)*
- * Offseason or practice squad member only

Awards and highlights
- First-team All-MAC (2025)
- Stats at Pro Football Reference

Nathan Voorhis (born April 12, 2004) is an American professional football defensive end. He played college football for the UConn Huskies, Bryant Bulldogs and Ball State Cardinals.

== Early life ==
Voorhis was born on April 12, 2004 in Stroudsburg, Pennsylvania. He attended Stroudsburg High School, where he earned All-Conference honors.

== College career ==
Voorhis played college football for the UConn Huskies from 2022 to 2023, Bryant Bulldogs in 2024 and Ball State Cardinals in 2025. In two seasons at UConn, he had seven tackles before he entered the transfer portal. Voorhis played one year at Bryant, recording 47 tackles, including 8.5 for loss, five sacks and one forced fumble in 11 games. In December 2024 he committed to transfer to Ball State University. In his last season of eligibility, he had 51 tackles, with 17 for loss, 12 sacks and two forced fumbles. Voorhis was tied for fifth in the nation in sacks and earned first-team All-MAC honors.

== Professional career ==
Pre-draft measurables
Height	Weight	Arm length	Hand span	Wingspan	40-yard dash	10-yard split	20-yard split	20-yard shuttle	Three-cone drill	Vertical jump	Broad jump	Bench press
6 ft 3 in (1.91 m)	251 lb (114 kg)	31 1/8 in (0.79 m)	9 1/2 in (0.24 m)	6 ft 8 3/8 in (2.04 m)	4.79 s	1.70 s	2.72 s	4.59 s	7.45 s	37 in (0.94 m)	9 ft 10 in (3.00 m)	22 reps
All values from Pro Day

After going unselected in the 2026 NFL draft, Voorhis signed with the New York Jets as an undrafted free agent. On August 26, he was waived with an injury settlement. On October 7, Voorhis was signed to the practice squad of the Jets. On November 17, he was released.
