= Emmanuel McNeil-Warren =

American football player (born 2004)

No. 28 – Cleveland Browns
- Position: Safety
- Roster status: Active

Personal information
- Born: January 8, 2004 (age 22); Tampa, Florida, U.S.
- Listed height: 6 ft 3 in (1.91 m)
- Listed weight: 210 lb (95 kg)

Career information
- High school: Lakewood (St. Petersburg, Florida)
- College: Toledo (2022–2025)
- NFL draft: 2026: 2nd round, 58th overall pick

Career history
- Cleveland Browns (2026–present)

Awards and highlights
- Second-team All-American (2025); First-team All-MAC (2025)

Career NFL statistics as of Week 10, 2026
- Tackles: 50
- Pass deflections: 3
- Stats at Pro Football Reference

Emmanuel McNeil-Warren (born January 8, 2004) is an American professional football safety for the Cleveland Browns of the National Football League (NFL). He played college football for the Toledo Rockets and was selected by the Browns in the second round of the 2026 NFL draft.

== Early life ==
McNeil-Warren was born in Tampa, Florida, and later attended Lakewood High School in St. Petersburg, Florida. Coming out of high school, he committed to play college football for the Toledo Rockets.

== College career ==
McNeil-Warren attended University of Toledo, where he played for the Toledo team from 2022 to 2025 under coach Jason Candle.

In his first collegiate season in 2022, he recorded seven tackles and a forced fumble. During the 2023 season, McNeil-Warren tallied 69 tackles with four being for a loss, three pass deflections, two interceptions, and four forced fumbles; he had more forced fumbles than any other player in the conference. In week four of the 2024 season, he totaled seven tackles, a pass deflection, an interception, and a forced fumble in a loss to Western Kentucky. McNeil-Warren finished the 2024 season, totaling 61 tackles and an interception after missing five games with an injury. Heading into the 2025 season, he projects to be selected in the 2026 NFL draft. In week one of the 2025 season, McNeil-Warren recorded eight tackles, a forced fumble, and a fumble recovery against Kentucky. In week two, he notched a fumble recovery, and an interception which he returned 37 yards for a touchdown, in a victory over Western Kentucky.

=== 2022 season ===
Appeared in 13 games, making one start. Contributed primarily on special teams while recording seven total tackles and one forced fumble on the season.

=== 2023 season ===
Finished fourth on the team with 69 total tackles while tying for second with two interceptions. Also recorded three pass breakups and 3.0 tackles for loss. Earned Mid-American Conference West Division Defensive Player of the Week honors following his standout performance against Western Michigan. In that game, he posted a career-high 13 tackles, two pass breakups, a forced fumble, and an interception in his first start against the Broncos.

=== 2024 season ===
Finished fifth on the team with 61 tackles despite missing the final five games due to injury. He recorded a career-high 14 tackles against UMass and added standout performances against Western Kentucky University (seven tackles, interception, forced fumble) and Mississippi State University (10 tackles, 1 pass breakup).

=== 2025 season ===
Earned Second-Team All-America honors from The Sporting News and the Football Writers Association of America, along with a Third-Team selection from the Associated Press and recognition on the Pro Football Focus All-America team. Named G6 Defensive Player of the Year by PFF. First-Team All-MAC selection. Semifinalist for the Jim Thorpe Award, one of just 15 defensive backs nationally selected.

Finished second on the team with 77 tackles while ranking among the national leaders with three forced fumbles and two fumble recoveries. Added one interception, returned for a touchdown against Western Kentucky University. Posted a season-high 13 tackles against Washington State University and had 11 tackles plus a forced fumble and recovery at University of Kentucky, earning East-West Shrine Bowl Breakout Defensive Player of the Week honors. Accepted an invitation to play in the Senior Bowl. Also received invitation to the East–West Shrine Bowl.

== Professional career ==
Pre-draft measurables
Height	Weight	Arm length	Hand span	Wingspan	40-yard dash	10-yard split	20-yard split	Vertical jump	Broad jump
6 ft 3 1/2 in (1.92 m)	201 lb (91 kg)	32 1/8 in (0.82 m)	9 1/4 in (0.23 m)	6 ft 6 1/4 in (1.99 m)	4.52 s	1.58 s	2.61 s	35.5 in (0.90 m)	10 ft 2 in (3.10 m)
All values from NFL Combine

McNeil-Warren was selected by the Cleveland Browns in the second round with the 58th overall pick of the 2026 NFL draft.
