= Lakota West High School =

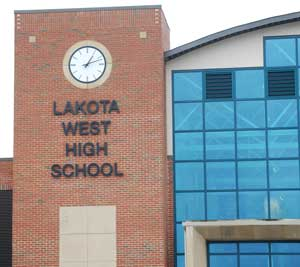

Location
- 8940 Union Centre Boulevard; West Chester, Ohio 45069; United States; 39°19′49″N 84°25′52″W

Information
- Type: Public
- Motto: "As Always, Go Firebirds"
- Established: 1997
- School district: Lakota
- Superintendent: Ashley Whitley
- Principal: Scott Laman
- Teaching staff: 98.76 (FTE)
- Grades: 9–12
- Student to teacher ratio: 28.81
- Colors: Red, white and black
- Slogan: Working Together for Excellence and Opportunity
- Fight song: "Fight On"
- Athletics conference: Greater Miami Conference
- Sports: football, baseball, soccer, dance, basketball, cheer, golf, tennis, cross country, volleyball
- Mascot: Firebird
- Team name: Firebirds
- Accreditation: North Central Association of Colleges and Schools
- Newspaper: The West Press
- Website: www.lakotawesthigh.com

Lakota West High School is a four-year, public high school in West Chester Township, a suburb of Cincinnati, Ohio, United States. It is a member of the Lakota Local School District, which comprises both West Chester Township and Liberty Township. The district was originally unified under one high school, Lakota High School, until 1997 when the district expanded and formed two new high schools – Lakota West and Lakota East. Enrollment for Lakota West exceeds 2,900 students.

The school's radio station, WLHS 89.9 FM, is a remnant of the former high school and is staffed by students from both Lakota East and Lakota West.

The OHSAA Division 1 school's mascot is the Firebird, derived from the former district's mascot, the Thunderbird, and the school colors are red and white with black trim. Sports teams compete as a member of the Greater Miami Conference (GMC). The school year is divided into two semesters with two quarters each.

== Athletics ==
Lakota West is a member of the Greater Miami Conference in the Ohio High School Athletic Association. Lakota West's athletic teams are known as the Firebirds. The school's primary rival is the neighboring Lakota East High School.

Team State Championships
Year	Sport
2021-22	Softball
2020-21	Boys' Cross Country
2019-20	Girls' Soccer
2014-15	Girls' Basketball
2006-07	Girls' Golf
2006-07	Baseball
2000-01	Boys' Golf
1999-00	Girls' Soccer

== Notable alumni ==
- Alex Afari, college football linebacker for the Kentucky Wildcats
- George Asafo-Adjei, NFL offensive tackle
- Jyaire Brown, college football defensive back for the Southern Miss Golden Eagles
- John Conner, NFL fullback
- Nick Hagglund, MLS defender
- Jordan Hicks, NFL linebacker
- Mitra Jouhari, comedian and writer
- Ryan Kelly, NFL offensive lineman
- Jackson Kuwatch, NFL linebacker for the Carolina Panthers
- Jacob May, MLB outfielder
- Marissa Steen, professional golfer
- Tegra Tshabola, college football offensive guard for the Kentucky Wildcats
- Paul Walters, MLS goalkeeper
- Silas Walters, NFL safety for the Tampa Bay Buccaneers
