= Avery Smith =

American football player (born 2004)

No. 27 – Seattle Seahawks
- Position: Cornerback
- Roster status: Active

Personal information
- Born: January 1, 2004 (age 22); East Point, Georgia
- Listed height: 5 ft 10 in (1.78 m)
- Listed weight: 196 lb (89 kg)

Career information
- High school: Riverwood (Sandy Springs, Georgia)
- College: Toledo (2022–2025)
- NFL draft: 2026: undrafted

Career history
- Los Angeles Chargers (2026)*; Seattle Seahawks (2026–present)
- * Offseason or practice squad member only

Awards and highlights
- 2× Second-team All-MAC (2024, 2025)
- Stats at Pro Football Reference

Avery Smith (born January 1, 2004) is an American professional football cornerback for the Seattle Seahawks of the National Football League (NFL). He played college football for the Toledo Rockets.

== Early life ==
Smith attended Riverwood International Charter School in Sandy Springs, Georgia. He played as quarterback, throwing for 3,208 yards, running for 913 yards, and responsible for 44 total touchdowns as a senior. Smith was named to the All-Region team for 7-6A in 2021 and a Georgia Mr. Football finalist. He was a three-star recruit out of high school and committed to play college football for University of Toledo.

== College career ==
Smith played college football for the Toledo Rockets from 2022 to 2025. He was originally recruited as a quarterback but would have been third- or fourth-string on the depth chart. Smith made the switch to cornerback and played on special teams his first two years.

In 2024, he became a starter recording 58 tackles, including 0.5 tackles for loss, two interceptions and 14 passes deflected. Smith was tied for second in the nation in pass breakups and earned Second-team All-MAC honors.

In his senior season, he registered 42 tackles, including five tackles for loss, one interception, 11 passes deflected and one forced fumble. In the 2025 Boca Raton Bowl, Smith returned a blocked extra point back for a two-point conversion. He was again named to the second-team All-MAC team.

== Professional career ==
Pre-draft measurables
Height	Weight	Arm length	Hand span	Wingspan	40-yard dash	10-yard split	20-yard split	20-yard shuttle	Three-cone drill	Vertical jump	Broad jump	Bench press
5 ft 10 1/2 in (1.79 m)	196 lb (89 kg)	29 3/8 in (0.75 m)	8 3/8 in (0.21 m)	6 ft 0 1/2 in (1.84 m)	4.54 s	1.61 s	2.63 s	4.34 s	7.03 s	38.5 in (0.98 m)	10 ft 5 in (3.18 m)	14 reps
All values from NFL Combine/Pro Day

=== Los Angeles Chargers ===
After going undrafted in the 2026 NFL draft, Smith signed with the Los Angeles Chargers as an undrafted free agent.

=== Seattle Seahawks ===
On August 30, 2026, Smith was traded to the Seattle Seahawks in exchange for a 2027 sixth-round pick.

== Career statistics ==
=== College ===
Legend
**Bold**	Career high

Year	Team	Games		Tackles					Interceptions				Fumbles		
Year	Team	GP	GS	Solo	Ast	Cmb	TfL	Sck	Int	Yds	TD	PD	FR	FF	TD
2022	Toledo	11	0	6	6	12	2.0	0.0	0	**0**	0	0	0	0	0
2023	Toledo	14	0	9	6	15	0.0	0.0	0	**0**	0	1	0	0	0
2024	Toledo	13	13	**40**	**18**	**58**	0.5	0.0	**2**	**0**	0	**14**	0	0	0
2025	Toledo	13	13	31	11	42	**5.0**	0.0	1	-3	0	11	0	**1**	0
Career		51	26	86	41	127	7.5	0.0	3	-3	0	26	0	1	0
