= 2025 Mid-American Conference football season =

- League: NCAA Division I Football Bowl Subdivision
- Sport: Football
- Duration: August 29 – December 7
- Teams: 13

Regular season
- Season champions: Western Michigan
- Runners-up: Miami (OH), Toledo, Ohio
- Season MVP: Nadame Tucker

MAC Championship Game
- Date: December 6, 2025
- Venue: Ford Field, Detroit, Michigan
- Champions: Western Michigan
- Runners-up: Miami (OH)

Seasons
- 2024 2026

2025 Mid-American Conference football standings
| | Conf. | | | Overall |
| Team | W | | L | W | | L |
|---|---|---|---|---|---|---|
| Western Michigan y$ | 7 | – | 1 | 10 | – | 4 |
| Miami (OH) y | 6 | – | 2 | 7 | – | 7 |
| Ohio | 6 | – | 2 | 9 | – | 4 |
| Toledo | 6 | – | 2 | 8 | – | 5 |
| Central Michigan | 5 | – | 3 | 7 | – | 6 |
| Akron* | 4 | – | 4 | 5 | – | 7 |
| Buffalo | 4 | – | 4 | 5 | – | 7 |
| Kent State | 4 | – | 4 | 5 | – | 7 |
| Eastern Michigan | 3 | – | 5 | 4 | – | 8 |
| Ball State | 3 | – | 5 | 4 | – | 8 |
| Bowling Green | 2 | – | 6 | 4 | – | 8 |
| Northern Illinois | 2 | – | 6 | 3 | – | 9 |
| UMass | 0 | – | 8 | 0 | – | 12 |
Championship: Western Michigan 23, Miami (OH) 13
$ – Conference champion; y – Championship game participant; * Ineligible for postseason play due to low APR score

The 2025 Mid-American Conference football season was the 80th season for the Mid-American Conference (MAC), as part of the 2025 NCAA Division I FBS football season. Non-conference play began on August 28. Conference play began on September 13 and concluded with the MAC championship game on December 6 at Ford Field in Detroit, Michigan. Just as it was in 2024, the MAC did not have divisions. The Championship game featured the two teams with the best conference records. The MAC saw its first change in its football membership since 2015, and the first change in its core membership since 2005, with the addition of UMass. This was Northern Illinois' last season as it has joined the Mountain West Conference for football in 2026.

Western Michigan finished its conference season with a 7–1 conference record. It finished the regular season in sole possession of first place in the MAC standings and earned the MAC regular-season title. Miami finished in a three-way tie for second place with Ohio and Toledo at 6–2 in the conference. Miami won the tiebreaker to advance to the championship game in spite of losing to both teams during the regular season. In the championship game, Western Michigan avenged their only regular season conference loss with a 23–13 victory over Miami.

Western Michigan's defensive end Nadame Tucker was the Defensive Player of the Year and won the Vern Smith Leadership Award. Western Michigan swept the major awards as quarterback Broc Lowry won Offensive Player of the Year and Lance Taylor won Coach of the Year.

== Preseason ==
The MAC Football Kickoff was held on Thursday, July 24, 2025, at the Ford Field in Detroit, Michigan from 9:00 am EDT to 1:30 pm EDT. Commissioner Jon Steinbrecher spoke. Each team had their head coach and a student athlete from both the offense and the defense available to speak to the media.

- Akron – Head Coach Joe Moorhead; Ben Finley, R-Sr., QB; Daymon David, R-Sr., S
- Ball State – Head Coach Mike Uremovich; Kiael Kelly, R-Sr., QB; Darin Conley, R-So., DT
- Bowling Green – Head Coach Eddie George; Drew Pyne, Grad., QB; Eriq George, Jr., DE
- Buffalo – Head Coach Pete Lembo, Al-Jay Henderson, Sr., RB; Red Murdock, Gr., LB
- Central Michigan – Head Coach Matt Drinkall; Joe Labas, R-Sr., QB; Jordan Kwiatkowski, Sr., LB
- Eastern Michigan – Head Coach Chris Creighton; Mickey Rewolinski, Gr., OL; Jefferson Adam, Sr., DL
- Kent State – Interim Head Coach Mark Carney; Da’Shawn Martin, So., WR; Tevin Tucker, R-So., S
- UMass – Head Coach Joe Harasymiak; Rocko Griffin, R-Jr., RB; Malcolm Greene, DB
- Miami (OH) – Head Coach Chuck Martin; Dequan Finn, 6th-Sr., QB; Silas Walters, R-Sr., DB
- Northern Illinois – Head Coach Thomas Hammock; Evan Malcore, R-Jr., OT; Jalonnie Williams, R-Sr., DE
- Ohio – Head Coach Brian Smith; Parker Navarro, Grad., QB; DJ Walker, R-So., S
- Toledo – Head Coach Jason Candle; Tucker Gleason, Sr., QB; Emmanuel McNeil-Warren, Sr., S
- Western Michigan – Head Coach Lance Taylor; Jalen Buckley, R-Jr., RB; Tate Hallock, Grad., S

=== Preseason coaches poll ===
On July 24, the MAC announced the preseason coaches poll. Toledo was named the preseason favorite to win the conference while both of last year's finalist, Ohio and Miami, also received votes to win the championship.

| Predicted finish | Team | Points (1st place votes) |
|---|---|---|
| 1 | Toledo | 135 (7) |
| 2 | Miami (OH) | 131 (3) |
| 3 | Ohio | 123 (3) |
| 4 | Buffalo | 115 |
| 5 | Northern Illinois | 94 |
| 6 | Bowling Green | 81 |
| 7 | Western Michigan | 71 |
| 8 | Eastern Michigan | 68 |
| 9 | Central Michigan | 65 |
| 10 | Ball State | 41 |
| T-11 | Akron | 39 |
| T-11 | UMass | 39 |
| 13 | Kent State | 12 |

Predicted MAC champion
| Rank | Team | Votes |
| 1 | Toledo | 6 |
| 2 | Miami (OH) | 4 |
| 3 | Ohio | 3 |

=== Individual award preseason watchlists ===
| Award | Head coach/player | School | Position | Year | Ref |
|---|---|---|---|---|---|
| Lott Trophy | none | | | | |
| Dodd Trophy | none | | Head coach | -- | |
| Maxwell Award | Al-Jay Henderson | Buffalo | RB | Sr. | |
| Maxwell Award | Parker Navarro | Ohio | QB | Gr. | |
| Maxwell Award | Tucker Gleason | Toledo | QB | Sr. | |
| Maxwell Award | Jalen Buckley | Western Michigan | RB | So. | |
| Outland Trophy | none | | | | |
| Bronko Nagurski Trophy | Red Murdock | Buffalo | LB | Gr. | |
| Butkus Award | Jordan Kwiatkowski | Central Michigan | LB | Jr. | |
| Jim Thorpe Award | Tank Pearson | Ohio | CB | Gr. | |
| Jim Thorpe Award | DJ Walker | Ohio | S | RS-So. | |
| Jim Thorpe Award | Avery Smith | Toledo | CB | Sr. | |
| Paul Hornung Award | Ty Harding | UMass | WR | RS-So. | |
| Paul Hornung Award | Trayvon Rudolph | Toledo | WR | Sr. | |
| Paul Hornung Award | Victor Snow | Buffalo | WR | RS-Jr. | |
| Wuerffel Trophy | Keylen Davis | Akron | T | RS-Jr. | |
| Wuerffel Trophy | Kiael Kelly | Ball State | QB | RS-Sr. | |
| Wuerffel Trophy | Drew Pyne | Bowling Green | QB | Gr. | |
| Wuerffel Trophy | Red Murdock | Buffalo | LB | Gr. | |
| Wuerffel Trophy | Michael Heldman | Central Michigan | DL | RS-Sr. | |
| Wuerffel Trophy | Jefferson Adam | Eastern Michigan | DL | Sr. | |
| Wuerffel Trophy | Mattheus Carroll | Kent State | DL | Gr. | |
| Wuerffel Trophy | Brock Taylor | UMass | OL | Fr. | |
| Wuerffel Trophy | Abiathar Curry | Northern Illinois | OL | RS-Jr. | |
| Wuerffel Trophy | Matt Hofer | Toledo | OL | RS-Fr. | |
| Wuerffel Trophy | Tyson Lee | Western Michigan | DL | Jr. | |
| Lou Groza Award | Dom Dzioban | Miami (OH) | PK | RS-Sr. | |
| Ray Guy Award | John Henderson | Bowling Green | P | Jr. | |
| Jet Award | none | | | | |

| Award | Head coach/player | School | Position | Year | Ref |
|---|---|---|---|---|---|
| Walter Camp Award | Al-Jay Henderson | Buffalo | RB | Sr. | |
| Walter Camp Award | Parker Navarro | Ohio | QB | Gr. | |
| Walter Camp Award | Dequan Finn | Miami (OH) | QB | Sr. | |
| Doak Walker Award | none | | RB | | |
| Patrick Mannelly Award | none | | LS | | |
| Biletnikoff Award | Junior Vandeross III | Toledo | WR | Jr. | |
| Davey O'Brien Award | Parker Navarro | Ohio | QB | Gr. | |
| Davey O'Brien Award | Tucker Gleason | Toledo | QB | Sr. | |
| John Mackey Award | Blake Bosma | Western Michigan | TE | RS-Sr. | |
| John Mackey Award | Mason Williams | Ohio | TE | RS-So. | |
| Rimington Trophy | none | | C | | |
| Bednarik Award | Red Murdock | Buffalo | LB | Gr. | |
| Bednarik Award | Kobe Stewart | Buffalo | DE | RS-Sr. | |
| Bednarik Award | DJ Walker | Ohio | S | RS-So. | |
| Bednarik Award | Avery Smith | Toledo | CB | Sr. | |
| Rotary Lombardi Award | Jordan Kwiatkowski | Central Michigan | LB | Sr. | |
| Rotary Lombardi Award | Kobe Stewart | Buffalo | DE | RS-Sr. | |
| Manning Award | Tucker Gleason | Toledo | QB | Sr. | |
| Manning Award | Parker Navarro | Ohio | QB | Gr. | |
| Polynesian College Football Player Of The Year Award | none | | | | |
| Johnny Unitas Golden Arm Award | Tucker Gleason | Toledo | QB | Sr. | |
| Earl Campbell Tyler Rose Award | none | | | | |

== Coaches ==
=== Coaching changes ===
The MAC entered the 2025 season with six head coaching changes from 2024.

==== Ball State ====
Ball State head coach Mike Neu was fired on November 16 with two games remaining in the 2024 season. Neu had 40 wins and 63 losses in nine seasons. He won the MAC Championship in 2020 It was his only winning season. Colin Johnson succeeded him as interim head coach. On December 4, Ball State named Butler head coach Mike Uremovich as the new head coach.

==== Bowling Green ====
On February 28, 2025, Scot Loeffler resigned from the head coach position to become the quarterbacks coach of the Philadelphia Eagles in the NFL. On March 9, Bowling Green named Tennessee State head coach Eddie George as the new head coach for 2025.

==== Central Michigan ====
Central Michigan head coach Jim McElwain announced on November 20 that he would retire at the end of the 2024 season He retired with a 33–36 at the school. On December 9, 2024, Army assistant coach Matt Drinkall was hired as the next head coach.

==== Kent State ====
On March 27, 2025, Kent State placed Kenni Burns on administrative leave with offensive coordinator Mark Carney taking over day-to-day operations. Burns was fired on April 11 after an undisclosed investigation and named Carney as interim head coach for the 2025 season. Burns overall record at Kent State was 1–23. On October 30, Carney was promoted to permanent head coach.

==== Ohio ====
On December 7, 2024 Ohio head coach Tim Albin resigned after winning the 2024 MAC Football Championship Game to become the head coach at Charlotte Albin exited the team bus on the way back to campus to accept the position. Associate Head Coach Brian Smith was named the interim head coach for the 2024 Cure Bowl. Ohio named him the permanent head coach on December 18.

==== UMass ====
On November 18, 2024, Don Brown was fired after a 2–8 record to start the season and a 6–28 overall record. This was his second stint at the school. During that stint the Minutemen had a record of 6–28. On December 4, 2024, they hired Joe Harasymiak as the new head coach.

=== Head coaching records ===
| Team | Head coach | Previous Job | Years at school | Record at school | MAC record | MAC titles |
|---|---|---|---|---|---|---|
| Akron | Joe Moorhead | Oregon (offensive coordinator) | 3 | 8–28 (.222) | 5–19 (.208) | 0 |
| Ball State | Mike Uremovich | Butler | 1 | 0–0 (–) | 0–0 (–) | 0 |
| Bowling Green | Eddie George | Tennessee State | 1 | 0–0 (–) | 0–0 (–) | 0 |
| Buffalo | Pete Lembo | South Carolina (associate head coach/special teams coordinator) | 2 | 9–4 (.692) | 6–2 (.750) | 0 |
| Central Michigan | Matt Drinkall | Army (OL coach) | 1 | 0–0 (–) | 0–0 (–) | 0 |
| Eastern Michigan | Chris Creighton | Drake | 12 | 57–75 (.432) | 33–53 (.384) | 0 |
| Kent State | Mark Carney† | Kent State (offensive coordinator) | 1 | 0–0 (–) | 0–0 (–) | 0 |
| Miami (OH) | Chuck Martin | Notre Dame (offensive coordinator/QB coach) | 11 | 65–67 (.492) | 51–32 (.614) | 2 |
| Northern Illinois | Thomas Hammock | Baltimore Ravens (running backs coach) | 7 | 32–38 (.457) | 21–25 (.457) | 1 |
| Ohio | Brian Smith | Ohio (associate head coach/offensive coordinator) | 1 | 1–0 (1.000) | 0–0 (–) | 0 |
| Toledo | Jason Candle | Toledo (offensive coordinator) | 10 | 73–40 (.646) | 47–23 (.671) | 2 |
| UMass | Joe Harasymiak | Rutgers (defensive coordinator) | 1 | 0–0 (–) | 0–0 (–) | 0 |
| Western Michigan | Lance Taylor | Louisville (offensive coordinator) | 3 | 10–15 (.400) | 8–8 (.500) | 0 |

Source -

†Interim Coach

== Rankings ==
| | | Pre | Wk 1 | Wk 2 | Wk 3 | Wk 4 | Wk 5 | Wk 6 | Wk 7 | Wk 8 | Wk 9 | Wk 10 | Wk 11 | Wk 12 | Wk 13 | Wk 14 | Wk 15 | Wk 16 | Final |
|---|---|---|---|---|---|---|---|---|---|---|---|---|---|---|---|---|---|---|---|
| Akron | AP | | | | | | | | | | | | | | | | | | |
| Akron | C | | | | | | | | | | | | | | | | | | |
| Akron | CFP | Not released | | | | | | | | | | | | | | | | | |
| Ball State | AP | | | | | | | | | | | | | | | | | | |
| Ball State | C | | | | | | | | | | | | | | | | | | |
| Ball State | CFP | Not released | | | | | | | | | | | | | | | | | |
| Bowling Green | AP | | | | | | | | | | | | | | | | | | |
| Bowling Green | C | | | | | | | | | | | | | | | | | | |
| Bowling Green | CFP | Not released | | | | | | | | | | | | | | | | | |
| Buffalo | AP | | | | | | | | | | | | | | | | | | |
| Buffalo | C | RV | NR | | | | | | | | | | | | | | | | |
| Buffalo | CFP | Not released | | | | | | | | | | | | | | | | | |
| Central Michigan | AP | | | | | | | | | | | | | | | | | | |
| Central Michigan | C | | | | | | | | | | | | | | | | | | |
| Central Michigan | CFP | Not released | | | | | | | | | | | | | | | | | |
| Eastern Michigan | AP | | | | | | | | | | | | | | | | | | |
| Eastern Michigan | C | | | | | | | | | | | | | | | | | | |
| Eastern Michigan | CFP | Not released | | | | | | | | | | | | | | | | | |
| Kent State | AP | | | | | | | | | | | | | | | | | | |
| Kent State | C | | | | | | | | | | | | | | | | | | |
| Kent State | CFP | Not released | | | | | | | | | | | | | | | | | |
| Miami (OH) | AP | | | | | | | | | | | | | | | | | | |
| Miami (OH) | C | | | | | | | | | | | | | | | | | | |
| Miami (OH) | CFP | Not released | | | | | | | | | | | | | | | | | |
| Northern Illinois | AP | | | | | | | | | | | | | | | | | | |
| Northern Illinois | C | | | | | | | | | | | | | | | | | | |
| Northern Illinois | CFP | Not released | | | | | | | | | | | | | | | | | |
| Ohio | AP | | | | | | | | | | | | | | | | | | |
| Ohio | C | | | | | | | | | | | | | | | | | | |
| Ohio | CFP | Not released | | | | | | | | | | | | | | | | | |
| Toledo | AP | RV | NR | | | | | | | | | | | | | | | | |
| Toledo | C | | | | | | | | | | | | | | | | | | |
| Toledo | CFP | Not released | | | | | | | | | | | | | | | | | |
| UMass | AP | | | | | | | | | | | | | | | | | | |
| UMass | C | | | | | | | | | | | | | | | | | | |
| UMass | CFP | Not released | | | | | | | | | | | | | | | | | |
| Western Michigan | AP | | | | | | | | | | | | | | | | | RV | RV |
| Western Michigan | C | | | | | | | | | | | | | | | | | RV | RV |
| Western Michigan | CFP | Not released | | | | | | | | | | | | | | | | | |

Legend
| | Improvement in ranking |
| | Drop in ranking |
| | Not ranked previous week |
| | No change in ranking from previous week |
| RV | Received votes but were not ranked in Top 25 of poll |
| т | Tied with team above or below also with this symbol |

AP -

Coaches -

CFP -

== Schedule ==
Index to colors and formatting
MAC member won
MAC member lost
MAC teams in **bold**

All times Eastern time.

=== Week 1 ===
| Date | Time | Visiting team | Home team | Site | TV | Result | Attendance | Ref. |
|---|---|---|---|---|---|---|---|---|
| August 28 | 6:00 p.m. | **Ohio** | Rutgers | SHI Stadium • Piscataway, NJ | BTN | **L** 31–34 | 46,907 | |
| August 28 | 6:00 p.m. | Lafayette | **Bowling Green** | Doyt Perry Stadium • Bowling Green, OH | ESPN+ | **W** 26–7 | 19,328 | |
| August 28 | 7:00 p.m. | Wyoming | **Akron** | InfoCision Stadium • Akron, OH | ESPN+ | **L** 0–10 | 9,138 | |
| August 28 | 8:00 p.m. | **Buffalo** | Minnesota | Huntington Bank Stadium • Minneapolis, MN | FS1 | **L** 10–23 | 47,774 | |
| August 28 | 9:00 p.m. | **Miami (OH)** | Wisconsin | Camp Randall Stadium • Madison, WI | BTN | **L** 0–17 | 65,952 | |
| August 29 | 7:00 p.m. | **Western Michigan** | Michigan State | Spartan Stadium • East Lansing, MI | FS1 | **L** 6–23 | 71,657 | |
| August 29 | 10:30 p.m. | **Central Michigan** | San Jose State | CEFCU Stadium • San Jose, CA | FS1 | **W** 16–14 | 14,877 | |
| August 30 | 12:00 p.m. | **Ball State** | Purdue | Ross–Ade Stadium • West Lafayette, IN | BTN | **L** 0–31 | 53,994 | |
| August 30 | 12:00 p.m. | Merrimack | **Kent State** | Dix Stadium • Kent, OH | ESPN+ | **W** 21–17 | 8,647 | |
| August 30 | 12:45 p.m. | **Toledo** | Kentucky | Kroger Field • Lexington, KY | SECN | **L** 16–24 | 56,457 | |
| August 30 | 3:30 p.m. | Temple | **UMass** | McGuirk Alumni Stadium • Hadley, MA | ESPN+ | **L** 10–42 | 11,565 | |
| August 30 | 3:30 p.m. | Holy Cross | **Northern Illinois** | Huskie Stadium • DeKalb, IL | ESPN+ | **W** 19–17 | 10,569 | |
| August 30 | 8:00 p.m. | **Eastern Michigan** | Texas State | UFCU Stadium • San Marcos, TX | ESPN+ | **L** 27–52 | 21,082 | |
^{#}Rankings from AP Poll released prior to game. All times are in Eastern Time.

=== Week 2 ===
| Date | Time | Visiting team | Home team | Site | TV | Result | Attendance | Ref. |
|---|---|---|---|---|---|---|---|---|
| September 5 | 7:30 p.m. | **Northern Illinois** | Maryland | SECU Stadium • College Park, MD | BTN | **L** 9–20 | 35,331 | |
| September 6 | 12:00 p.m. | **Kent State** | No. 24 Texas Tech | Jones AT&T Stadium • Lubbock, TX | TNT | **L** 14–62 | 60,229 | |
| September 6 | 12:00 p.m. | **Central Michigan** | Pittsburgh | Acrisure Stadium • Pittsburgh, PA | ESPNU | **L** 17–45 | 48,424 | |
| September 6 | 3:30 p.m. | **Bowling Green** | Cincinnati | Nippert Stadium • Cincinnati, OH | ESPN+ | **L** 20–34 | 35,421 | |
| September 6 | 3:30 p.m. | North Texas | **Western Michigan** | Waldo Stadium • Kalamazoo, MI | ESPN+ | **L** 30–33 ^{OT} | 20,051 | |
| September 6 | 3:30 p.m. | Saint Francis (PA) | **Buffalo** | UB Stadium • Amherst, NY | ESPN+ | **W** 45–6 | 15,740 | |
| September 6 | 3:30 p.m. | Bryant | **UMass** | McGuirk Alumni Stadium • Hadley, MA | ESPN+ | **L** 26–27 | 3,714 | |
| September 6 | 4:00 p.m. | West Virginia | **Ohio** | Peden Stadium • Athens, OH | ESPNU | **W** 17–10 | 26,740 | |
| September 6 | 4:30 p.m. | **Miami (OH)** | Rutgers | SHI Stadium • Piscataway, NJ | Peacock | **L** 17–45 | 45,981 | |
| September 6 | 7:00 p.m. | Western Kentucky | **Toledo** | Glass Bowl • Toledo, OH | ESPN+ | **W** 45–21 | 24,138 | |
| September 6 | 7:00 p.m. | LIU | **Eastern Michigan** | Rynearson Stadium • Ypsilanti, MI | ESPN+ | **L** 23–28 | 15,313 | |
| September 6 | 7:30 p.m. | **Ball State** | Auburn | Jordan-Hare Stadium • Auburn, AL | ESPNU | **L** 3–42 | 88,043 | |
| September 6 | 7:30 p.m. | **Akron** | Nebraska | Memorial Stadium • Lincoln, NE | BTN | **L** 0–68 | 86,439 | |
^{#}Rankings from AP Poll released prior to game. All times are in Eastern Time.

=== Week 3 ===
| Date | Time | Visiting team | Home team | Site | TV | Result | Attendance | Ref. |
|---|---|---|---|---|---|---|---|---|
| September 13 | 12:00 p.m. | **Central Michigan** | No. 23 Michigan | Michigan Stadium • Ann Arbor, MI | BTN | **L** 3–63 | 110,740 | |
| September 13 | 12:00 p.m. | **Buffalo** | **Kent State** | Dix Stadium • Kent, OH | CBSSN | **UB** 31–28 | 11,833 | |
| September 13 | 2:00 p.m. | No. 23 (FCS) New Hampshire | **Ball State** | Scheumann Stadium • Muncie, IN | ESPN+ | **W** 34–29 | 10,512 | |
| September 13 | 3:30 p.m. | Morgan State | **Toledo** | Glass Bowl • Toledo, OH | ESPN+ | **W** 60–0 | 22,846 | |
| September 13 | 5:00 p.m. | Liberty | **Bowling Green** | Doyt Perry Stadium • Bowling Green, OH | ESPN+ | **W** 23–13 | 23,159 | |
| September 13 | 7:00 p.m. | **Western Michigan** | No. 9 Illinois | Memorial Stadium • Champaign, IL | FS1 | **L** 0–38 | 60,670 | |
| September 13 | 7:00 p.m. | **Ohio** | No. 1 Ohio State | Ohio Stadium • Columbus, OH | Peacock | **L** 9–37 | 105,765 | |
| September 13 | 7:30 p.m. | **Eastern Michigan** | Kentucky | Kroger Field • Lexington, KY | ESPNU | **L** 23–48 | 58,489 | |
| September 13 | 7:30 p.m. | **UMass** | Iowa | Kinnick Stadium • Iowa City, IA | BTN | **L** 7–47 | 69,250 | |
| September 13 | 8:30 p.m. | **Akron** | UAB | Protective Stadium • Birmingham, AL | ESPN+ | **L** 28–31 | 17,823 | |
^{#}Rankings from AP Poll released prior to game. All times are in Eastern Time.

=== Week 4 ===
| Date | Time | Visiting team | Home team | Site | TV | Result | Attendance | Ref. |
|---|---|---|---|---|---|---|---|---|
| September 20 | 12:00 p.m. | **Bowling Green** | Louisville | L&N Federal Credit Union Stadium • Louisville, KY | ACCN | **L** 17–40 | 49,482 | |
| September 20 | 12:00 p.m. | UNLV | **Miami (OH)** | Yager Stadium • Oxford, OH | ESPNU | **L** 38–41 | 12,625 | |
| September 20 | 1:00 p.m. | Wagner | **Central Michigan** | Kelly/Shorts Stadium • Mount Pleasant, MI | ESPN+ | **W** 49–10 | 18,787 | |
| September 20 | 3:30 p.m. | **Kent State** | No. 7 Florida State | Doak Campbell Stadium • Tallahassee, FL | ACCN | **L** 10–66 | 67,277 | |
| September 20 | 3:30 p.m. | **Ball State** | UConn | Rentschler Field • East Hartford, CT | CBSSN | **L** 25–31 | 25,025 | |
| September 20 | 3:30 p.m. | Louisiana | **Eastern Michigan** | Rynearson Stadium • Ypsilanti, MI | ESPN+ | **W** 34–31 | 18,371 | |
| September 20 | 3:30 p.m. | Troy | **Buffalo** | UB Stadium • Amherst, NY | ESPN+ | **L** 17–21 | 12,068 | |
| September 20 | 3:30 p.m. | **Toledo** | **Western Michigan** | Waldo Stadium • Kalamazoo, MI | ESPN+ | **WMU** 14–13 | 20,744 | |
| September 20 | 3:30 p.m. | Gardner–Webb | **Ohio** | Peden Stadium • Athens, OH | ESPN+ | **W** 52–35 | 22,312 | |
| September 20 | 4:15 p.m. | **Northern Illinois** | Mississippi State | Davis Wade Stadium • Starkville, MS | SECN | **L** 10–38 | 45,803 | |
| September 20 | 6:00 p.m. | Duquesne | **Akron** | InfoCision Stadium • Akron, OH | ESPN+ | **W** 51–7 | 8,117 | |
^{#}Rankings from AP Poll released prior to game. All times are in Eastern Time.

=== Week 5 ===
| Date | Time | Visiting team | Home team | Site | TV | Result | Attendance | Ref. |
|---|---|---|---|---|---|---|---|---|
| September 27 | 12:00 p.m. | **Bowling Green** | **Ohio** | Peden Stadium • Athens, OH | CBSSN | **OHIO** 35–20 | 20,027 | |
| September 27 | 12:00 p.m. | **Eastern Michigan** | **Central Michigan** | Kelly/Shorts Stadium • Mount Pleasant, MI (Michigan MAC Trophy, rivalry) | ESPN+ | **CMU** 24–13 | 28,605 | |
| September 27 | 3:30 p.m. | San Diego State | **Northern Illinois** | Huskie Stadium • DeKalb, Illinois | ESPN+ | **L** 3–6 | 13,512 | |
| September 27 | 3:30 p.m. | Lindenwood | **Miami (OH)** | Yager Stadium • Oxford, OH | ESPN+ | **W** 38–0 | 10,504 | |
| September 27 | 3:30 p.m. | UConn | **Buffalo** | UB Stadium • Amherst, NY | ESPN+ | **L** 17–20 | 12,717 | |
| September 27 | 3:30 p.m. | **Akron** | **Toledo** | Glass Bowl • Toledo, OH | ESPN+ | **TOL** 45–3 | 24,535 | |
| September 27 | 6:30 p.m. | No. 6 (FCS) Rhode Island | **Western Michigan** | Waldo Stadium • Kalamazoo, MI | ESPN+ | **W** 47–14 | 20,191 | |
| September 27 | 7:30 p.m. | **UMass** | No. 20 Missouri | Faurot Field • Columbia, MO | ESPNU | **L** 6–42 | 57,321 | |
^{#}Rankings from AP Poll released prior to game. All times are in Eastern Time.

=== Week 6 ===
| Date | Time | Visiting team | Home team | Site | TV | Result | Attendance | Ref. |
|---|---|---|---|---|---|---|---|---|
| October 4 | 12:00 p.m. | Ohio | **Ball State** | Scheumann Stadium • Muncie, IN | CBSSN | **BSU** 20–14 | 8,427 | |
| October 4 | 2:30 p.m. | Western Michigan | **UMass** | McGuirk Alumni Stadium • Hadley, MA | ESPN+ | **WMU** 21–3 | 10,014 | |
| October 4 | 3:30 p.m. | Central Michigan | **Akron** | InfoCision Stadium • Akron, OH | ESPN+ | **AKR** 28–22 | 8,995 | |
| October 4 | 3:30 p.m. | Eastern Michigan | **Buffalo** | UB Stadium • Amherst, NY | ESPN+ | **UB** 31–30 ^{OT} | 17,300 | |
| October 4 | 3:30 p.m. | Miami (OH) | **Northern Illinois** | Huskie Stadium • DeKalb, IL | ESPN+ | **M-OH** 25–14 | 13,827 | |
| October 4 | 4:00 p.m. | Kent State | No. 5 Oklahoma | Gaylord Family Oklahoma Memorial Stadium • Norman, OK | SECN | **L** 0–44 | 83,016 | |
^{#}Rankings from AP Poll released prior to game. All times are in Eastern Time.

=== Week 7 ===
| Date | Time | Visiting team | Home team | Site | TV | Result | Attendance | Ref. |
|---|---|---|---|---|---|---|---|---|
| October 11 | 12:00 p.m. | **Toledo** | **Bowling Green** | Doyt Perry Stadium • Bowling Green, OH (Battle of I-75) | ESPNU | **BGSU** 28–23 | 24,000 | |
| October 11 | 12:00 p.m. | **Miami (OH)** | **Akron** | InfoCision Stadium • Akron, OH | ESPN+ | **M-OH** 20–7 | 6,575 | |
| October 11 | 1:00 p.m. | **Northern Illinois** | **Eastern Michigan** | Rynearson Stadium • Ypsilanti, MI | ESPN+ | **EMU** 16–10 | 15,676 | |
| October 11 | 2:30 p.m. | **UMass** | **Kent State** | Dix Stadium • Kent, OH | ESPN+ | **KSU** 42–6 | 11,523 | |
| October 11 | 3:30 p.m. | **Ball State** | **Western Michigan** | Waldo Stadium • Kalamazoo, MI | ESPN+ | **WMU** 42–0 | 20,032 | |
^{#}Rankings from AP Poll released prior to game. All times are in Eastern Time.

=== Week 8 ===
| Date | Time | Visiting team | Home team | Site | TV | Result | Attendance | Ref. |
|---|---|---|---|---|---|---|---|---|
| October 18 | 12:00 p.m. | Eastern Michigan | Miami (OH) | Yager Stadium • Oxford, OH | ESPN+ | **M-OH** 44–30 | 6,832 | |
| October 18 | 12:00 p.m. | Central Michigan | Bowling Green | Doyt Perry Stadium • Bowling Green, OH | CBSSN | **CMU** 27–6 | 23,105 | |
| October 18 | 2:00 p.m. | Kent State | Toledo | Glass Bowl • Toledo, OH | ESPN+ | **TOL** 45–10 | 18,417 | |
| October 18 | 2:30 p.m. | Buffalo | UMass | McGuirk Alumni Stadium • Hadley, MA | ESPN+ | **UB** 28–21 | 15,239 | |
| October 18 | 3:30 p.m. | Northern Illinois | Ohio | Peden Stadium • Athens, OH | ESPN+ | **OHIO** 48–21 | 22,293 | |
| October 18 | 3:30 p.m. | Akron | Ball State | Scheumann Stadium • Muncie, IN | ESPN+ | **BSU** 42–28 | 12,248 | |
^{#}Rankings from AP Poll released prior to game. All times are in Eastern Time.

=== Week 9 ===
| Date | Time | Visiting team | Home team | Site | TV | Result | Attendance | Ref. |
|---|---|---|---|---|---|---|---|---|
| October 25 | 12:00 p.m. | Bowling Green | **Kent State** | Dix Stadium • Kent, OH (Anniversary Award) | ESPN+ | **KSU** 24–21 | 9,260 | |
| October 25 | 12:00 p.m. | Ohio | **Eastern Michigan** | Rynearson Stadium • Ypsilanti, MI | CBSSN | **OHIO** 28–21 | 15,985 | |
| October 25 | 1:00 p.m. | Akron | **Buffalo** | UB Stadium • Amherst, NY | ESPN+ | **AKR** 24–16 | 12,491 | |
| October 25 | 3:30 p.m. | Toledo | Washington State | Martin Stadium • Pullman, WA | The CW | **L** 7–28 | 27,646 | |
| October 25 | 3:30 p.m. | Ball State | **Northern Illinois** | Huskie Stadium • DeKalb, IL (Bronze Stalk Trophy) | ESPN+ | **NIU** 21–7 | 10,124 | |
| October 25 | 3:30 p.m. | UMass | **Central Michigan** | Kelly/Shorts Stadium • Mount Pleasant, MI | ESPN+ | **CMU** 38–13 | 20,489 | |
| October 25 | 3:30 p.m. | Western Michigan | **Miami (OH)** | Yager Stadium • Oxford, OH | ESPN+ | **M-OH** 26–17 | 18,025 | |
^{#}Rankings from AP Poll released prior to game. All times are in Eastern Time.

=== Week 10 ===
| Date | Time | Visiting team | Home team | Site | TV | Result | Attendance | Ref. |
|---|---|---|---|---|---|---|---|---|
| November 1 | 12:00 p.m. | **Buffalo** | **Bowling Green** | Doyt Perry Stadium • Bowling Green, OH | ESPN+ | **UB** 28–3 | 11,876 | |
| November 1 | 4:00 p.m. | **Central Michigan** | **Western Michigan** | Waldo Stadium • Kalamazoo, MI (Michigan MAC Trophy, rivalry) | ESPNU | **WMU** 24–21 | 29,299 | |
^{#}Rankings from AP Poll released prior to game. All times are in Eastern Time.

=== Week 11 ===
| Date | Time | Visiting team | Home team | Site | TV | Result | Attendance | Ref. |
|---|---|---|---|---|---|---|---|---|
| November 4 | 7:00 p.m. | **Miami (OH)** | **Ohio** | Peden Stadium • Athens, OH (Battle of the Bricks) | ESPN2 | **OHIO** 24–20 | 22,231 | |
| November 4 | 7:00 p.m. | **UMass** | **Akron** | InfoCision Stadium • Akron, OH | CBSSN | **AKR** 44–10 | 5,046 | |
| November 5 | 7:00 p.m. | **Northern Illinois** | **Toledo** | Glass Bowl • Toledo, OH | ESPN2 | **TOL** 42–3 | 22,128 | |
| November 5 | 7:00 p.m. | **Kent State** | **Ball State** | Scheumann Stadium • Muncie, IN | ESPNU | **BSU** 17–13 | 5,225 | |
| November 8 | 1:00 p.m. | **Bowling Green** | **Eastern Michigan** | Rynearson Stadium • Ypsilanti, MI | ESPN+ | **EMU** 27–21 | 11,889 | |
^{#}Rankings from College Football Playoff. All times are in Eastern Time.

=== Week 12 ===
| Date | Time | Visiting team | Home team | Site | TV | Result | Attendance | Ref. |
|---|---|---|---|---|---|---|---|---|
| November 11 | 7:30 p.m. | Kent State | Akron | InfoCision Stadium • Akron, OH (Wagon Wheel) | ESPNU | **KSU** 42–35 ^{OT} | 8,501 | |
| November 11 | 8:00 p.m. | Ohio | Western Michigan | Waldo Stadium • Kalamazoo, MI | ESPN2 | **WMU** 17–13 | 10,849 | |
| November 12 | 7:00 p.m. | Toledo | Miami (OH) | Yager Stadium • Oxford, OH | ESPN2 | **TOL** 24–3 | 10,825 | |
| November 12 | 7:00 p.m. | Northern Illinois | UMass | McGuirk Alumni Stadium • Hadley, MA | ESPNU | **NIU** 45–3 | 6,155 | |
| November 12 | 7:00 p.m. | Buffalo | Central Michigan | Kelly/Shorts Stadium • Mount Pleasant, MI | CBSSN | **CMU** 38–19 | 6,833 | |
| November 15 | 12:00 p.m. | Eastern Michigan | Ball State | Scheumann Stadium • Muncie, IN | ESPN+ | **EMU** 24–9 | | |
^{#}Rankings from College Football Playoff. All times are in Eastern Time.

=== Week 13 ===
| Date | Time | Visiting team | Home team | Site | TV | Result | Attendance | Ref. |
|---|---|---|---|---|---|---|---|---|
| November 18 | 7:00 pm | Akron | Bowling Green | Doyt Perry Stadium • Bowling Green, OH | ESPNU | **AKR** 19–16 | 9,867 | |
| November 18 | 7:15 pm | UMass | Ohio | Peden Stadium • Athens, OH | CBSSN | **OHIO** 42–14 | 12,438 | |
| November 18 | 7:00 pm | Western Michigan | Northern Illinois | Huskie Stadium • DeKalb, IL | ESPN2 | **WMU** 35–19 | 4,734 | |
| November 19 | 7:00 pm | Miami (OH) | Buffalo | UB Stadium • Amherst, NY | ESPN2 | **M-OH** 37–20 | 15,246 | |
| November 19 | 7:00 pm | Central Michigan | Kent State | Dix Stadium • Kent, OH | ESPNU | **CMU** 28–16 | 8,112 | |
| November 22 | 2:00 pm | Ball State | Toledo | Glass Bowl • Toledo, OH | ESPN+ | **TOL** 38–9 | 15,127 | |
^{#}Rankings from College Football Playoff. All times are in Eastern Time.

=== Week 14 ===
| Date | Time | Visiting team | Home team | Site | TV | Result | Attendance | Ref. |
|---|---|---|---|---|---|---|---|---|
| November 25 | 4:30 p.m. | Bowling Green | UMass | McGuirk Alumni Stadium • Hadley, MA | ESPNU | **BGSU** 45–14 | 6,043 | |
| November 25 | 7:30 p.m. | Western Michigan | Eastern Michigan | Rynearson Stadium • Ypsilanti, MI (Michigan MAC Trophy) | ESPN2 | **WMU** 31–21 | 11,818 | |
| November 28 | 12:00 p.m. | Ohio | Buffalo | UB Stadium • Amherst, NY | ESPNU | **OHIO** 31–26 | | |
| November 28 | 12:00 p.m. | Kent State | Northern Illinois | Huskie Stadium • DeKalb, IL | CBSSN | **KSU** 35–31 | | |
| November 29 | 12:00 p.m. | Toledo | Central Michigan | Kelly/Shorts Stadium • Mount Pleasant, MI | ESPN+ | **TOL** 21–3 | | |
| November 29 | 12:00 p.m. | Ball State | Miami (OH) | Yager Stadium • Oxford, OH | CBSSN | **M-OH** 45–24 | | |
^{#}Rankings from College Football Playoff. All times are in Eastern Time.

=== MAC Conference Championship Game ===
| Date | Time | Visiting team | Home team | Site | TV | Result | Attendance | Ref. |
|---|---|---|---|---|---|---|---|---|
| December 6 | 12:00 | **Miami (OH)** | **Western Michigan** | Ford Field • Detroit, MI | ESPN | **WMU** 23–13 | 19,114 | |
^{#}Rankings from College Football Playoff. All times are in Eastern Time.

== Postseason ==
=== Bowl Games ===
Legend
| MAC win |
| MAC loss |

| Bowl game | Date | Site | TV | Time (EST) | MAC team | Opponent | Result | Attendance |
|---|---|---|---|---|---|---|---|---|
| Myrtle Beach | Dec 19 | Brooks Stadium • Conway, SC | ESPN | 11:00 a.m. | Western Michigan | Kennesaw St | W 41–6 | 9,139 |
| Boca Raton | Dec 23 | Flagler Credit Union Stadium • Boca Raton, FL | ESPN | 2:00 p.m. | Toledo | Louisville | L 22–27 | 15,329 |
| Frisco | Dec 23 | Ford Center at The Star • Frisco, TX | ESPN | 9:00 p.m. | Ohio | UNLV | W 17–10 | 6,521 |
| GameAbove Sports | Dec 26 | Ford Field • Detroit, MI | ESPN | 1:00 p.m. | Central Michigan | Northwestern | L 7–34 | 27,857 |
| Arizona | Dec 27 | Casino Del Sol Stadium • Tucson, AZ | CW | 4:30 p.m. | Miami (OH) | Fresno State | L 3-18 | 37,232 |

== MAC records vs. other conferences ==
2025–2026 records against non-conference foes, including bowl games:

Regular season & bowls

| Power Four Conferences | Record |
|---|---|
| ACC | 0–4 |
| Big 12 | 1–2 |
| Big Ten | 0–13 |
| Notre Dame | 0–0 |
| SEC | 0–6 |
| Power 5 Total | 1–25 |
| Other FBS Conferences | Record |
| American | 0–3 |
| CUSA | 3–0 |
| Independents (Excluding Notre Dame) | 0–2 |
| Mountain West | 2–4 |
| Pac-12 | 0–1 |
| Sun Belt | 1–2 |
| Other FBS Total | 6–12 |
| FCS Opponents | Record |
| Football Championship Subdivision | 11–2 |
| Total Non-Conference Record | 18–39 |

=== Mid-American vs Power 4 matchups ===
This is a list of regular season games the MAC has scheduled versus power conference teams (ACC, Big Ten, Big 12, Notre Dame and SEC). All rankings are from the current AP Poll at the time of the game.

| Date | Conference | Visitor | Home | Site | Score |
|---|---|---|---|---|---|
| August 28 | Big Ten | Buffalo | Minnesota | Huntington Bank Stadium • Minneapolis, MN | L 10–23 |
| August 28 | Big Ten | Miami (OH) | Wisconsin | Camp Randall Stadium • Madison, WI | L 0–17 |
| August 28 | Big Ten | Ohio | Rutgers | SHI Stadium • Piscataway, NJ | L 31–34 |
| August 30 | Big Ten | Western Michigan | Michigan State | Spartan Stadium • East Lansing, MI | L 6–23 |
| August 30 | SEC | Toledo | Kentucky | Kroger Field • Lexington, KY | L 16–24 |
| August 30 | Big Ten | Ball State | Purdue | Ross–Ade Stadium • West Lafayette, IN | L 0–31 |
| September 6 | Big Ten | Akron | Nebraska | Memorial Stadium • Lincoln, NE | L 0–68 |
| September 6 | SEC | Ball State | Auburn | Jordan-Hare Stadium • Auburn, AL | L 3–42 |
| September 6 | Big 12 | West Virginia | Ohio | Peden Stadium • Athens, OH | W 17–10 |
| September 6 | Big Ten | Northern Illinois | Maryland | SECU Stadium • College Park, MD | L 9–20 |
| September 6 | ACC | Central Michigan | Pittsburgh | Acrisure Stadium • Pittsburgh, PA | L 17–45 |
| September 6 | Big 12 | Kent State | Texas Tech | Jones AT&T Stadium • Lubbock, TX | L 14–62 |
| September 6 | Big Ten | Miami (OH) | Rutgers | SHI Stadium • Piscataway, NJ | L 17–45 |
| September 6 | Big 12 | Bowling Green | Cincinnati | Nippert Stadium • Cincinnati, OH | L 20–34 |
| September 13 | SEC | Eastern Michigan | Kentucky | Kroger Field • Lexington, KY | L 23–48 |
| September 13 | Big Ten | Central Michigan | Michigan | Michigan Stadium • Ann Arbor, MI | L 3–63 |
| September 13 | Big Ten | Ohio | Ohio State | Ohio Stadium • Columbus, OH | L 9–37 |
| September 13 | Big Ten | Western Michigan | Illinois | Memorial Stadium • Champaign, IL | L 0–28 |
| September 13 | Big Ten | UMass | Iowa | Kinnick Stadium • Iowa City, IA | L 7–47 |
| September 20 | SEC | Northern Illinois | Mississippi State | Davis Wade Stadium • Starkville, MS | L 10–38 |
| September 20 | ACC | Kent State | Florida State | Doak Campbell Stadium • Tallahassee, FL | L 10–66 |
| September 20 | ACC | Bowling Green | Louisville | L&N Federal Credit Union Stadium • Louisville, KY | L 17–40 |
| September 27 | SEC | UMass | Missouri | Faurot Field • Columbia, MO | L 6–42 |
| October 4 | SEC | Kent State | Oklahoma | Gaylord Family Oklahoma Memorial Stadium • Norman, OK | L 0–44 |

=== Mid-American vs other FBS matchups ===
The following regular season games include MAC teams competing against teams from the American, CUSA, Mountain West, Pac-12 or Sun Belt.

| Date | Conference | Visitor | Home | Site | Score |
|---|---|---|---|---|---|
| August 28 | Mountain West | Wyoming | Akron | InfoCision Stadium • Akron, OH | L 0–10 |
| August 28 | Mountain West | Central Michigan | San Jose State | CEFCU Stadium • San Jose, CA | W 16–14 |
| August 30 | American | Temple | UMass | McGuirk Alumni Stadium • Hadley, MA | L 10–42 |
| August 30 | Sun Belt | Eastern Michigan | Texas State | UFCU Stadium • San Marcos, TX | L 27–52 |
| September 6 | C-USA | Western Kentucky | Toledo | Glass Bowl • Toledo, OH | W 45–21 |
| September 6 | American | North Texas | Western Michigan | Waldo Stadium • Kalamazoo, MI | L 30–33 |
| September 13 | American | Akron | UAB | Protective Stadium • Birmingham, AL | L 28–31 |
| September 13 | C-USA | Liberty | Bowling Green | Doyt Perry Stadium • Bowling Green, OH | W 23–13 |
| September 20 | Sun Belt | Troy | Buffalo | UB Stadium • Buffalo, NY | L 21–17 |
| September 20 | Mountain West | UNLV | Miami (OH) | Yager Stadium • Oxford, OH | L 38–41 |
| September 20 | Sun Belt | Louisiana | Eastern Michigan | Rynearson Stadium • Ypsilanti, MI | W 34–31 |
| September 27 | Mountain West | San Diego State | Northern Illinois | Huskie Stadium • DeKalb, IL | L 3–6 |
| October 25 | Pac-12 | Toledo | Washington State | Martin Stadium • Pullman, WA | L 7–28 |

=== Mid-American vs FBS independents matchups ===
The following regular season games include MAC teams competing against FBS Independents, which only includes UConn for 2025.

| Date | Visitor | Home | Site | Score |
|---|---|---|---|---|
| September 20 | Ball State | UConn | Rentschler Field • East Hartford, CT | L 25–31 |
| September 27 | UConn | Buffalo | UB Stadium • Buffalo, NY | L 17–20 |

=== Mid-American vs. FCS matchups ===
The following regular season games include MAC teams competing against FCS schools.

| Date | Visitor | Home | Site | Score |
|---|---|---|---|---|
| August 28 | Lafayette | Bowling Green | Doyt Perry Stadium • Bowling Green, OH | W 26–7 |
| August 30 | Merrimack | Kent State | Dix Stadium • Kent, OH | W 21–17 |
| August 30 | Holy Cross | Northern Illinois | Huskie Stadium • DeKalb, IL | W19–17 |
| September 6 | Saint Francis (PA) | Buffalo | UB Stadium • Buffalo, NY | W 45–6 |
| September 6 | LIU | Eastern Michigan | Rynearson Stadium • Ypsilanti, MI | L 23–28 |
| September 6 | Bryant | UMass | McGuirk Alumni Stadium • Hadley, MA | L 26–27 |
| September 13 | Morgan State | Toledo | Glass Bowl • Toledo, OH | W 60–0 |
| September 13 | New Hampshire | Ball State | Scheumann Stadium • Muncie, IN | W 34–29 |
| September 20 | Duquesne | Akron | InfoCision Stadium • Akron, OH | W 51–7 |
| September 20 | Gardner–Webb | Ohio | Peden Stadium • Athens, OH | W 52–35 |
| September 20 | Wagner | Central Michigan | Kelly/Shorts Stadium • Mount Pleasant, MI | W 49–10 |
| September 27 | Lindenwood | Miami (OH) | Yager Stadium • Oxford, OH | W 38–0 |
| September 27 | Rhode Island | Western Michigan | Waldo Stadium • Kalamazoo, MI | W 47–14 |

== Head to head matchups ==
2025 MAC Head to head
| Team | Akron | Ball State | Bowling Green | Buffalo | Central Michigan | Eastern Michigan | Kent State | Miami (OH) | Northern Illinois | Ohio | Toledo | UMass | Western Michigan |
|---|---|---|---|---|---|---|---|---|---|---|---|---|---|
| Akron | — | 28–42 | 19–16 | 24–16 | 28–22 | — | 35–42 | 7–20 | — | — | 3–45 | 44–10 | — |
| Ball State | 42–28 | — | — | — | — | 9–24 | 17–13 | 45–24 | 7–21 | 20–14 | 9–38 | — | 0–42 |
| Bowling Green | 16–19 | — | — | 3–28 | 6–27 | 21–27 | 21–24 | — | — | 20–35 | 28–23 | 45–14 | — |
| Buffalo | 16–24 | — | 28–3 | — | 19–38 | 31–30 | 31–28 | 20–37 | — | 26–31 | — | 28–21 | — |
| Central Michigan | 22–28 | — | 27–6 | 38–19 | — | 24–13 | 28–16 | — | — | — | 3–21 | 38–13 | 21–24 |
| Eastern Michigan | — | 24–9 | 27–21 | 30–31 | 13–24 | — | — | 30–44 | 16–10 | 21–28 | — | — | 21–31 |
| Kent State | 42–35 | 13–17 | 24–21 | 28–31 | 16–28 | — | — | — | 35–31 | — | 10–45 | 42–6 | — |
| Miami (OH) | 20–7 | 45–24 | — | 37–20 | — | 44–30 | — | — | 25–14 | 20–24 | 3–24 | — | 26–17 |
| Northern Illinois | — | 21–7 | — | — | — | 10–16 | 31–35 | 14–25 | — | 21–48 | 3–42 | 45–3 | 19–35 |
| Ohio | — | 14–20 | 35–20 | 31–26 | — | 28–21 | — | 24–20 | 48–21 | — | — | 42–14 | 13–17 |
| Toledo | 45–3 | 38–9 | 23–28 | — | 21–3 | — | 45–10 | 24–3 | 42–3 | — | — | — | 13–14 |
| UMass | 10–44 | — | 14–45 | 21–28 | 13–38 | — | 6–42 | — | 45–3 | 14–42 | — | — | 3–21 |
| Western Michigan | — | 42–0 | — | — | 24–21 | 31–21 | — | 17–26 | 35–19 | 17–13 | 14–13 | 21–3 | — |

Updated through November 29, 2025, Source:

== Awards and honors ==
=== Player of the week honors ===
| Week | Offensive | | | Defensive | | | Special Teams | | |
| Week | Player | Team | Position | Player | Team | Position | Player | Team | Position |
|---|---|---|---|---|---|---|---|---|---|
| Week 1 | Parker Navarro | Ohio | QB | Red Murdock | Buffalo | LB | Jackson Kleather | Bowling Green | K |
| Week 2 | Chip Trayanum | Toledo | RB | Michael Molnar | Ohio | LB | Palmer Domschke | Western Michigan | K |
| Week 3 | Ta'Quan Roberson | Buffalo | QB | Mitchell Gonser | Buffalo | LB | Jackson Kleather (2) | Bowling Green | K |
| Week 4 | Jordan Gant | Akron | RB | Bryce Llewellyn | Eastern Michigan | DB | Rudy Kessinger | Eastern Michigan | K |
| Week 5 | Tucker Gleason | Toledo | QB | Cameron Hollobaugh | Ohio | LB | Palmer Domschke (2) | Western Michigan | K |
| Week 6 | Victor Snow | Buffalo | WR | Nathan Voorhis | Ball State | DE | Dylan Drennan | Buffalo | P |
| Week 7 | Broc Lowry | Western Michigan | QB | Gideon Lampron; Nadame Tucker | Bowling Green; Western Michigan | LB; DE | Rudy Kessinger (2) | Eastern Michigan | K |
| Week 8 | Sieh Bangura; Tucker Gleason (2) | Ohio; Toledo | RB; QB | Jordan Kwiatkowski | Central Michigan | LB | Pierse Stainton | Miami | P |
| Week 9 | Parker Navarro (2) | Ohio | QB | Melvin Spriggs | Akron | LB | Dom Dzioban | Miami | K |
| Week 10 | Broc Lowry (2) | Western Michigan | QB | Red Murdock (2) | Buffalo | LB | Palmer Domschke (3) | Western Michigan | K |
| Week 11 | Tucker Gleason (3) | Toledo | QB | Gage Summers | Akron | LB | Sieh Bangura; Trayvon Rudolph | Ohio; Toledo | KR/RB; KR/WR |
| Week 12 | Dru DeShields | Kent State | QB | Michael Heldman; Mason Woods | Central Michigan; Kent State | DL; LB | Charlie Durkin | Kent State | P |
| Week 13 | Sieh Bangura (2); Chip Trayanum (2) | Ohio; Toledo | RB; RB | Jordan Kwiatkowski (2) | Central Michigan | LB | Matthew Schramm; Dom Dzioban (2) | Akron; Miami | K K |
| Week 14 | Dontae McMillan | Eastern Michigan | RB | Quinn Urwiler | Northern Illinois | LB | Ryan Millmore | Western Michigan | P |

=== MAC Individual Awards ===
The following individuals received postseason honors as voted by the Mid-American Conference football coaches at the end of the season.

| Award | Player | School |
|---|---|---|
| Offensive Player of the Year | Broc Lowry | Western Michigan |
| Defensive Player of the Year | Nadame Tucker | Western Michigan |
| Special Teams Player of the Year | Da'Realyst Clark | Kent State |
| Freshman Player of the Year | Cameron Pettaway | Bowling Green |
| Vern Smith Leadership Award | Nadame Tucker | Western Michigan |
| Coach of the Year | Lance Taylor | Western Michigan |

=== All-Conference Teams ===
The following players were listed as part of the All-Conference teams.

| Position | Player | Team |
|---|---|---|
First Team Offense
| QB | Broc Lowry | Western Michigan |
| OL | Trevor Brock | Buffalo |
| OL | Davion Weatherspoon | Ohio |
| OL | Anthony Boswell | Toledo |
| OL | Raheem Anderson | Western Michigan |
| OL | Chad Schuster | Western Michigan |
| TE | Jyrin Johnson | Bowling Green |
| WR | Nik McMillan | Buffalo |
| WR | Victor Snow | Buffalo |
| WR | Kam Perry | Miami |
| WR | Junior Vandeross III | Toledo |
| RB | Sieh Bangura | Ohio |
| RB | Chip Trayanum | Toledo |
| PK | Dom Dzioban | Miami |
First Team Defense
| DL | Nathan Voorhis | Ball State |
| DL | Michael Heldman | Central Michigan |
| DL | Adam Trick | Miami |
| DL | Nadame Tucker | Western Michigan |
| LB | Gideon Lampron | Bowling Green |
| LB | Red Murdock | Buffalo |
| LB | Jordan Kwiatkowski | Central Michigan |
| LB | K’Von Sherman | Toledo |
| DB | Eli Blakey | Miami |
| DB | Emmanuel McNeil-Warren | Toledo |
| DB | Andre Fuller | Toledo |
| DB | Braden Awls | Toledo |
| P | Keegan Andrews | UMass |
First Team Specialists
| KR | Cameron Pettaway | Bowling Green |
| KR | Da’Realyst Clark | Kent State |

| Position | Player | Team |
|---|---|---|
Second Team Offense
| QB | Parker Navarro | Ohio |
| OL | Nate Pabst | Bowling Green |
| OL | Tyler Doty | Buffalo |
| OL | Drew Terrill | Miami |
| OL | Jordon Jones | Ohio |
| OL | Ethan Spoth | Toledo |
| TE | Joshua Long | Eastern Michigan |
| WR | Israel Polk | Akron |
| WR | Marcel Williams | Akron |
| WR | Chase Hendricks | Ohio |
| WR | Trayvon Rudolph | Toledo |
| RB | Jordan Gant | Akron |
| RB | Dontae McMillan | Eastern Michigan |
| PK | Jackson Kleather | Bowling Green |
Second Team Defense
| DL | Julien Laventure | Akron |
| DL | Jamond Mathis | Kent State |
| DL | Marques White | UMass |
| DL | Jay Crable | Ohio |
| DL | Martez Poynter | Toledo |
| LB | Dakota Cochran | Central Michigan |
| LB | CJ Young | Kent State |
| LB | Corban Hondru | Miami |
| LB | Quinton Urwiler | Northern Illinois |
| DB | Bryce Llewellyn | Eastern Michigan |
| DB | Silas Walters | Miami |
| DB | Avery Smith | Toledo |
| DB | Tate Hallock | Western Michigan |
| P | Dylan Drennan | Buffalo |
Second Team Specialists
| KR | Victor Snow | Buffalo |
| KR | Trayvon Rudolph | Toledo |

| Position | Player | Team |
|---|---|---|
Third Team Offense
| QB | Tucker Gleason | Toledo |
| OL | Keylen Davis | Akron |
| OL | Mickey Rewolinski | Eastern Michigan |
| OL | Eric Smith | Miami |
| OL | Evan Malcore | Northern Illinois |
| OL | Nick Marinaro | Ohio |
| TE | Mason Williams | Ohio |
| WR | Langston Lewis | Central Michigan |
| WR | Nick Devereaux | Eastern Michigan |
| WR | Cade Wolford | Kent State |
| WR | Jacquon Gibson | UMass |
| RB | Chavon Wright | Northern Illinois |
| RB | Jalen Buckley | Western Michigan |
| PK | Jack Howes | Buffalo |
| PK | Cade Graham | Central Michigan |
Third Team Defense
| DL | Bruno Dall | Akron |
| DL | Junior Poyser | Buffalo |
| DL | Malachi Davis | Toledo |
| DL | Esean Carter | Toledo |
| LB | Mason Woods | Kent State |
| LB | Tyler Martin | UMass |
| LB | Jackson Kuwatch | Miami |
| LB | Chris D’Appolonia | Toledo |
| DB | MJ Cannon | Bowling Green |
| DB | Jalen McClendon | Bowling Green |
| DB | Tank Pearson | Ohio |
| DB | Josh Franklin | Western Michigan |
| P | Mitchell Tomasek | Eastern Michigan |
Third Team Specialists
| KR | Dev’ion Reynolds | Northern Illinois |
| KR | Bryson Hammer | Toledo |

=== All-Americans ===
| Position | Player | School | Selector |
|---|---|---|---|
First Team All-Americans
| DB | Emmanuel McNeil-Warren | Toledo | (PFF) |
| LS | Jovoni Borbon | UMass | (PFF) |

| Position | Player | School | Selector |
|---|---|---|---|
Second Team All-Americans
| DL | Nadame Tucker | Western Michigan | (WCFF, ESPN) |
| LB | Red Murdock | Buffalo | (AP, FWAA, WCFF, CBS) |
| DB | Emmanuel McNeil-Warren | Toledo | (FWAA, TSN, CBS) |
| P | Keegan Andrews | UMass | (FWAA) |

== NFL draft ==
The 2026 NFL draft will be held in Pittsburgh, Pennsylvania. The following list includes all MAC players in the draft.

=== List of selections ===
| Player | Position | School | Draft Round | Round Pick | Overall Pick | Team |
|---|---|---|---|---|---|---|
| Emmanuel McNeil-Warren | S | Toledo | 2 | 26 | 58 | Cleveland Browns |
| Jackson Kuwatch | LB | Miami | 7 | 11 | 227 | Carolina Panthers |
| Andre Fuller | CB | Toledo | 7 | 20 | 236 | Seattle Seahawks |
| Red Murdock | LB | Buffalo | 7 | 41 | 257 | Denver Broncos |
