= Lakota East High School =

Public high school in Liberty Township, Ohio, United States

Location
- 6840 Lakota Lane; Liberty Township, (Butler County), Ohio 45044; United States; 39°22′45″N 84°22′17″W

Information
- Type: Public high school
- Established: 1997
- Status: Open
- School district: Lakota Local School District
- Superintendent: Ashley Whitely
- Principal: Matt MacFarlane
- Teaching staff: 99.96 (FTE)
- Grades: 9-12
- Enrollment: 2,605 (2023–2024)
- Student to teacher ratio: 26.06
- Colors: Black and silver
- Athletics conference: Greater Miami Conference
- Team name: Thunderhawks
- Accreditation: North Central Association of Colleges and Schools
- Newspaper: Spark
- Website: easthigh.lakotaonline.com

Lakota East High School is a four-year, public high school in Liberty Township, a suburb of Cincinnati, Ohio, United States. It is a member of the Lakota Local School District, which comprises both West Chester Township and Liberty Township. The district was originally unified under one high school, Lakota High School, until 1997 when the district expanded and formed two new high schools – Lakota East and Lakota West. The high school enrolls over 2,500 students in grades 9–12, repurposing the former high school as a freshman building named Lakota West Freshman School.

== History ==
Along with Lakota West High School, Lakota East was part of a unified Lakota High School. The two physically identical schools were built in 1997 when severe overcrowding forced the district to expand. In 2009, the old Lakota Freshman School was split, and a brand new building was made for Lakota East freshmen. The old Lakota Freshman School is now current the Lakota West Freshman School.

Several additions and renovations were made to Lakota East High School by Turner Construction during the 2007-2008 school year.

== Athletics ==
Lakota East's mascot is the Thunderhawk. The school colors are black, white, and silver. The school is classified as a Division I school in all sports under OHSAA standards and is a member of the Greater Miami Conference.

=== Ohio High School Athletic Association State Championships ===
- Baseball - 2011
- Girls Track - 2019

== Notable alumni ==
- Scott McGregor (2005), pitcher who played professionally in South Korea and Taiwan
- David Zennie (2005), film director
- Emily Henry (2009), New York Times bestselling author
- Hayden Senger (2015), catcher for the New York Mets
- Nate Johnson (2021), basketball player
- Austin Siereveld (2023), college football offensive guard for the Ohio State Buckeyes

Lakota East is believed to have awarded the first honorary high school diplomas in Ohio, to a group of 20 World War II veterans in May 2001. They also have held naturalization ceremonies for the public and students in 2023, 2024, 2025, and 2026.
