= Andre Fuller =

American football player (born 2002)

No. 35 – Seattle Seahawks
- Position: Cornerback
- Roster status: Practice squad

Personal information
- Born: April 8, 2002 (age 24)
- Listed height: 6 ft 1 in (1.85 m)
- Listed weight: 200 lb (91 kg)

Career information
- High school: Seminole Ridge (Loxahatchee, Florida)
- College: Arkansas–Pine Bluff (2020–2021); Toledo (2022–2025)
- NFL draft: 2026: 7th round, 236th overall pick

Career history
- Seattle Seahawks (2026–present)*
- * Offseason or practice squad member only

Awards and highlights
- First-team All-MAC (2025)
- Stats at Pro Football Reference

Andre Fuller (born April 8, 2002) is an American professional football cornerback for the Seattle Seahawks of the National Football League (NFL). He played college football for the Arkansas–Pine Bluff Golden Lions and Toledo Rockets and was selected by the Seahawks in the seventh round of the 2026 NFL draft.

== Early life ==
Fuller was born on April 8, 2002, and is from Palm Beach, Florida. He is the oldest of six children and was raised by his mother. He attended Seminole Ridge Community High School where he played football as a cornerback and wide receiver. As a senior in 2019, he was selected to the all-county and all-district teams. Fuller was a zero-star recruit and walked-on to play college football for the Arkansas–Pine Bluff Golden Lions in 2020.

== College career ==
Fuller appeared in six games, three as a starter, for the Golden Lions during the COVID-19-shortened 2020 season, posting nine tackles and three pass breakups. He then had a team-leading 17 passes defended along with 29 tackles, three tackles-for-loss (TFLs) and three interceptions (including a 95-yard interception return touchdown) in nine starts during the 2021 season. Following two years at Arkansas–Pine Bluff, Fuller transferred in 2022 to the Toledo Rockets. At the start of his Toledo career, he played safety. Fuller totaled 18 tackles and three passes defended in 14 games, two starts, in 2022, then had 11 tackles in 14 games as a backup in 2023.. He suffered a sports hernia that required surgery prior to the 2024 season, causing him to miss the entire year. He started all 13 games as a cornerback in 2025, his final year, totaling 49 tackles, 10 pass breakups and an interception while being named first-team All-Mid-American Conference (MAC) and a Group of Five All-American. At the conclusion of his collegiate career, Fuller was invited to the 2026 East–West Shrine Bowl and to the NFL Scouting Combine.

== Professional career ==
Pre-draft measurables
Height	Weight	Arm length	Hand span	Wingspan	40-yard dash	10-yard split	20-yard split	20-yard shuttle	Vertical jump	Broad jump
6 ft 1 in (1.85 m)	200 lb (91 kg)	30 3/4 in (0.78 m)	9 3/8 in (0.24 m)	6 ft 4 3/4 in (1.95 m)	4.49 s	1.56 s	2.62 s	4.28 s	35.0 in (0.89 m)	10 ft 9 in (3.28 m)
All values from NFL Combine

Fuller was selected by the Seattle Seahawks in the seventh round with the 236th overall pick of the 2026 NFL draft. He was waived by the Seahawks on August 30, 2026, as a part of final roster cuts, and re-signed a day later to the practice squad.
