= Jackson Kuwatch =

American football player (born 2003)

No. 46 – Carolina Panthers
- Position: Linebacker
- Roster status: Active

Personal information
- Born: May 19, 2003 (age 23); Cincinnati, Ohio, U.S.
- Listed height: 6 ft 4 in (1.93 m)
- Listed weight: 234 lb (106 kg)

Career information
- High school: Lakota West (West Chester, Ohio)
- College: Ohio State (2021–2022); Miami (OH) (2023–2025)
- NFL draft: 2026: 7th round, 227th overall pick

Career history
- Carolina Panthers (2026–present)

Awards and highlights
- Third-team All-MAC (2025)

Career NFL statistics as of Week 4, 2026
- Tackles: 3
- Stats at Pro Football Reference

Jackson Kuwatch (born May 19, 2003) is an American professional football linebacker for the Carolina Panthers of the National Football League (NFL). He played college football for the Ohio State Buckeyes and Miami RedHawks and was selected by the Panthers in the seventh round of the 2026 NFL draft.

== Early life ==
Kuwatch attended Lakota West High School located in West Chester, Ohio. Coming out of high school, he committed to play college football for the Ohio State Buckeyes, joining the team as a preferred walk-on.

== College career ==
=== Ohio State ===
After not receiving any game action in 2021 and 2022, Kuwatch decided to enter his name into the NCAA transfer portal.

=== Miami Ohio ===
Kuwatch transferred to play for the Miami RedHawks. During his first season as a RedHawk in 2023, he played in ten games, recording five tackles with one being for a loss. In the 2024 season, Kuwatch posted nine tackles. In the 2025 regular season finale, he led the team with eight tackles in a victory over Ball State. Kuwatch finished his breakout 2025 season, totaling 109 tackles with ten going for a loss, five sacks, and a pass deflection in 14 games. After the conclusion of the season, he declared for the 2026 NFL draft, while also accepting an invite to participate in the 2026 East-West Shrine Bowl.

== Professional career ==
Pre-draft measurables
Height	Weight	Arm length	Hand span	Wingspan	40-yard dash	10-yard split	20-yard split	20-yard shuttle	Three-cone drill	Vertical jump	Broad jump	Bench press
6 ft 4 in (1.93 m)	232 lb (105 kg)	30 1/2 in (0.77 m)	9 1/8 in (0.23 m)	6 ft 3 3/4 in (1.92 m)	4.67 s	1.50 s	2.68 s	4.40 s	6.95 s	36.5 in (0.93 m)	10 ft 0 in (3.05 m)	15 reps
All values from Pro Day

Kuwatch was selected by the Carolina Panthers in the seventh round with the 227th overall pick of the 2026 NFL draft.
