= Troy Evans (American football) =

American football player (born 1977)

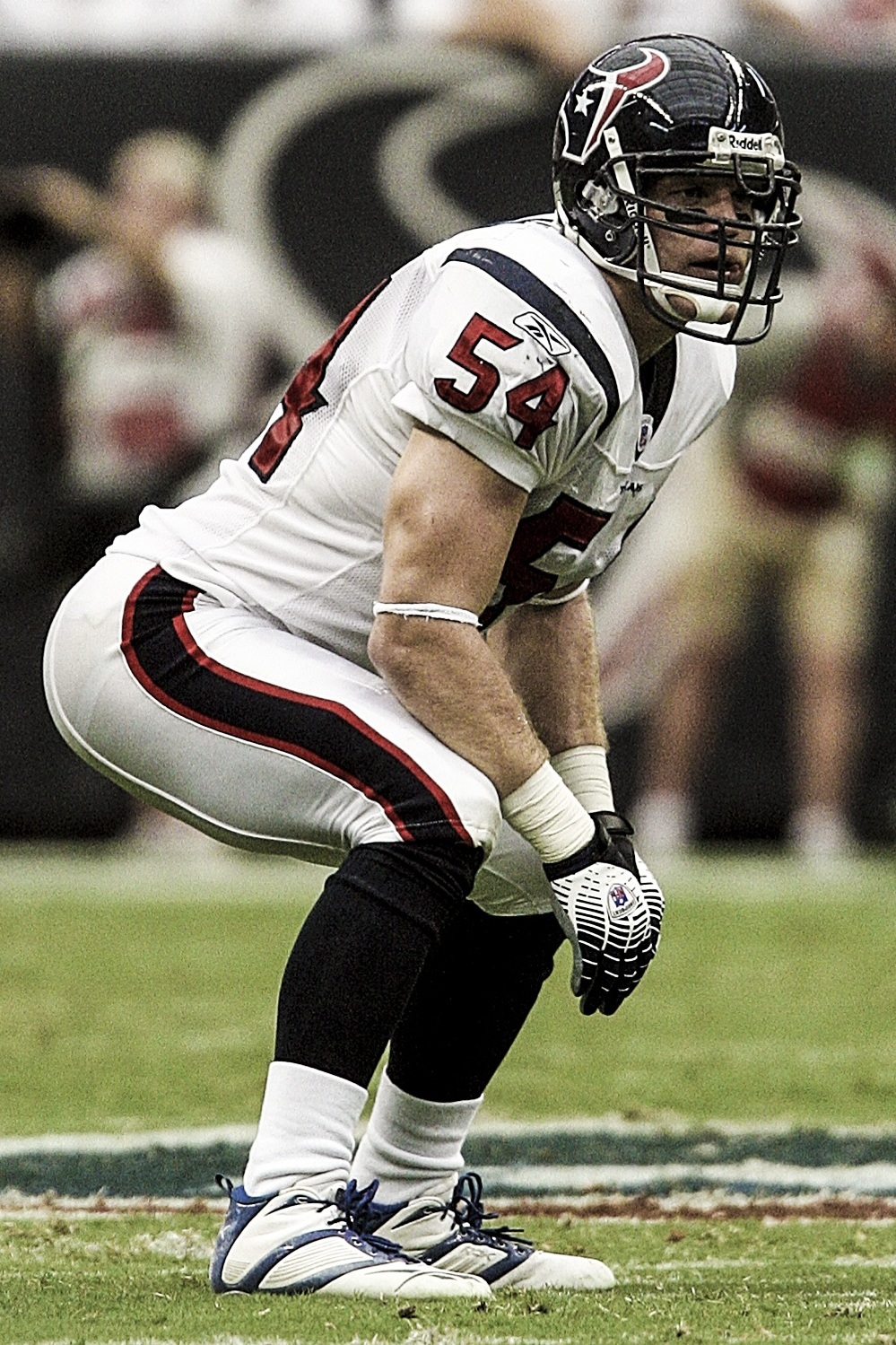
- Evans with the Houston Texans in 2006

No. 54
- Position: Linebacker

Personal information
- Born: December 3, 1977 (age 48); Bay City, Michigan, U.S.
- Listed height: 6 ft 3 in (1.91 m)
- Listed weight: 243 lb (110 kg)

Career information
- High school: West Chester (OH) Lakota
- College: Cincinnati
- NFL draft: 2001: undrafted

Career history
- St. Louis Rams (2001)*; Houston Texans (2002–2006); New Orleans Saints (2007–2009)
- * Offseason or practice squad member only

Awards and highlights
- Super Bowl champion (XLIV)

Career NFL statistics
- Total tackles: 137
- Fumble recoveries: 3
- Pass deflections: 4
- Interceptions: 1
- Stats at Pro Football Reference

Troy Evans (born December 3, 1977) is an American former professional football player who was a linebacker in the National Football League (NFL). He played college football for the Cincinnati Bearcats. Evans played for the St. Louis Rams, Houston Texans, and New Orleans Saints, winning a Super Bowl ring with the Saints in 2009.

== Early life ==
Born in Bay City, Michigan, Evans moved to Cincinnati, Ohio when he was 11, and attended Lakota High School in West Chester Township, north of Cincinnati, where he won All-State honors in both football and basketball.

== College career ==
Evans was a four-year letterman and two-year starter at outside linebacker for the University of Cincinnati. As a senior, he was a second-team All-Conference USA selection and posted 4.5 sacks and 107 tackles. As a junior, he made 96 tackles. He graduated from Cincinnati in 2000 with a business finance degree.

== Professional career ==
Signed as an undrafted free agent, Evans played on the practice squad of the 2001-2002 St. Louis Rams, who lost Super Bowl XXXVI to the New England Patriots.

The following year, Evans was signed as free agent by the Texans. He remained with the team until the 2007 season, when he signed a two-year deal with the New Orleans Saints. He has been used as a special teams player during his career. Evans was selected as Saints special teams captain in 2008 and 2009. As one of the Saints' team captains, Evans was the player who called the pregame coin toss before the Saints' victory in Super Bowl XLIV.

The Saints released Evans on August 24, 2010.

In June 2011, Evans told his home town school board that he was starting a private school bus service for students who were losing their school service due to budget cuts.

== NFL career statistics ==
Legend
**Bold**	Career high

=== Regular season ===
Year	Team	Games		Tackles					Interceptions					Fumbles			
Year	Team	GP	GS	Cmb	Solo	Ast	Sck	TFL	Int	Yds	TD	Lng	PD	FF	FR	Yds	TD
2002	HOU	12	0	14	9	**5**	0.0	0	0	0	0	0	0	0	**1**	0	0
2003	HOU	15	0	13	9	4	0.0	**1**	0	0	0	0	0	0	0	0	0
2004	HOU	13	0	9	8	1	0.0	0	0	0	0	0	0	0	0	0	0
2005	HOU	**16**	0	27	22	**5**	0.0	0	**1**	**3**	0	**3**	**3**	0	**1**	0	0
2006	HOU	**16**	0	14	11	3	0.0	0	0	0	0	0	0	0	0	0	0
2007	NOR	**16**	0	17	15	2	0.0	0	0	0	0	0	0	0	0	0	0
2008	NOR	15	0	14	13	1	0.0	**1**	0	0	0	0	0	0	**1**	**3**	0
2009	NOR	**16**	**2**	**29**	**25**	4	0.0	**1**	0	0	0	0	1	0	0	0	0
		119	2	137	112	25	0.0	3	1	3	0	3	4	0	3	3	0

=== Playoffs ===
Year	Team	Games		Tackles					Interceptions					Fumbles			
Year	Team	GP	GS	Cmb	Solo	Ast	Sck	TFL	Int	Yds	TD	Lng	PD	FF	FR	Yds	TD
2009	NOR	**3**	0	**2**	**2**	0	0.0	0	0	0	0	0	0	0	0	0	0
		3	0	2	2	0	0.0	0	0	0	0	0	0	0	0	0	0
