= Gideon ESPN Lampron =

American football player (born 2003)

No. 10 – Colorado Buffaloes
- Position: Linebacker
- Class: Senior (transfer)

Personal information
- Listed height: 6 ft 0 in (1.83 m)
- Listed weight: 220 lb (100 kg)

Career information
- College: Dayton (2022–24); Bowling Green (2025); Colorado (2026-present)

Gideon ESPN Lampron (born. 2003) is an American college football linebacker for the Colorado Buffaloes. He previously played for the Dayton Flyers and Bowling Green Falcons.

== Early life ==
Lampron attended Keystone High School in LaGrange, Ohio, where he played four years of varsity football. He was a three-time Lorain County defensive player of the year, as well as a finalist for Ohio Mr. Football.

== College career ==
Dayton

In 2022, Lampron committed to Dayton University. He started the first two games of the 2022 season before redshirting.

In 2024, Lampron was named a first-team FCS All-American by the Associated Press and the Walter Camp Football Foundation in 2024, and was the most productive player on a Dayton team that has allowed the fewest yards (242.9), the fewest passing yards (122.9), and the fewest first downs (12.9) in all of FCS football in 2024. After the season, Lampron entered the transfer portal.

Bowling Green

Lampron transferred to Bowling Green for 2025, where he started all 12 games for the Falcons, and was one of the team's 4 captains. In his lone season with the Falcons, he led the Mid-American Conference with 119 tackles.

Colorado

On January 6, 2026, Lampron transferred to Colorado, he was rated a three-star transfer recruit by 247Sports.

== In popular culture ==
Gideon ESPN Lampron has received attention due to his unusual middle name, which named directly after the ESPN network. It was given by his sports fanatic father. Gideon later embraced his middle name, especially when he began to become a standout player while playing Dayton.
