= 2025 Central Michigan Chippewas football team =

American college football season

2025 Central Michigan Chippewas football

GameAbove Sports Bowl, L 7–34 vs. Northwestern
- Conference: Mid-American Conference
- Record: 7–6 (5–3 MAC)
- Head coach: Matt Drinkall (1st season)
- Offensive coordinator: Jim Chapin (1st season)
- Co-offensive coordinator: Derek Fulton (1st season)
- Offensive scheme: Pro spread
- Defensive coordinator: Sean Cronin (1st season)
- Base defense: 3–4
- Home stadium: Kelly/Shorts Stadium

2025 Mid-American Conference football standings
	Conf.			Overall
Team	W		L	W		L
Western Michigan y$	7	–	1	10	–	4
Miami (OH) y	6	–	2	7	–	7
Ohio	6	–	2	9	–	4
Toledo	6	–	2	8	–	5
Central Michigan	5	–	3	7	–	6
Akron*	4	–	4	5	–	7
Buffalo	4	–	4	5	–	7
Kent State	4	–	4	5	–	7
Eastern Michigan	3	–	5	4	–	8
Ball State	3	–	5	4	–	8
Bowling Green	2	–	6	4	–	8
Northern Illinois	2	–	6	3	–	9
UMass	0	–	8	0	–	12
Championship: Western Michigan 23, Miami (OH) 13
$ – Conference champion; y – Championship game participant; * Ineligible for postseason play due to low APR score

The 2025 Central Michigan Chippewas football team represented Central Michigan University in the Mid-American Conference (MAC) during the 2025 NCAA Division I FBS football season. The Chippewas were led by Matt Drinkall in his first year as the head coach. The Chippewas played their home games at Kelly/Shorts Stadium, located in Mount Pleasant, Michigan.

== Preseason ==
The MAC Football Kickoff was held on Thursday, July 24, 2025, at the Ford Field in Detroit, Michigan from 9:00 am EDT to 1:30 pm EDT.

=== Preseason polls ===
==== Coaches Poll ====
On July 24 the MAC announced the preseason coaches' poll.

MAC Coaches poll
Predicted finish	Team	Votes (1st place)
1	Toledo	135 (7)
2	Miami	131 (3)
3	Ohio	123 (3)
4	Buffalo	115
5	Northern Illinois	94
6	Bowling Green	81
7	Western Michigan	71
8	Eastern Michigan	68
9	Central Michigan	65
10	Ball State	41
T11	Akron	39
T11	Massachusetts	39
13	Kent State	12

Coaches poll (MAC Championship)
Predicted finish	Team	Votes
1	Toledo	6
2	Miami	4
3	Ohio	3

== Schedule ==
Date	Time	Opponent	Site	TV	Result	Attendance
August 29	10:30 p.m.	at San Jose State*	CEFCU Stadium; San Jose, CA	FS1	W 16–14	14,877
September 6	12:00 p.m.	at Pittsburgh*	Acrisure Stadium; Pittsburgh, PA	ESPNU	L 17–45	48,424
September 13	12:00 p.m.	at No. 23 Michigan*	Michigan Stadium; Ann Arbor, MI	BTN	L 3–63	110,740
September 20	1:00 p.m.	Wagner*	Kelly/Shorts Stadium; Mount Pleasant, MI	ESPN+	W 49–10	18,787
September 27	1:00 p.m.	Eastern Michigan	Kelly/Shorts Stadium; Mount Pleasant, MI (rivalry)	ESPN+	W 24–13	28,605
October 4	3:30 p.m.	at Akron	InfoCision Stadium–Summa Field; Akron, OH	ESPN+	L 22–28	8,995
October 18	12:00 p.m.	at Bowling Green	Doyt Perry Stadium; Bowling Green, OH	CBSSN	W 27–6	23,105
October 25	3:30 p.m.	UMass	Kelly/Shorts Stadium; Mount Pleasant, MI	ESPN+	W 38–13	20,489
November 1	4:00 p.m.	at Western Michigan	Waldo Stadium; Kalamazoo, MI (rivalry)	ESPNU	L 21–24	29,299
November 12	7:00 p.m.	Buffalo	Kelly/Shorts Stadium; Mount Pleasant, MI	CBSSN	W 38–19	6,833
November 19	7:00 p.m.	at Kent State	Dix Stadium; Kent, OH	ESPNU	W 28–16	8,112
November 29	12:00 p.m.	Toledo	Kelly/Shorts Stadium; Mount Pleasant, MI	ESPN+	L 3–21	6,673
December 26	1:00 p.m.	vs. Northwestern*	Ford Field; Detroit, MI (GameAbove Sports Bowl)	ESPN	L 7–34	27,857
*Non-conference game; Rankings from AP Poll and CFP Rankings released prior to game; All times are in Eastern time

== Game summaries ==
=== at San Jose State ===
Central Michigan Chippewas (0–0) at San Jose State Spartans (0–0) – Game summary

Quarter	1	2	3	4	Total
Chippewas	10	3	0	3	16
Spartans	0	7	7	0	14

at CEFCU Stadium • San Jose, California

- Date: August 29
- Game time: 6:30 PM PDT
- Game weather: Sunny • Temperature: 70 °F (21 °C)
- Game attendance: 14,877
- Referee: Cal McNeill
- TV announcers (FS1): Trent Rush and Will Blackmon

Game information

First quarter

- CMU – Trey Cornist 29-yard run (Cade Graham kick), 3:14. Chippewas 7–0. Drive: 8 plays, 80 yards, 4:28.
- CMU – Cade Graham 34-yard field goal, 0:10. Chippewas 10–0. Drive: 4 plays, -2 yards, 1:56.

Second quarter

- CMU – Cade Graham 28-yard field goal, 8:26. Chippewas 13–0. Drive: 7 plays, 31 yards, 3:37.
- SJSU – Leland Smith 11-yard pass from Walker Eget (Denis Lynch kick), 4:20. Chippewas 13–7. Drive: 8 plays, 74 yards, 3:58.

Third quarter

- SJSU – Danny Scudero 45-yard pass from Walker Eget (Denis Lynch kick), 12:01. Spartans 14–13. Drive: 6 plays, 75 yards, 2:59.

Fourth quarter

- CMU – Cade Graham 28-yard field goal, 4:13. Chippewas 16–14. Drive: 14 plays, 70 yards, 7:16.

Statistics	CMU	SJSU
First downs	20	19
Plays–yards	64–351	69–383
Rushes–yards	51–236	24–75
Passing yards	115	308
Passing: Comp–Att–Int	8–13–0	24–45–2
Turnovers	0	3
Time of possession	33:45	26:15

Team	Category	Player	Statistics
Central Michigan	Passing	Angel H. Flores	3/3, 59 yards
Central Michigan	Rushing	Nahree Biggins	18 carries, 102 yards
Central Michigan	Receiving	Tommy McIntosh	2 receptions, 61 yards
San Jose State	Passing	Walker Eget	24/43, 308 yards, 2 TD, 2 INT
San Jose State	Rushing	Floyd Chalk IV	11 carries, 44 yards
San Jose State	Receiving	Daniel Scudero	9 receptions, 189 yards, TD

=== at Pittsburgh ===
Central Michigan Chippewas (1–0) at Pittsburgh Panthers (1–0) – Game summary

Quarter	1	2	3	4	Total
Chippewas	0	10	7	0	17
Panthers	7	17	7	14	45

at Acrisure Stadium • Pittsburgh, Pennsylvania

- Date: September 6
- Game time: 12:00 PM EDT
- Game weather: Cloudy • Temperature: 66 °F (19 °C) • Wind: SW at 4 miles per hour (6.4 km/h)
- Game attendance: 48,424
- Referee: Justin Elliott
- TV announcers (ESPNU): Brian Custer and Max Starks

Game information

First quarter

- PITT – Raphael Williams Jr. 3-yard pass from Eli Holstein (Trey Butkowski kick), 11:56. Panthers 7–0. Drive: 7 plays, 72 yards, 2:58.

Second quarter

- CMU – Cade Graham 41-yard field goal, 12:28. Panthers 7–3. Drive: 12 plays, 53 yards, 6:42.
- PITT – Justin Holmes 12-yard pass from Eli Holstein (Trey Butkowski kick), 11:03. Panthers 14–3. Drive: 5 plays, 74 yards, 1:20.
- PITT – Josh Altsman 2-yard pass from Eli Holstein (Trey Butkowski kick), 6:40. Panthers 21–3. Drive: 6 plays, 52 yards, 2:20.
- PITT – Trey Butkowski 43-yard field goal, 2:08. Panthers 24–3. Drive: 6 plays, 24 yards, 2:51.
- CMU – Jadyn Glasser 2-yard run (Cade Graham kick), 11:03. Panthers 24–10. Drive: 6 plays, 13 yards, 0:44.

Third quarter

- CMU – DeCorion Temple 2-yard pass from Joe Labas (Cade Graham kick), 3:01. Panthers 24–17. Drive: 11 plays, 63 yards, 7:18.
- PITT – Raphael Williams Jr. 48-yard pass from Eli Holstein (Trey Butkowski kick), 2:15. Panthers 31–17. Drive: 10 plays, 30 yards, 5:06.

Fourth quarter

- PITT – Juelz Goff Jr. 2-yard run (Trey Butkowski kick), 2:15. Panthers 38–17. Drive: 12 plays, 44 yards, 7:29.
- PITT – Ja'Kyrian Turner 2-yard run (Trey Butkowski kick), 0:45. Panthers 45–17. Drive: 8 plays, 69 yards, 2:20.

Statistics	CMU	PITT
First downs	13	22
Plays–yards	68–217	58–465
Rushes–yards	41–40	26–124
Passing yards	177	340
Passing: comp–att–int	27–20–0	32–24–1
Turnovers	1	1
Time of possession	36:43	23:17

Team	Category	Player	Statistics
Central Michigan	Passing	Joe Labas	11/14, 89 yards, TD
Central Michigan	Rushing	Angel H. Flores	9 carries, 18 yards
Central Michigan	Receiving	Camden Kruisenga	1 reception, 26 yards
Pittsburgh	Passing	Eli Holstein	21/28, 304 yards, 4 TD, INT
Pittsburgh	Rushing	Desmond Reid	10 carries, 46 yards
Pittsburgh	Receiving	Raphael Williams Jr.	6 receptions, 121 yards, 2 TD

=== at No. 23 Michigan ===
Central Michigan Chippewas (1–1) at No. 23 Michigan Wolverines (1–1) – Game summary

Quarter	1	2	3	4	Total
Chippewas	0	3	0	0	3
No. 23 Wolverines	14	21	14	14	63

at Michigan Stadium • Ann Arbor, Michigan

- Date: September 13
- Game time: 12:00 PM EDT
- Game weather: Cloudy • Temperature: 69 °F (21 °C) • Wind: SW at 5 miles per hour (8.0 km/h)
- Game attendance: 110,740
- Referee: Matthew Richards
- TV announcers (BTN): Jeff Levering, Jake Butt, and Brooke Fletcher

Game information

First quarter

- (10:56) MICH – Justice Haynes 2-yard run, Dominic Zvada kick (Drive: 10 plays, 75 yards, 4:04; Michigan 7–0)
- (7:21) MICH – Semaj Morgan 32-yard pass from Bryce Underwood, Dominic Zvada kick (Drive: 6 plays, 59 yards, 2:28; Michigan 14–0)

Second quarter

- (12:09) MICH – Bryce Underwood 20-yard run, Dominic Zvada kick (Drive: 4 plays, 77 yards, 2:04; Michigan 21–0)
- (9:23) MICH – Andrew Marsh 23-yard run, Dominic Zvada kick (Drive: 2 plays, 34 yards, 0:48; Michigan 28–0)
- (1:51) CMU – Cade Graham 22-yard field goal (Drive: 14 plays, 81 yards, 5:52; Michigan 28–3)
- (0:09) MICH – Jordan Marshall 1-yard run, Dominic Zvada kick (Drive: 11 plays, 79 yards, 1:36; Michigan 35–3)

Third quarter

- (8:27) MICH – Jordan Marshall 4-yard run, Dominic Zvada kick (Drive: 10 plays, 70 yards, 4:29; Michigan 42–3)
- (3:12) MICH – Bryce Underwood 18-yard run, Dominic Zvada kick (Drive: 8 plays, 63 yards, 4:17; Michigan 49–3)

Fourth quarter

- (14:01) MICH – Bryson Kuzdzal 1-yard run, Dominic Zvada kick (Drive: 7 plays, 48 yards, 3:25; Michigan 56–3)
- (9:00) MICH – Jasper Parker 1-yard run, Dominic Zvada kick (Drive: 9 plays, 45 yards, 4:50; Michigan 63–3)

Statistics	CMU	MICH
First downs	8	35
Plays–yards	53–139	80–616
Rushes–yards	33–79	55–381
Passing yards	60	235
Passing: comp–att–int	11–20–1	16–25–1
Turnovers	2	1
Time of possession	26:53	33:07

Team	Category	Player	Statistics
Central Michigan	Passing	Joe Labas	4/8, 36 yards, INT
Central Michigan	Rushing	Angel H. Flores	9 carries, 76 yards
Central Michigan	Receiving	Justin Ruffin Jr.	2 receptions, 23 yards
Michigan	Passing	Bryce Underwood	16/25, 235 yards, TD, INT
Michigan	Rushing	Bryce Underwood	9 carries, 117 yards, 2 TD
Michigan	Receiving	Semaj Morgan	4 receptions, 69 yards, TD

=== Wagner (FCS) ===
Wagner Seahawks (FCS) (0–3) at Central Michigan Chippewas (1–2) – Game summary

Quarter	1	2	3	4	Total
Seahawks (FCS)	0	3	0	7	10
Chippewas	14	21	14	0	49

at Kelly/Shorts Stadium • Mount Pleasant, Michigan

- Date: September 20
- Game time: 1:00 PM EDT
- Game weather: Sunny, 73°F, Northwest wind 8 mph
- Game attendance: 18,787
- Referee: Chris La Mange
- TV announcers (ESPN+): Evan Stockton (play-by-play), Doc Holliday (analyst) and Sam Ramos (sidelines)

Game information

First quarter

- CMU – Dakota Cochran 30-yard interception return (Cade Graham kick), 14:20. Chippewas 7–0. Drive: , 0:40.
- CMU – Angel Flores 2-yard run (Cade Graham kick), 08:15. Chippewas 14–0. Drive: 6 plays, 36 yards, 3:34.

Second quarter

- WAG – Nicholas Romero 33-yard field goal, 08:34. Chippewas 14–3. Drive: 11 plays, 55 yards, 5:07.
- CMU – Nahree Biggins 88-yard pass from Joe Labas (Cade Graham kick), 08:22. Chippewas 21–3. Drive: 1 play, 88 yards, 0:12.
- CMU – Tommy McIntosh 33-yard pass from Joe Labas (Cade Graham kick), 01:41. Chippewas 28–3. Drive: 7 plays, 62 yards, 2:59.
- CMU – Tyson Davis 33-yard pass from Joe Labas (Cade Graham kick), 00:16. Chippewas 35–3. Drive: 7 plays, 80 yards, 0:59.

Third quarter

- CMU – Brock Townsend 22-yard pass from Angel Flores (Cade Graham kick), 05:43. Chippewas 42–3. Drive: 10 plays, 65 yards, 5:45.
- CMU – Angel Flores 3-yard run (Cade Graham kick), 02:54. Chippewas 49–3. Drive: 3 plays, 33 yards, 1:15.

Fourth quarter

- WAG – A. Bailey 75-yard fumble return (Nicholas Romero kick), 13:56. Chippewas 49–10. Drive: , 1:44.

Statistics	WAG	CMU
First downs	7	24
Plays–yards	55–113	66–506
Rushes–yards	35–72	48–233
Passing yards	41	273
Passing: comp–att–int	12–20–1	14–18–0
Turnovers	2	2
Time of possession	27:37	32:23

Team	Category	Player	Statistics
Wagner	Passing	Jordan Barton	7/12, 18 yards
Wagner	Rushing	Matt Morad	9 carries, 35 yards
Wagner	Receiving	Richard Perkins Jr.	3 receptions, 9 yards
Central Michigan	Passing	Joe Labas	12/14, 241 yards, 3 TD
Central Michigan	Rushing	Trey Cornist	11 carries, 52 yards
Central Michigan	Receiving	Nahree Biggins	3 receptions, 106 yards, TD

=== Eastern Michigan (rivalry) ===
Eastern Michigan Eagles (1–3) at Central Michigan Chippewas (2–2) – Game summary

Quarter	1	2	3	4	Total
Eagles	3	3	7	0	13
Chippewas	14	7	0	3	24

at Kelly/Shorts Stadium • Mount Pleasant, Michigan

- Date: September 27
- Game time: 1:00 p.m. EDT
- Game weather: 75 °F (24 °C), sunny, S 3 miles per hour (4.8 km/h)
- Game attendance: 28,605
- Referee: Marcel Kerr
- TV announcers (ESPN+): Doug Sherman (play-by-play) and Marcus Ray (analyst)

Game information

First quarter

- CMU – Brock Townsend 1-yard pass from Joe Labas (Cade Graham kick), 9:36. Chippewas 7–0. Drive: 9 plays, 75 yards, 5:24.
- CMU – Nahree Biggins 49-yard run (Cade Graham kick), 5:03. Chippewas 14–0. Drive: 5 plays, 75 yards, 2:51.
- EMU – Rudy Kessinger 41-yard field goal, 1:25. Chippewas 14–3. Drive: 11 plays, 51 yards, 3:39.

Second quarter

- CMU – Langston Lewis 2-yard pass from Angel Flores (Cade Graham kick), 10:46. Chippewas 21–3. Drive: 12 plays, 75 yards, 5:39.
- EMU – Rudy Kessinger 38-yard field goal, 5:57. Chippewas 21–6. Drive: 12 plays, 69 yards, 4:43.

Third quarter

- EMU – Noah Kim 14-yard run (Rudy Kessinger kick), 10:45. Chippewas 21–13. Drive: 8 plays, 69 yards, 4:09.

Fourth quarter

- CMU – Cade Graham 22-yard field goal, 7:08. Chippewas 24–13. Drive: 14 plays, 72 yards, 7:59.

On September 27, 2025, Central Michigan University (CMU) defeated Eastern Michigan University (EMU) 24–13 in their Mid-American Conference opener at Kramer/Deromedi Field at Kelly/Shorts Stadium, before 28,605 fans—the ninth-largest crowd in stadium history. CMU, led by first-year coach Matt Drinkall, improved to 3–2, while EMU fell to 1–4.

CMU jumped to a 21–3 lead with touchdowns on their first three possessions: a 1-yard pass from Joe Labas to Brock Townsend, a 49-yard run by Nahree Biggins, and a 2-yard pass from Angel Flores to Langston Lewis. EMU responded with two field goals and a 14-yard touchdown run by Noah Kim, narrowing the score to 21–13 in the third quarter. A crucial interception by CMU's Maddix Blackwell and a 14-play, 72-yard drive, capped by a 22-yard field goal from Cade Graham, sealed the 24–13 victory. CMU dominated possession, holding the ball for over 11 minutes in the fourth quarter.

Flores and Biggins led CMU with career-high rushing totals of 134 and 113 yards, respectively, contributing to a season-high 305 rushing yards. Labas completed 14 of 16 passes for 138 yards and a touchdown. For EMU, Noah Kim threw for 175 yards but had one interception.

Statistics	EMU	CMU
First downs	19	22
Plays–yards	52–298	66–451
Rushes–yards	24–123	50–313
Passing yards	175	138
Passing: comp–att–int	17–28–1	14–16–0
Turnovers	1	0
Time of possession	23:36	35:46

Key Player Statistics
Team	Category	Player	Statistics
EMU	Passing	Noah Kim	17/28, 175 yards, INT
EMU	Rushing	Deion McMillan	13 carries, 71 yards
EMU	Receiving	Ben Prosper	3 receptions, 37 yards
CMU	Passing	Joe Labas	14/16, 138 yards, TD
CMU	Rushing	Angel Flores	22 carries, 134 yards
CMU	Receiving	Tommy McIntosh	2 receptions, 59 yards

=== at Akron ===
Central Michigan Chippewas (3–2) at Akron Zips (1–4) – Game summary

Quarter	1	2	3	4	Total
Chippewas	3	7	3	9	22
Zips	0	14	14	0	28

at InfoCision Stadium–Summa Field • Akron, Ohio

- Date: October 4
- Game time: 3:30 p.m. EDT
- Game weather: Sunny
- Game attendance: 8,995
- Referee: Billy Williams
- TV announcers (ESPN+): Michael Reghi (play-by-play) and Ryan Cavanaugh (analyst)

Game information

First quarter

- (5:46) CMU – Cade Graham 46-yard field goal (Drive: 8 plays, 64 yards, 4:45; Central Michigan 3–0)

Second quarter

- (12:15) AKR – Kyan Mason 22-yard pass from Ben Finley, Owen Wiley kick (Drive: 6 plays, 80 yards, 2:23; Akron 7–3)
- (8:34) CMU – Angel Flores 28-yard run, Cade Graham kick (Drive: 7 plays, 77 yards, 1:30; Central Michigan 10–7)
- (3:13) AKR – Jordan Gant 16-yard pass from Ben Finley, Owen Wiley kick (Drive: 11 plays, 73 yards, 5:12; Akron 14–10)

Third quarter

- (10:38) AKR – Max Whisner 1-yard pass from Michael Johnson Jr., Owen Wiley kick (Drive: 8 plays, 84 yards, 4:16; Akron 21–10)
- (3:35) AKR – Conner Cravaack 2-yard pass from Ben Finley, Owen Wiley kick (Drive: 10 plays, 83 yards, 4:47; Akron 28–10)
- (0:02) CMU – Cade Graham 35-yard field goal (Drive: 7 plays, 58 yards, 3:33; Akron 28–13)

Fourth quarter

- (11:35) CMU – Angel Flores 2-yard run (Drive: 6 plays, 37 yards, 2:04; Akron 28–19)
- (1:33) CMU – Cade Graham 47-yard field goal (Drive: 9 plays, 60 yards, 2:34; Akron 28–22)

Statistics	CMU	AKR
First downs	20	20
Plays–yards	65–374	68–417
Rushes–yards	40–238	37–162
Passing yards	136	255
Passing: Comp–Att–Int	14–25–0	20–31–1
Turnovers	0	1
Time of possession	27:42	32:18

Team	Category	Player	Statistics
Central Michigan	Passing	Joe Labas	12/21, 134 yards
Central Michigan	Rushing	Brock Townsend	8 carries, 108 yards
Central Michigan	Receiving	Tyson Davis	3 receptions, 51 yards
Akron	Passing	Ben Finley	18/29, 252 yards, 3 TD, INT
Akron	Rushing	Jordan Gant	32 carries, 176 yards
Akron	Receiving	Kyan Mason	5 receptions, 125 yards, TD

=== at Bowling Green ===
Central Michigan Chippewas (3–3) at Bowling Green Falcons (3–3) – Game summary

Quarter	1	2	3	4	Total
Chippewas	0	17	10	0	27
Falcons	3	3	0	0	6

at Doyt Perry Stadium • Bowling Green, Ohio

- Date: October 18
- Game time: 12:00 p.m. EDT
- Game weather: Sunny • Temperature: 75 °F (24 °C) • Wind: SW at 15 miles per hour (24 km/h)
- Game attendance: 23,105
- Referee: Rick Warne
- TV announcers (CBSSN): Dave Ryan (play-by-play), Adam Breneman (analyst) and Patrick Peterson (sideline)

Game information

First quarter

- (10:43) BGSU – Jackson Kleather 43-yard field goal (Drive: 8 plays, 50 yards, 4:17; Bowling Green 3-0)

Second quarter

- (13:39) CMU – Angel Flores 1-yard run, Cade Graham kick (Drive: 1 play, 1 yard, 0:02; Central Michigan 7-3)
- (8:04) CMU – Angel Flores 6-yard run, Cade Graham kick (Drive: 7 plays, 79 yards, 3:13; Central Michigan 14-3)
- (3:48) CMU – Cade Graham 38-yard field goal (Drive: 4 plays, 7 yards, 2:11; Central Michigan 17-3)
- (0:53) BGSU – Jackson Kleather 49-yard field goal (Drive: 8 plays, 43 yards, 2:50; Central Michigan 17-6)

Third quarter

- (11:06) CMU – Angel Flores 3-yard run, Cade Graham kick (Drive: 7 plays, 75 yards, 3:54; Central Michigan 24-6)
- (7:09) CMU – Cade Graham 47-yard field goal (Drive: 4 plays, 3 yards, 1:52; Central Michigan 27-6)

Fourth quarter

- No scoring plays.

Statistics	CMU	BGSU
First downs	14	14
Plays–yards	51–276	61–310
Rushes–yards	46–203	36–157
Passing yards	73	153
Passing: Comp–Att–Int	3-5-0	17-25-2
Turnovers	0	2
Time of possession	31:20	28:40

Team	Category	Player	Statistics
Central Michigan	Passing	Joe Labas	2/4, 72 yards
Central Michigan	Rushing	Angel Flores	18 carries, 72 yards, 3 TD
Central Michigan	Receiving	Collin Payne	1 reception, 63 yards
Bowling Green	Passing	Lucian Anderson III	17/25, 153 yards, 2 INT
Bowling Green	Rushing	Lucian Anderson III	11 carries, 53 yards
Bowling Green	Receiving	RJ Garcia II	3 receptions, 60 yards

=== UMass ===
UMass Minutemen (0–7) at Central Michigan Chippewas (4–3) – Game summary

Quarter	1	2	3	4	Total
Minutemen	7	3	3	0	13
Chippewas	21	3	14	0	38

at Kelly/Shorts Stadium • Mount Pleasant, Michigan

- Date: October 25
- Game time: 3:30 p.m. EDT
- Game weather: Cloudy • Temperature: 52 °F (11 °C) • Wind: SE at 1 mile per hour (1.6 km/h)
- Game attendance: 20,489
- Referee: Andrew Speciale
- TV announcers (ESPN+): Evan Stockton (play-by-play) and Reggie Walker (analyst)

Game information

First quarter

- (9:48) CMU – Brock Townsend 1-yard run, Cade Graham kick (Drive: 7 plays, 78 yards, 4:05; Central Michigan 7-0)
- (8:05) MASS – Rocko Griffin 43-yard run, Derek Morris kick (Drive: 5 plays, 75 yards, 1:43; 7-7)
- (3:59) CMU – Brock Townsend 5-yard run, Cade Graham kick (Drive: 7 plays, 80 yards, 3:59; Central Michigan 14-7)
- (1:19) CMU – Brock Townsend 9-yard run, Cade Graham kick (Drive: 3 plays, 61 yards, 1:25; Central Michigan 21-7)

Second quarter

- (10:44) CMU – Cade Graham 29-yard field goal (Drive: 8 plays, 53 yards, 3:53; Central Michigan 24-7)
- (0:00) MASS – Derek Morris 29-yard field goal (Drive: 14 plays, 69 yards, 1:51; Central Michigan 24-10)

Third quarter

- (13:07) CMU – Brock Townsend 51-yard pass from Joe Labas, Cade Graham kick (Drive: 3 plays, 75 yards, 1:53; Central Michigan 31-10)
- (7:50) CMU – Nasir Williams 19-yard pass from Joe Labas, Cade Graham kick (Drive: 7 plays, 58 yards, 4:14; Central Michigan 38-10)
- (4:06) MASS – Derek Morris 50-yard field goal (Drive: 12 plays, 50 yards, 3:44; Central Michigan 38-13)

Fourth quarter

- No scoring plays.

Statistics	MASS	CMU
First downs	20	23
Plays–yards	77–292	66–502
Rushes–yards	26–116	53–279
Passing yards	176	223
Passing: Comp–Att–Int	21-51-1	12-13-0
Turnovers	1	1
Time of possession	22:07	37:53

Team	Category	Player	Statistics
UMass	Passing	AJ Hairston	21/51, 176 yards, INT
UMass	Rushing	Rocko Griffin	7 carries, 56 yards, TD
UMass	Receiving	Kezion Dia-Johnson	3 receptions, 41 yards
Central Michigan	Passing	Joe Labas	10/11, 148 yards, 2 TD
Central Michigan	Rushing	Nahree Biggins	10 carries, 94 yards
Central Michigan	Receiving	Brock Townsend	2 receptions, 78 yards, TD

=== at Western Michigan (rivalry) ===
Central Michigan Chippewas (5–3) at Western Michigan Broncos (4–4) – Game summary

Quarter	1	2	3	4	Total
Chippewas	7	7	0	7	21
Broncos	0	7	7	10	24

at Waldo Stadium • Kalamazoo, Michigan

- Date: November 1
- Game time: 4:00 p.m. EDT
- Game weather: Cloudy • Temperature: 48 °F (9 °C) • Wind: SW at 7 miles per hour (11 km/h)
- Game attendance: 29,299
- Referee: Rich Edwards
- TV announcers (ESPNU): Jason Ross Jr. (play-by-play) and Je'Rod Cherry (analyst)

Game information

First quarter

- (2:31) CMU – Nahree Biggins 1-yard run, Cade Graham kick (Drive: 13 plays, 73 yards, 8:55; Central Michigan 7-0)

Second quarter

- (7:43) WMU – Broc Lowry 1-yard run, Palmer Domschke kick (Drive: 9 plays, 41 yards, 5:08; 7-7)
- (7:23) CMU – Langston Lewis 77-yard pass from Joe Labas, Cade Graham kick (Drive: 1 play, 77 yards, 0:10; Central Michigan 14-7)

Third quarter

- (8:43) WMU – Jalen Buckley 9-yard run, Palmer Domschke kick (Drive: 11 plays, 65 yards, 5:20; 14-14)

Fourth quarter

- (14:53) CMU – Tyson Davis 33-yard pass from Marcus Beamon, Cade Graham kick (Drive: 16 plays, 75 yards, 8:50; Central Michigan 21-14)
- (9:01) WMU – Palmer Domschke 46-yard field goal (Drive: 10 plays, 48 yards, 5:52; Central Michigan 21-17)
- (2:08) WMU – Talique Williams 7-yard pass from Broc Lowry, Palmer Domschke kick (Drive: 11 plays, 70 yards, 4:52; Western Michigan 24-21)

Statistics	CMU	WMU
First downs	13	23
Plays–yards	47–240	68–327
Rushes–yards	35–55	44–177
Passing yards	185	150
Passing: Comp–Att–Int	9-12-1	17-24-0
Turnovers	2	1
Time of possession	26:18	33:42

Team	Category	Player	Statistics
Central Michigan	Passing	Joe Labas	8/11, 152 yards, TD, INT
Central Michigan	Rushing	Brock Townsend	9 carries, 26 yards
Central Michigan	Receiving	Langston Lewis	4 receptions, 111 yards, TD
Western Michigan	Passing	Broc Lowry	17/24, 150 yards, TD
Western Michigan	Rushing	Broc Lowry	22 carries, 82 yards, TD
Western Michigan	Receiving	Talique Williams	7 receptions, 48 yards, TD

=== Buffalo ===
Buffalo Bulls (5–4) at Central Michigan Chippewas (5–4) – Game summary

Quarter	1	2	3	4	Total
Bulls	3	7	3	6	19
Chippewas	7	7	10	14	38

at Kelly/Shorts Stadium • Mount Pleasant, Michigan

- Date: November 12
- Game time: 7:00 PM EST
- Game weather: Clear • Temperature: 40 °F (4 °C) • Wind: W at 15 miles per hour (24 km/h)
- Game attendance: 6,833
- Referee: Chris La Mange
- TV announcers (CBSSN): Dave Ryan (play-by-play) and Adam Breneman (analyst)

Game information

First quarter

- (11:41) BUFF – Jack Howes 29-yard field goal (Drive: 4 plays, -2 yards, 0:45; Buffalo 3-0)
- (3:47) CMU – Jordan Kwiatkowski 48-yard interception return, Cade Graham kick (Drive: 5 plays, 43 yards, 2:40; Central Michigan 7-3)

Second quarter

- (2:22) BUFF – Nik McMillan 55-yard pass from Ta'Quan Roberson, Jack Howes kick (Drive: 4 plays, 87 yards, 1:22; Buffalo 10-7)
- (0:48) CMU – Marcus Beamon 1-yard run, Cade Graham kick (Drive: 8 plays, 71 yards, 1:29; Central Michigan 14-10)

Third quarter

- (9:17) CMU – Cade Graham 32-yard field goal (Drive: 7 plays, 45 yards, 3:59; Central Michigan 17-10)
- (4:30) BUFF – Jack Howes 42-yard field goal (Drive: 9 plays, 53 yards, 4:40; Central Michigan 17-13)
- (4:18) CMU – Langston Lewis 75-yard pass from Joe Labas, Cade Graham kick (Drive: 1 play, 75 yards, 0:12; Central Michigan 24-13)

Fourth quarter

- (10:38) CMU – Dakota Cochran 85-yard fumble return, Cade Graham kick (Drive: 1 play, -3 yards, 0:10; Central Michigan 31-13)
- (6:36) CMU – Tommy McIntosh 10-yard pass from Joe Labas, Cade Graham kick (Drive: 6 plays, 41 yards, 3:03; Central Michigan 38-13)
- (1:58) BUFF – Nik McMillan 26-yard pass from Gunnar Gray, two-point pass conversion failed (Drive: 13 plays, 75 yards, 4:38; Central Michigan 38-19)

Statistics	BUFF	CMU
First downs	19	17
Plays–yards	76–398	59–358
Rushes–yards	34–136	34–111
Passing yards	262	247
Passing: Comp–Att–Int	22–42–2	18–25–2
Turnovers	5	2
Time of possession	28:54	31:06

Team	Category	Player	Statistics
Buffalo	Passing	Ta'Quan Roberson	16/33, 208 yards, TD, INT
Buffalo	Rushing	Terrance Shelton Jr.	11 carries, 59 yards
Buffalo	Receiving	Nik McMillan	7 receptions, 122 yards, 2 TD
Central Michigan	Passing	Joe Labas	18/24, 247 yards, 2 TD, 2 INT
Central Michigan	Rushing	Trey Cornist	10 carries, 62 yards
Central Michigan	Receiving	Langston Lewis	6 receptions, 118 yards, TD

=== at Kent State ===
Central Michigan Chippewas (6–4) at Kent State Golden Flashes (4–6) – Game summary

Quarter	1	2	3	4	Total
Chippewas	7	7	0	14	28
Golden Flashes	0	3	0	13	16

at Dix Stadium • Kent, Ohio

- Date: November 19
- Game time: 7:00 PM EST
- Game weather: Partly cloudy • Temperature: 40 °F (4 °C) • Wind: N at 2 miles per hour (3.2 km/h)
- Game attendance: 8,112
- Referee: Billy Williams
- TV announcers (ESPNU): Jack Kizer (play-by-play) and Ryan Cavanaugh (analyst)

Game information

First quarter

- CMU – Tommy McIntosh 1-yard pass from Joe Labas (Cade Graham kick), 2:37. Chippewas 7–0. Drive: 18 plays, 75 yards, 10:53.

Second quarter

- CMU – Brock Townsend 2-yard run (Cade Graham kick), 10:24. Chippewas 14–0. Drive: 8 plays, 34 yards, 4:31.
- KENT – Will Hryszko 36-yard field goal, 0:53. Chippewas 14–3. Drive: 11 plays, 52 yards, 3:22.

Third quarter

- No scoring plays.

Fourth quarter

- KENT – Wayne Harris 59-yard punt return (pass failed), 10:38. Chippewas 14–9.
- CMU – Brock Townsend 10-yard run (Cade Graham kick), 4:41. Chippewas 21–9. Drive: 10 plays, 75 yards, 5:57.
- CMU – DeCorion Temple 19-yard pass from Joe Labas (Cade Graham kick), 3:02. Chippewas 28–9. Drive: 3 plays, 24 yards, 0:57.
- KENT – Dru DeShields 10-yard run (Will Hryszko kick), 1:28. Chippewas 28–16. Drive: 7 plays, 68 yards, 1:29.

Statistics	CMU	KENT
First downs	16	20
Plays–yards	65–297	64–274
Rushes–yards	43–174	36–89
Passing yards	123	185
Passing: Comp–Att–Int	12-22-1	14-28-0
Turnovers	1	1
Time of possession	33:21	26:39

Team	Category	Player	Statistics
Central Michigan	Passing	Joe Labas	11/20, 121 yards, 2 TD, INT
Central Michigan	Rushing	Nahree Biggins	12 carries, 61 yards
Central Michigan	Receiving	Decorion Temple	3 receptions, 34 yards
Kent State	Passing	Dru DeShields	14/28, 185 yards
Kent State	Rushing	Gavin Garcia	15 carries, 77 yards
Kent State	Receiving	Wayne Harris	3 receptions, 56 yards

=== Toledo ===
Toledo Rockets (7–4) at Central Michigan Chippewas (7–4) – Game summary

Quarter	1	2	3	4	Total
Rockets	0	0	7	14	21
Chippewas	0	3	0	0	3

at Kelly/Shorts Stadium • Mount Pleasant, Michigan

- Date: November 29
- Game time: 12:00 p.m EST
- Game attendance: 6,673
- Referee: Rick Warne
- TV announcers (ESPN+): Michael Reghi (play-by-play) and Je'Rod Cherry (analyst)

Game information

First quarter

- No scoring plays.

Second quarter

- CMU – Cade Graham 28-yard field goal, 0:38. Chippewas 3–0. Drive: 12 plays, 87 yards, 5:42.

Third quarter

- TOL – Chip Trayanum 57-yard pass from Kalieb Osborne (Dylan Cunanan kick), 0:10. Rockets 7–3. Drive: 5 plays, 69 yards, 1:50.

Fourth quarter

- TOL – Kenji Christian 9-yard run (Dylan Cunanan kick), 8:41. Rockets 14–3. Drive: 6 plays, 57 yards, 3:20.
- TOL – Chip Trayanum 42-yard run (Dylan Cunanan kick), 1:49. Rockets 21–3. Drive: 1 play, 42 yards, 0:07.

Statistics	TOL	CMU
First downs	18	15
Plays–yards	61–411	66–323
Rushes–yards	37–205	36–81
Passing yards	206	242
Passing: Comp–Att–Int	14-24-0	19-30-1
Turnovers	1	1
Time of possession	28:34	31:26

Team	Category	Player	Statistics
Toledo	Passing	Kalieb Osborne	5/7, 108 yards, TD
Toledo	Rushing	Chip Trayanum	16 carries, 94 yards, TD
Toledo	Receiving	Junior Vandeross III	4 receptions, 71 yards
Central Michigan	Passing	Joe Labas	19/30, 242 yards, INT
Central Michigan	Rushing	Brock Townsend	14 carries, 68 yards
Central Michigan	Receiving	Tommy McIntosh	6 receptions, 83 yards

=== vs. Northwestern (GameAbove Sports Bowl) ===
2025 GameAbove Sports Bowl
Central Michigan Chippewas (7-5) vs. Northwestern Wildcats (6–6) – Game summary

Quarter	1	2	3	4	Total
Chippewas	0	0	0	7	7
Wildcats	0	21	13	0	34

at Ford Field • Detroit, MI

- Date: December 26
- Game time: 1:00 PM EST
- Game attendance: 27,857
- Referee: Ted Pittz
- TV announcers (ESPN): Matt Schumacker (play-by-play), Dustin Fox (analyst) and Ashley Stroehlein (sideline)

Game information

First quarter

- No scoring plays.

Second quarter

- NU – Griffin Wilde 23-yard pass from Preston Stone (Jack Olsen kick), 6:33. Wildcats 7–0. Drive: 3 plays, 29 yards, 1:28.
- NU – Caleb Komolafe 2-yard run (Jack Olsen kick), 3:43. Wildcats 14–0. Drive: 6 plays, 16 yards, 2:41.
- NU – Lawson Albright 23-yard pass from Preston Stone (Jack Olsen kick), 3:31. Wildcats 21–0. Drive: 1 play, 23 yards, 0:07.

Third quarter

- NU – Braden Turner 47-yard fumble return (Jack Olsen kick failed), 12:39. Wildcats 27–0.
- NU – Griffin Wilde 11-yard pass from Preston Stone (Jack Olsen kick), 2:31. Wildcats 34–0. Drive: 10 plays, 92 yards, 5:23.

Fourth quarter

- CMU – Brock Townsend 3-yard pass from Joe Labas (Cade Graham kick), 6:11. Wildcats 34–7. Drive: 10 plays, 86 yards, 5:49.

Statistics	CMU	NU
First downs	15	18
Plays–yards	60–269	61–313
Rushes–yards	34–91	26–77
Passing yards	178	236
Passing: Comp–Att–Int	21-26-1	20-35-1
Turnovers	4	1
Time of possession	32:42	27:18

Team	Category	Player	Statistics
Central Michigan	Passing	Joe Labas	21/25, 178 yards, TD
Central Michigan	Rushing	Trey Cornist	11 carries, 66 yards
Central Michigan	Receiving	Langston Lewis	8 receptions, 83 yards
Northwestern	Passing	Preston Stone	19/31, 226 yards, 3 TD
Northwestern	Rushing	Caleb Komolafe	15 carries, 55 yards, TD
Northwestern	Receiving	Griffin Wilde	10 receptions, 97 yards, 2 TD
