= 2025 Eastern Michigan Eagles football team =

American college football season

2025 Eastern Michigan Eagles football
- Conference: Mid-American Conference
- Record: 4–8 (3–5 MAC)
- Head coach: Chris Creighton (12th season)
- Offensive coordinator: Mike Piatkowski (3rd season)
- Offensive scheme: Spread
- Defensive coordinator: Ben Needham (3rd season)
- Base defense: 4–2–5
- Home stadium: Rynearson Stadium

2025 Mid-American Conference football standings
	Conf.			Overall
Team	W		L	W		L
Western Michigan y$	7	–	1	10	–	4
Miami (OH) y	6	–	2	7	–	7
Ohio	6	–	2	9	–	4
Toledo	6	–	2	8	–	5
Central Michigan	5	–	3	7	–	6
Akron*	4	–	4	5	–	7
Buffalo	4	–	4	5	–	7
Kent State	4	–	4	5	–	7
Eastern Michigan	3	–	5	4	–	8
Ball State	3	–	5	4	–	8
Bowling Green	2	–	6	4	–	8
Northern Illinois	2	–	6	3	–	9
UMass	0	–	8	0	–	12
Championship: Western Michigan 23, Miami (OH) 13
$ – Conference champion; y – Championship game participant; * Ineligible for postseason play due to low APR score

The 2025 Eastern Michigan Eagles football team represented Eastern Michigan University in the Mid-American Conference (MAC) during the 2025 NCAA Division I FBS football season. The Eagles were led by Chris Creighton in his 12th year as the head coach. The Eagles played their home games at Rynearson Stadium, located in Ypsilanti, Michigan.

== Preseason ==
The MAC Football Kickoff was held on Thursday, July 24, 2025, at the Ford Field in Detroit, Michigan from 9:00 am EDT to 1:30 pm EDT.

=== Preseason polls ===
==== Coaches Poll ====
On July 24 the MAC announced the preseason coaches' poll. Eastern Michigan was picked to finish eighth.

== Schedule ==
Date	Time	Opponent	Site	TV	Result	Attendance
August 30	8:00 p.m.	at Texas State*	UFCU Stadium; San Marcos, TX	ESPN+	L 27–52	21,082
September 6	7:00 p.m.	LIU*	Rynearson Stadium; Ypsilanti, MI	ESPN+	L 23–28	15,313
September 13	7:30 p.m.	at Kentucky*	Kroger Field; Lexington, KY	ESPNU	L 23–48	58,489
September 20	3:30 p.m.	Louisiana*^{†}	Rynearson Stadium; Ypsilanti, MI	ESPN+	W 34–31	18,371
September 27	1:00 p.m.	at Central Michigan	Kelly/Shorts Stadium; Mount Pleasant, MI (rivalry, Michigan MAC Trophy)	ESPN+	L 13–24	28,605
October 4	3:30 p.m.	at Buffalo	University at Buffalo Stadium; Amherst, NY	ESPN+	L 30–31 ^{OT}	17,300
October 11	1:00 p.m.	Northern Illinois	Rynearson Stadium; Ypsilanti, MI	ESPN+	W 16–10	15,676
October 18	12:00 p.m.	at Miami (OH)	Yager Stadium; Oxford, OH	ESPN+	L 30–44	6,832
October 25	12:00 p.m.	Ohio	Rynearson Stadium; Ypsilanti, MI	CBSSN	L 21–28	15,985
November 8	1:00 p.m.	Bowling Green	Rynearson Stadium; Ypsilanti, MI	ESPN+	W 27–21	11,889
November 15	12:00 p.m.	at Ball State	Scheumann Stadium; Muncie, IN	ESPN+	W 24–9	8,430
November 25	7:30 p.m.	Western Michigan	Rynearson Stadium; Ypsilanti, MI (Michigan MAC Trophy)	ESPN2	L 21–31	11,818
*Non-conference game; ^{†}Homecoming; All times are in Eastern time

== Game summaries ==
=== at Texas State ===
Eastern Michigan Eagles (0–0) at Texas State Bobcats (0–0) – Game summary

Quarter	1	2	3	4	Total
Eagles	3	14	0	10	27
Bobcats	14	10	14	14	52

at UFCU Stadium • San Marcos, Texas

- Date: August 30
- Game time: 7:00 PM CDT
- Game weather: Sunny, 92 °F (33 °C)
- Game attendance: 21,082
- Referee: Jeremy Parker
- TV announcers (ESPN+): Brant Freeman (play-by-play) and Bill Culhane (analyst)

Game information

First quarter

- TXST – Beau Sparks 16-yard pass from Brad Jackson (Tyler Robles kick), 13:19. Bobcats 7–0. Drive: 4 plays, 75 yards, 1:41.
- EMU – Rudy Kessinger 24-yard field goal, 8:47. Bobcats 7–3. Drive: 9 plays, 68 yards, 4:32.
- TXST – Beau Sparks 15-yard pass from Brad Jackson (Tyler Robles kick), 6:41. Bobcats 14–3. Drive: 6 plays, 75 yards, 2:06.

Second quarter

- EMU – Tavierre Dunlap 2-yard run (Rudy Kessinger kick), 13:33. Bobcats 14–10. Drive: 8 plays, 80 yards, 3:24.
- TXST – Tyler Robles 24-yard field goal, 8:39. Bobcats 17–10. Drive: 12 plays, 68 yards, 4:54.
- TXST – Lincoln Pare 22-yard run (Tyler Robles kick), 3:56. Bobcats 24–10. Drive: 5 plays, 92 yards, 3:00.
- EMU – Joshua Long 16-yard pass from Noah Kim (Rudy Kessinger kick), 0:12. Bobcats 24–17. Drive: 11 plays, 65 yards, 3:44.

Third quarter

- TXST – Beau Sparks 3-yard pass from Brad Jackson (Tyler Robles kick), 7:18. Bobcats 31–17. Drive: 10 plays, 80 yards, 4:58.
- TXST – Beau Sparks 5-yard pass from Brad Jackson (Tyler Robles kick), 0:19. Bobcats 38–17. Drive: 9 plays, 66 yards, 5:23.

Fourth quarter

- TXST – Greg Burrell 15-yard run (Tyler Robles kick), 12:19. Bobcats 45–17. Drive: 5 plays, 35 yards, 2:19.
- EMU – Rudy Kessinger 37-yard field goal, 6:29. Bobcats 45–20. Drive: 10 plays, 56 yards, 5:50.
- TXST – Jaylen Jenkins 58-yard run (Tyler Robles kick), 4:02. Bobcats 52–20. Drive: 5 plays, 74 yards, 2:25.
- EMU – Joey Mattord 7-yard run (Rudy Kessinger kick), 0:41. Bobcats 52–27. Drive: 13 plays, 75 yards, 3:21.

Statistics	EMU	TXST
First downs	23	30
Plays–yards	67–391	66–606
Rushes–yards	33–143	39–392
Passing yards	248	214
Passing: Comp–Att–Int	23–34–0	18–27–0
Turnovers	0	0
Time of possession	29:02	30:58

Team	Category	Player	Statistics
Eastern Michigan	Passing	Noah Kim	23/34, 248 yards, TD
Eastern Michigan	Rushing	Dontae McMillan	9 carries, 78 yards
Eastern Michigan	Receiving	Terry Lockett Jr.	5 receptions, 62 yards
Texas State	Passing	Brad Jackson	18/26, 214 yards, 4 TD
Texas State	Rushing	Lincoln Pare	12 carries, 167 yards, TD
Texas State	Receiving	Beau Sparks	7 receptions, 82 yards, 4 TD

=== LIU (FCS) ===
LIU Sharks (FCS) (0–1) at Eastern Michigan Eagles (0–1) – Game summary

Quarter	1	2	3	4	Total
Sharks (FCS)	7	7	0	14	28
Eagles	3	7	0	13	23

at Rynearson Stadium • Ypsilanti, Michigan

- Date: September 6
- Game time: 7:00 PM EDT
- Game weather: Cloudy • Temperature: 63 °F (17 °C) • Wind: W at 4 miles per hour (6.4 km/h)
- Game attendance: 15,313
- Referee: Gregory Gompf
- TV announcers (ESPN+): Dan Gutowsky (play-by-play) and Ryan Cavanaugh (analyst)

Game information

First quarter

- LIU – Ethan Greenwood 65-yard run (Lance Maiberg kick), 10:46. Sharks 7–0. Drive: 5 plays, 90 yards, 2:17.
- EMU – Rudy Kessinger 32-yard field goal, 6:43. Sharks 7–3. Drive: 10 plays, 58 yards, 3:56.

Second quarter

- LIU – Ethan Greenwood 2-yard run (Lance Maiberg kick), 13:34. Sharks 14–3. Drive: 6 plays, 86 yards, 3:31.
- EMU – Dontae McMillan 33-yard pass from Noah Kim (Rudy Kessinger kick), 10:19. Sharks 14–10. Drive: 8 plays, 70 yars, 3:10.

Third quarter

- No scoring plays.

Fourth quarter

- LIU – Luca Stanzani 14-yard run (Lance Maiberg kick), 12:21. Sharks 21–10. Drive: 1 play, 14 yards, 0:06.
- EMU – Dontae McMillan 40-yard run (pass failed), 11:40. Sharks 21–16. Drive: 2 plays, 59 yards, 0:31.
- LIU – Luca Stanzani 2-yard run (Lance Maiberg kick), 1:56. Sharks 28–16. Drive: 16 plays, 75 yards, 9:44.
- EMU – Jamarien Wheeler 5-yard pass from Noah Kim (Rudy Kessinger kick), 0:41. Sharks 28–23. Drive: 8 plays, 56 yards, 1:08.

Statistics	LIU	EMU
First downs	21	17
Plays–yards	69–479	54–311
Rushes–yards	45–231	25–122
Passing yards	248	189
Passing: Comp–Att–Int	15-24-0	18–29–0
Turnovers	0	0
Time of possession	37:53	22:07

Team	Category	Player	Statistics
LIU	Passing	Luca Stanzani	12/18, 143 yards
LIU	Rushing	Ethan Greenwood	7 carries, 91 yards, 2 TD
LIU	Receiving	Luca Stanzani	1 reception, 74 yards
Eastern Michigan	Passing	Noah Kim	18/29, 189 yards, 2 TD
Eastern Michigan	Rushing	Dontae McMillan	8 carries, 58 yards, TD
Eastern Michigan	Receiving	Terry Lockett Jr.	8 receptions, 78 yards

=== at Kentucky ===
Eastern Michigan Eagles (0–2) at Kentucky Wildcats (1–1) – Game summary

Quarter	1	2	3	4	Total
Eagles	3	13	0	7	23
Wildcats	14	14	10	10	48

at Kroger Field • Lexington, Kentucky

- Date: September 13
- Game time: 7:30 PM EDT
- Game weather: Clear • Temperature: 79 °F (26 °C)
- Game attendance: 58,489
- Referee: Ken Williamson
- TV announcers (ESPNU): Clay Matvick (play-by-play) and Chase Daniel (analyst)

Game information

First quarter

- UK – Seth McGowan 4 yard-run (Jacob Kauwe kick), 14:11. Wildcats 7–0. Drive: 2 plays, 10 yards, 0:39.
- UK – Seth McGowan 12-yard run (Jacob Kauwe kick), 5:32. Wildcats 14–0. Drive: 11 plays, 79 yards, 5:09.
- EMU – Rudy Kessinger 38-yard field goal, 02:20. Wildcats 14–3. Drive: 8 plays, 55 yards, 3:12.

Second quarter

- UK – Willie Rodriguez 3-yard pass from Cutter Boley (Jacob Kauwe kick), 10:18. Wildcats 21–3. Drive: 5 plays, 54 yards, 1:52.
- EMU – Rudy Kessinger 37-yard field goal, 5:19. Wildcats 21–6. Drive: 10 plays, 56 yards, 4:59.
- UK – Josh Kattus 4-yard pass from Cutter Boley (Jacob Kauwe kick), 1:55. Wildcats 28–6. Drive: 7 plays, 75 yards, 3:23.
- EMU – Terry Lockett Jr. 64-yard pass from Noah Kim (Rudy Kessinger kick), 1:36. Wildcats 28–13. Drive: 3 plays, 75 yards, 0:19.
- EMU – Rudy Kessinger 50-yard field goal, 0:03. Wildcats 28–16. Drive: 5 plays, 34 yards, 0:47.

Third quarter

- UK – Jacob Kauwe 51-yard field goal, 8:13. Wildcats 31–16. Drive: 7 plays, 30 yards, 2:38.
- UK – Seth McGowan 8-yard run (J.Kauwe kick), 5:15. Wildcats 38–16. Drive: 4 plays, 27 yards, 1:21.

Fourth quarter

- UK – Jacob Kauwe 24-yard field goal, 13:16, Wildcats 41–16. Drive: 7 plays, 51 yards, 3:38.
- UK – Jason Patterson 6-yard run (Jacob Kauwe kick), 4:46. Wildcats 48–16. Drive: 10 plays, 63 yards, 5:20.
- EMU – Noah Kim 5-yard run (Rudy Kessinger kick), 0:58. Wildcats 48–23. Drive: 12 plays, 75 yards, 3:48.

Statistics	EMU	UK
First downs	21	24
Plays–yards	77-461	69-492
Rushes–yards	30-131	46-252
Passing yards	330	240
Passing: comp–att–int	25-43-1	12-21-0
Turnovers	1	0
Time of possession	30:04	29:55

Team	Category	Player	Statistics
Eastern Michigan	Passing	Noah Kim	25/42, 330 yards, TD, INT
Eastern Michigan	Rushing	Dontae McMillan	13 carries, 83 yards
Eastern Michigan	Receiving	Terry Lockett Jr.	3 receptions, 90 yards, TD
Kentucky	Passing	Cutter Boley	12/21, 240 yards, 2 TD
Kentucky	Rushing	Seth McGowan	18 carries, 104 yards, 3 TD
Kentucky	Receiving	Josh Kattus	3 receptions, 61 yards, TD

=== Louisiana ===
Louisiana Ragin' Cajuns (1–2) at Eastern Michigan Eagles (0–3) – Game summary

Quarter	1	2	3	4	Total
Ragin' Cajuns	7	10	7	7	31
Eagles	7	14	0	13	34

at Rynearson Stadium • Ypsilanti, Michigan

- Date: September 20
- Game time: 3:30 p.m. EDT
- Game weather: Sunny • Temperature: 79 °F (26 °C) • Wind: E at 7 miles per hour (11 km/h)
- Game attendance: 18,371
- Referee: Tim Barker
- TV announcers (ESPN+): Jason Ross Jr. (play-by-play) and Tyoka Jackson (analyst)

Game information

First quarter

- (11:32) LA – Zylan Perry 23-yard run, Tony Sterner kick (Drive: 7 plays, 75 yards, 3:28; Louisiana 7–0)
- (5:07) EMU – Noah Kim 3-yard run, Rudy Kessinger kick (Drive: 8 plays, 54 yards, 3:31; Tied 7–7)

Second quarter

- (14:56) LA – Tony Sterner 38-yard field goal (Drive: 12 plays, 54 yards, 5:11; Louisiana 10–7)
- (12:31) EMU – Tavierre Dunlap 2-yard run, Rudy Kessinger kick (Drive: 5 plays, 60 yards, 2:17; Eastern Michigan 14–10)
- (9:32) LA – Bill Davis 45-yard run, Tony Sterner kick (Drive: 7 plays, 75 yards, 2:53; Louisiana 17–14)
- (1:13) EMU – Joshua Long 15-yard pass from Noah Kim, Rudy Kessinger kick (Drive: 7 plays, 52 yards, 2:11; Eastern Michigan 21–17)

Third quarter

- (5:20) LA – Courtline Flowers 35-yard interception return, Tony Sterner kick (Louisiana 24–21)

Fourth quarter

- (14:55) EMU – Tavierre Dunlap 6-yard run, Rudy Kessinger kick (Drive: 11 plays, 75 yards, 5:25; Eastern Michigan 28–24)
- (10:16) EMU – Rudy Kessinger 49-yard field goal (Drive: 4 plays, 6 yards, 2:06; Eastern Michigan 31–24)
- (0:47) LA – Zylan Perry 10-yard run, Tony Sterner kick (Drive: 7 plays, 65 yards, 1:21; Tied 31–31)
- (0:03) EMU – Rudy Kessinger 42-yard field goal (Drive: 7 plays, 41 yards, 0:41; Eastern Michigan 34–31)

Statistics	LA	EMU
First downs	22	20
Plays–yards	67–451	67–409
Rushes–yards	32–214	36–183
Passing yards	237	226
Passing: Comp–Att–Int	21–35–2	21–31–1
Turnovers	2	1
Time of possession	29:59	30:01

Team	Category	Player	Statistics
Louisiana	Passing	Daniel Beale	20/33, 232 yards, 2 INT
Louisiana	Rushing	Zylan Perry	15 carries, 110 yards, 2 TD
Louisiana	Receiving	Shelton Sampson Jr.	3 receptions, 87 yards
Eastern Michigan	Passing	Noah Kim	21/31, 226 yards, TD, INT
Eastern Michigan	Rushing	Dontae McMillan	19 carries, 126 yards
Eastern Michigan	Receiving	Nick Devereaux	4 receptions, 76 yards

=== at Central Michigan (rivalry) ===
Eastern Michigan Eagles (1–3) at Central Michigan Chippewas (2–2) – Game summary

Quarter	1	2	3	4	Total
Eagles	3	3	7	0	13
Chippewas	14	7	0	3	24

at Kelly/Shorts Stadium • Mount Pleasant, Michigan

- Date: September 27
- Game time: 1:00 p.m. EDT
- Game weather: Sunny • Temperature: 75 °F (24 °C) • Wind: S at 3 miles per hour (4.8 km/h)
- Game attendance: 28,605
- Referee: Marcel Kerr
- TV announcers (ESPN+): Doug Sherman (play-by-play) and Marcus Ray (analyst)

Game information

First quarter

- CMU – Brock Townsend 1-yard pass from Joe Labas (Cade Graham kick), 9:36. Chippewas 7–0. Drive: 9 plays, 75 yards, 5:24.
- CMU – Nahree Biggins 49-yard run (Cade Graham kick), 5:03. Chippewas 14–0. Drive: 5 plays, 75 yards, 2:51.
- EMU – Rudy Kessinger 41-yard field goal, 1:25. Chippewas 14–3. Drive: 11 plays, 51 yards, 3:39.

Second quarter

- CMU – Langston Lewis 2-yard pass from Angel Flores (Cade Graham kick), 10:46. Chippewas 21–3. Drive: 12 plays, 75 yards, 5:39.
- EMU – Rudy Kessinger 38-yard field goal, 5:57. Chippewas 21–6. Drive: 12 plays, 69 yards, 4:43.

Third quarter

- EMU – Noah Kim 14-yard run (Rudy Kessinger kick), 10:45. Chippewas 21–13. Drive: 8 plays, 69 yards, 4:09.

Fourth quarter

- CMU – Cade Graham 22-yard field goal, 7:08. Chippewas 24–13. Drive: 14 plays, 72 yards, 7:59.

Statistics	EMU	CMU
First downs	19	22
Plays–yards	52–298	66–451
Rushes–yards	24–123	50–313
Passing yards	175	138
Passing: comp–att–int	17–28–1	14–16–0
Turnovers	1	0
Time of possession	23:36	35:46

Team	Category	Player	Statistics
Eastern Michigan	Passing	Noah Kim	17/28, 175 yards, INT
Eastern Michigan	Rushing	Dontae McMilan	13 carries, 71 yards
Eastern Michigan	Receiving	Ben Prosper	3 receptions, 37 yards
Central Michigan	Passing	Joe Labas	14/16, 138 yards, TD
Central Michigan	Rushing	Angel Flores	22 carries, 134 yards
Central Michigan	Receiving	Tommy McIntosh	2 receptions, 59 yards

=== at Buffalo ===
Eastern Michigan Eagles (1–4) at Buffalo Bulls (2–3) – Game summary

Quarter	1	2	3	4	OT	Total
Eagles	7	7	7	3	6	30
Bulls	7	7	7	3	7	31

at University at Buffalo Stadium • Amherst, New York

- Date: October 4
- Game time: 3:30 p.m. EDT
- Game weather: Sunny • Temperature: 79 °F (26 °C) • Wind: SW at 6 miles per hour (9.7 km/h)
- Game attendance: 17,300
- Referee: Andrew Speciale
- TV announcers (ESPN+): Shawn Kenney (play-by-play) and Marcus Ray (analyst)

Game information

First quarter

- (8:50) EMU – Nick Devereaux 45-yard pass from Noah Kim, Rudy Kessinger kick (Drive: 8 plays, 99 yards, 3:53; Eastern Michigan 7-0)
- (8:39) BUFF – Victor Snow 75-yard pass from Ta'Quan Roberson, Jack Howes kick (Drive: 1 play, 75 yards, 0:11; 7-7)

Second quarter

- (8:44) EMU – Dontae McMillan 3-yard run, Rudy Kessinger kick (Drive: 17 plays, 94 yards, 7:07; Eastern Michigan 14-7)
- (1:51) BUFF – Patrick Clacks III 7-yard pass from Ta'Quan Roberson, Jack Howes kick (Drive: 15 plays, 75 yards, 6:53; 14-14)

Third quarter

- (3:11) EMU – Dontae McMillan 38-yard pass from Noah Kim, Rudy Kessinger kick (Drive: 10 plays, 96 yards, 5:14; Eastern Michigan 21-14)
- (0:02) BUFF – Victor Snow 19-yard pass from Ta'Quan Roberson, Jack Howes kick (Drive: 8 plays, 75 yards, 3:09; 21-21)

Fourth quarter

- (8:59) EMU – Rudy Kessinger 42-yard field goal (Drive: 4 plays, -18 yards, 1:31; Eastern Michigan 24-21)
- (0:00) BUFF – Jack Howes 50-yard field goal (Drive: 11 plays, 59 yards, 0:58; 24-24)

Overtime

- BUFF – Victor Snow 9-yard run, Jack Howes kick (Drive: 3 play, 25 yards Buffalo 31-24)
- EMU – Noah Kim 1-yard run, two-point run conversion failed (Drive: 3 plays, 25 yards Buffalo 31-30)

Statistics	EMU	BUFF
First downs	25	21
Plays–yards	85–395	70–387
Rushes–yards	54–227	31–115
Passing yards	168	272
Passing: Comp–Att–Int	19–31–0	19–39–0
Turnovers	0	1
Time of possession	37:05	22:55

Team	Category	Player	Statistics
Eastern Michigan	Passing	Noah Kim	19/31, 168 yards, 2 TD
Eastern Michigan	Rushing	Dontae McMillan	20 carries, 117 yards, TD
Eastern Michigan	Receiving	Nick Devereaux	3 receptions, 62 yards, TD
Buffalo	Passing	Ta'Quan Roberson	19/38, 272 yards, 3 TD
Buffalo	Rushing	Al-Jay Henderson	16 carries, 81 yards
Buffalo	Receiving	Victor Snow	6 receptions, 136 yards, 2 TD

=== Northern Illinois ===
Northern Illinois Huskies (1–4) at Eastern Michigan Eagles (1–5) – Game summary

Quarter	1	2	3	4	Total
Huskies	0	3	7	0	10
Eagles	3	3	0	10	16

at Rynearson Stadium • Ypsilanti, Michigan

- Date: October 11
- Game time: 1:00 p.m.
- Game weather: Cloudy • Temperature: 61 °F (16 °C) • Wind: N at 8 miles per hour (13 km/h)
- Game attendance: 15.676
- Referee: Jason Perkins
- TV announcers (ESPN+): Doug Sherman (play-by-play) and Barrett Brooks (analyst)

Game information

First quarter

- (7:16) EMU – Rudy Kessinger 35-yard field goal (Drive: 14 plays, 63 yards, 4:37; Eastern Michigan 3-0)

Second quarter

- (13:40) NIU – Andrew Glass 30-yard field goal (Drive: 15 plays, 62 yards, 8:36; 3-3)
- (1:42) EMU – Rudy Kessinger 49-yard field goal (Drive: 11 plays, 47 yards, 3:39; Eastern Michigan 6-3)

Third quarter

- (4:26) NIU – Telly Johnson Jr. 80-yard run, Andrew Glass kick (Drive: 1 play, 80 yards, 0:14; Northern Illinois 10-6)

Fourth quarter

- (8:31) EMU – Joshua Long 6-yard pass from Noah Kim, Rudy Kessinger kick (Drive: 9 plays, 64 yards, 4:15; Eastern Michigan 13-10)
- (5:40) EMU – Rudy Kessinger 28-yard field goal (Drive: 4 plays, 5 yards, 2:08; Eastern Michigan 16-10)

Statistics	NIU	EMU
First downs	15	17
Plays–yards	65–332	70–296
Rushes–yards	39–238	38–149
Passing yards	94	147
Passing: Comp–Att–Int	11–26–1	19–32–1
Turnovers	1	1
Time of possession	29:54	30:06

Team	Category	Player	Statistics
Northern Illinois	Passing	Brady Davidson	11/26, 94 yards, INT
Northern Illinois	Rushing	Telly Johnson Jr.	12 carries, 159 yards, TD
Northern Illinois	Receiving	Gary Givens	3 receptions, 42 yards
Eastern Michigan	Passing	Noah Kim	19/32, 147 yards, TD, INT
Eastern Michigan	Rushing	Dontae McMillan	23 carries, 104 yards
Eastern Michigan	Receiving	Joshua Long	5 receptions, 52 yards, TD

=== at Miami (OH) ===
Eastern Michigan Eagles (2–5) at Miami RedHawks (3–3) – Game summary

Quarter	1	2	3	4	Total
Eagles	0	14	0	16	30
RedHawks	7	14	7	16	44

at Yager Stadium • Oxford, Ohio

- Date: October 18
- Game time: 12:00 p.m. EDT
- Game weather: Sunny • Temperature: 71 °F (22 °C) • Wind: N at 7 miles per hour (11 km/h)
- Game attendance: 6,832
- Referee: Billy Williams
- TV announcers (ESPN+): Eric Rothman (play-by-play) and Marcus Ray (analyst)

Game information

First quarter

- (5:25) M-OH – Jordan Brunson 1-yard run, Dom Dzioban kick (Drive: 11 plays, 69 yards, 6:17; Miami (OH) 7–0)

Second quarter

- (7:41) M-OH – Josh Ringer 3-yard pass from Dequan Finn, Dom Dzioban kick (Drive: 20 plays, 66 yards, 11:20; Miami (OH) 14–0)
- (6:46) EMU – Harold Mack 51-yard pass from Noah Kim, Rudy Kessinger kick (Drive: 3 plays, 75 yards, 0:55; Miami (OH) 14–7)
- (4:17) M-OH – Brian Shane 20-yard pass from Dequan Finn, Dom Dzioban kick (Drive: 5 plays, 75 yards, 2:29; Miami (OH) 21–7)
- (0:26) EMU – Harold Mack 12-yard pass from Noah Kim, Rudy Kessinger kick (Drive: 8 plays, 84 yards, 1:23; Miami (OH) 21–14)

Third quarter

- (5:28) M-OH – Dequan Finn 1-yard run, Dom Dzioban kick (Drive: 6 plays, 62 yards, 3:09; Miami (OH) 28–14)

Fourth quarter

- (14:35) M-OH – Dequan Finn 4-yard run, Dom Dzioban kick (Drive: 9 plays, 55 yards, 4:21; Miami (OH) 35–14)
- (14:07) M-OH – Team safety (Miami (OH) 37–14)
- (9:07) EMU – Nick Devereaux 19-yard pass from Noah Kim, Noah Kim pass to Porter Rooks for two-point conversion (Drive: 6 plays, 74 yards, 2:08; Miami (OH) 37–22)
- (3:52) M-OH – D'Shawntae Jones 2-yard run, Dom Dzioban kick (Drive: 9 plays, 75 yards, 5:15; Miami (OH) 44–22)
- (0:58) EMU – Nick Devereaux 21-yard pass from Noah Kim, Noah Kim pass to Joshua Long for two-point conversion (Drive: 13 plays, 82 yards, 2:50; Miami (OH) 44–30)

Statistics	EMU	M-OH
First downs	17	23
Plays–yards	58–369	77–454
Rushes–yards	22–60	55–295
Passing yards	309	159
Passing: Comp–Att–Int	20-36-2	13-22-0
Turnovers	2	1
Time of possession	17:51	42:09

Team	Category	Player	Statistics
Eastern Michigan	Passing	Noah Kim	20/36, 309 yards, 4 TD, 2 INT
Eastern Michigan	Rushing	Dontae McMillan	11 carries, 37 yards
Eastern Michigan	Receiving	Harold Mack	6 receptions, 179 yards, 2 TD
Miami (OH)	Passing	Dequan Finn	13/22, 159 yards, 2 TD
Miami (OH)	Rushing	Jordan Brunson	23 carries, 122 yards, TD
Miami (OH)	Receiving	Brian Shane	4 receptions, 56 yards, TD

=== Ohio ===
Ohio Bobcats (4–3) at Eastern Michigan Eagles (2–6) – Game summary

Quarter	1	2	3	4	Total
Bobcats	7	0	7	14	28
Eagles	14	0	0	7	21

at Rynearson Stadium • Ypsilanti, Michigan

- Date: October 25
- Game time: 12:00 p.m.
- Game weather: sunny, Temperature:48 °F (9 °C), Wind: S 5 mph
- Game attendance: 15,985
- Referee: Rick Warne
- TV announcers (CBSSN): Jordan Kent (play-by-play) and Logan Ryan (analyst)

Game information

First quarter

- (11:07) EMU – Nick Devereaux 38-yard pass from Noah Kim (Rudy Kessinger Kick), 9 plays, 75 yards, 3:53; EMU 7–0
- (08:08) OHIO – Chase Hendricks 28-yard pass from Parker Navarro (Brack Peacock kick), 6 plays, 83 yards, 2:52; Tied 7–7
- (05:01) EMU – Noah Kim 3-yard run (Rudy Kessinger Kick), 6 plays, 72 yards, 2:59; EMU 14–7

Second quarter

- No scoring plays

Third quarter

- (04:01) OHIO – Sieh Bangura 1-yard run (Brack Peacock kick), 10 plays, 67 yards, 5:45; Tied 14–14

Fourth quarter

- (13:36) OHIO – Chase Hendricks 14-yard pass from Parker Navarro (Brack Peacock kick), 6 plays, 70 yards, 2:37; OHIO 21–14
- (02:15) OHIO – Sieh Bangura 2-yard run (Brack Peacock kick), 6 plays, 69 yards, 2:35; OHIO 28–14
- (01:38) EMU – Nick Devereaux 17-yard pass from Noah Kim (Rudy Kessinger Kick), 4 plays, 75 yards, 0:36; OHIO 28–21

Statistics	OHIO	EMU
First downs	25	17
Plays–yards	74–487	55–371
Rushes–yards	45–172	25–112
Passing yards	315	259
Passing: Comp–Att–Int	23–29–2	21–30–0
Turnovers	2	1
Time of possession	35:40	24:20

Team	Category	Player	Statistics
Ohio	Passing	Parker Navarro	23/28, 315 yards, 2 TD, 2 INT
Ohio	Rushing	Sieh Bangura	18 carries, 100 yards, 2 TD
Ohio	Receiving	Chase Hendricks	10 receptions, 112 yards, 2 TD
Eastern Michigan	Passing	Noah Kim	21/30, 259 yards, 2 TD
Eastern Michigan	Rushing	Dontae McMillian	10 carries, 49 yards
Eastern Michigan	Receiving	Nick Devereaux	5 receptions, 121 yards, 2 TD

=== Bowling Green ===
Bowling Green Falcons (3–6) at Eastern Michigan Eagles (2–7) – Game summary

Quarter	1	2	3	4	Total
Falcons	7	7	0	7	21
Eagles	10	0	7	10	27

at Rynearson Stadium • Ypsilanti, Michigan

- Date: November 8
- Game time: 1:00 p.m. EDT
- Game weather: Cloudy • Temperature: 46 °F (8 °C) • Wind: N at 6 miles per hour (9.7 km/h)
- Game attendance: 11,889
- Referee: Andrew Speciale
- TV announcers (ESPN+): Michael Reghi (play-by-play) and Ryan Cavanaugh (analyst)

Game information

First quarter

- (10:12) EMU – Tavierre Dunlap 1-yard run, Rudy Kessinger kick (Drive: 9 plays, 59 yards, 3:23; Eastern Michigan 7–0)
- (8:36) BGSU – Austyn Dendy 19-yard run, Jackson Kleather kick (Drive: 4 plays, 35 yards, 1:24; 7–7)
- (3:13) EMU – Rudy Kessinger 27-yard field goal (Drive: 13 plays, 74 yards, 5:17; Eastern Michigan 10–7)

Second quarter

- (3:00) BGSU – Austyn Dendy 16-yard run, Jackson Kleather kick (Drive: 6 plays, 76 yards, 3:43; Bowling Green 14–10)

Third quarter

- (5:57) EMU – Nick Devereaux 12-yard pass from Noah Kim, Rudy Kessinger kick (Drive: 7 plays, 60 yards, 4:01; Eastern Michigan 17–10)

Fourth quarter

- (10:18) EMU – Dontae McMillan 8-yard run, Rudy Kessinger kick (Drive: 6 plays, 69 yards, 3:13; Eastern Michigan 24–14)
- (4:36) BGSU – Jyrin Johnson 2-yard pass from Hunter Najm, Jackson Kleather kick (Drive: 10 plays, 70 yards, 5:35; Bowling Green 24–21)
- (0:57) EMU – Rudy Kessinger 44-yard field goal (Drive: 10 plays, 42 yards, 3:39; Eastern Michigan 27–21)

Statistics	BGSU	EMU
First downs	14	25
Plays–yards	51–259	75–385
Rushes–yards	35–130	35–175
Passing yards	129	210
Passing: Comp–Att–Int	11-16-1	22-40-0
Turnovers	1	0
Time of possession	26:15	33:45

Team	Category	Player	Statistics
Bowling Green	Passing	Hunter Najm	11/15, 129 yards, TD, INT
Bowling Green	Rushing	Austyn Dendy	21 carries, 113 yards, 2 TD
Bowling Green	Receiving	Jyrin Johnson	4 receptions, 36 yards, TD
Eastern Michigan	Passing	Noah Kim	22/39, 210 yards, TD
Eastern Michigan	Rushing	Dontae McMillan	19 carries, 100 yards, TD
Eastern Michigan	Receiving	Nick Devereaux	4 receptions, 79 yards, TD

=== at Ball State ===
Eastern Michigan Eagles (3–7) at Ball State Cardinals (4–5) – Game summary

Quarter	1	2	3	4	Total
Eagles	7	10	0	7	24
Cardinals	0	3	3	3	9

at Scheumann Stadium • Muncie, Indiana

- Date: November 15
- Game time: 12:00 p.m. EDT
- Game attendance: 8,430
- Referee: Billy Williams
- TV announcers (ESPN+): Michael Reghi (play-by-play) and Je'Rod Cherry (analyst)

Game information

First quarter

- EMU – Noah Kim 1-yard run (Rudy Kessinger kick), 9:19. Eagles 7–0. Drive: 9 plays, 58 yards, 4:13.

Second quarter

- BALL – DC Pippin 42-yard field goal, 12:16. Eagles 7–3. Drive: 7 plays, 30 yards, 2:56.
- EMU – Jamarien Wheeler 43-yard pass from Noah Kim (Rudy Kessinger kick), 7:49. Eagles 14–3. Drive: 4 plays, 55 yards, 1:30.
- EMU – Rudy Kessinger 43-yard field goal, 0:22. Eagles 17–3. Drive: 9 plays, 42 yards, 1:10.

Third quarter

- BALL – DC Pippin 25-yard field goal, 10:04. Eagles 17–6. Drive: 9 plays, 40 yards, 4:06.

Fourth quarter

- EMU – Tavierre Dunlap 36-yard run (Rudy Kessinger kick), 11:49. Eagles 24–6. Drive: 7 plays, 81 yards, 3:07.
- BALL – DC Pippin 38-yard field goal, 9:13. Eagles 24–9. Drive: 6 plays, 14 yards, 2:26.

Statistics	EMU	BALL
First downs	21	13
Plays–yards	69–380	60–225
Rushes–yards	40–151	38–163
Passing yards	229	62
Passing: Comp–Att–Int	18–29–2	13–22–1
Turnovers	2	1
Time of possession	31:09	28:51

Team	Category	Player	Statistics
Eastern Michigan	Passing	Noah Kim	18/29, 229 yards, TD, 2 INT
Eastern Michigan	Rushing	Dontae McMillan	21 carries, 80 yards
Eastern Michigan	Receiving	Jamarien Wheeler	6 receptions, 131 yards, TD
Ball State	Passing	Kiael Kelly	13/22, 62 yards, INT
Ball State	Rushing	Kiael Kelly	15 carries, 67 yards
Ball State	Receiving	Qian Magwood	1 reception, 19 yards

=== Western Michigan (Michigan MAC Trophy) ===
Western Michigan Broncos (7–4) at Eastern Michigan Eagles (4–7) – Game summary

Quarter	1	2	3	4	Total
Broncos	0	17	14	0	31
Eagles	7	0	0	14	21

at Rynearson Stadium • Ypsilanti, Michigan

- Date: November 25
- Game time: 7:30 p.m. EST
- Game weather: Overcast • Temperature: 50 °F (10 °C) • Wind: SW at 7 miles per hour (11 km/h)
- Game attendance: 11,818
- Referee: Rich Edwards
- TV announcers (ESPN2): Courtney Lyle (play-by-play) and Rene Ingoglia (analyst)

Game information

First quarter

- (6:35) EMU – Dontae McMillan 21-yard pass from Noah Kim, Rudy Kessinger kick (Drive: 9 plays, 98 yards, 4:50; Eastern Michigan 7–0)

Second quarter

- (7:30) WMU – Talique Williams 36-yard run, Palmer Domschke kick (Drive: 12 plays, 95 yards, 7:35; Tied 7–7)
- (1:31) WMU – Broc Lowry 33-yard run, Palmer Domschke kick (Drive: 5 plays, 75 yards, 2:06; Western Michigan 14–7)
- (0:02) WMU – Palmer Domschke 44-yard field goal (Drive: 9 plays, 52 yards, 1:08; Western Michigan 17–7)

Third quarter

- (7:31) WMU – Broc Lowry 1-yard run, Palmer Domschke kick (Drive: 5 plays, 23 yards, 2:52; Western Michigan 24–7)
- (2:31) WMU – Jalen Buckley 4-yard run, Palmer Domschke kick (Drive: 8 plays, 49 yards, 3:26; Western Michigan 31–7)

Fourth quarter

- (12:14) EMU – Nick Devereaux 1-yard pass from Noah Kim, two-point pass conversion failed (Drive: 11 plays, 92 yards, 5:10; Western Michigan 31–13)
- (2:28) EMU – Dontae McMillan 21-yard run, Noah Kim Pass to Joshua Long for two-point conversion (Drive: 9 plays, 98 yards, 4:50; Western Michigan 31–21)

Statistics	WMU	EMU
First downs	13	21
Plays–yards	64–378	64–461
Rushes–yards	49–278	23–134
Passing yards	100	327
Passing: Comp–Att–Int	7–15–0	24–41–3
Turnovers	0	5
Time of possession	32:21	27:39

Team	Category	Player	Statistics
Western Michigan	Passing	Broc Lowry	7/14, 100 yards
Western Michigan	Rushing	Broc Lowry	18 carries, 92 yards, 2 TD
Western Michigan	Receiving	Blake Bosma	3 receptions, 38 yards
Eastern Michigan	Passing	Noah Kim	24/41, 327 yards, 2 TD, 3 INT
Eastern Michigan	Rushing	Dontae McMillan	11 carries, 111 yards, TD
Eastern Michigan	Receiving	Dontae McMillan	4 receptions, 126 yards, TD
