= 2025 MAC Football Championship Game =

- Conference championship
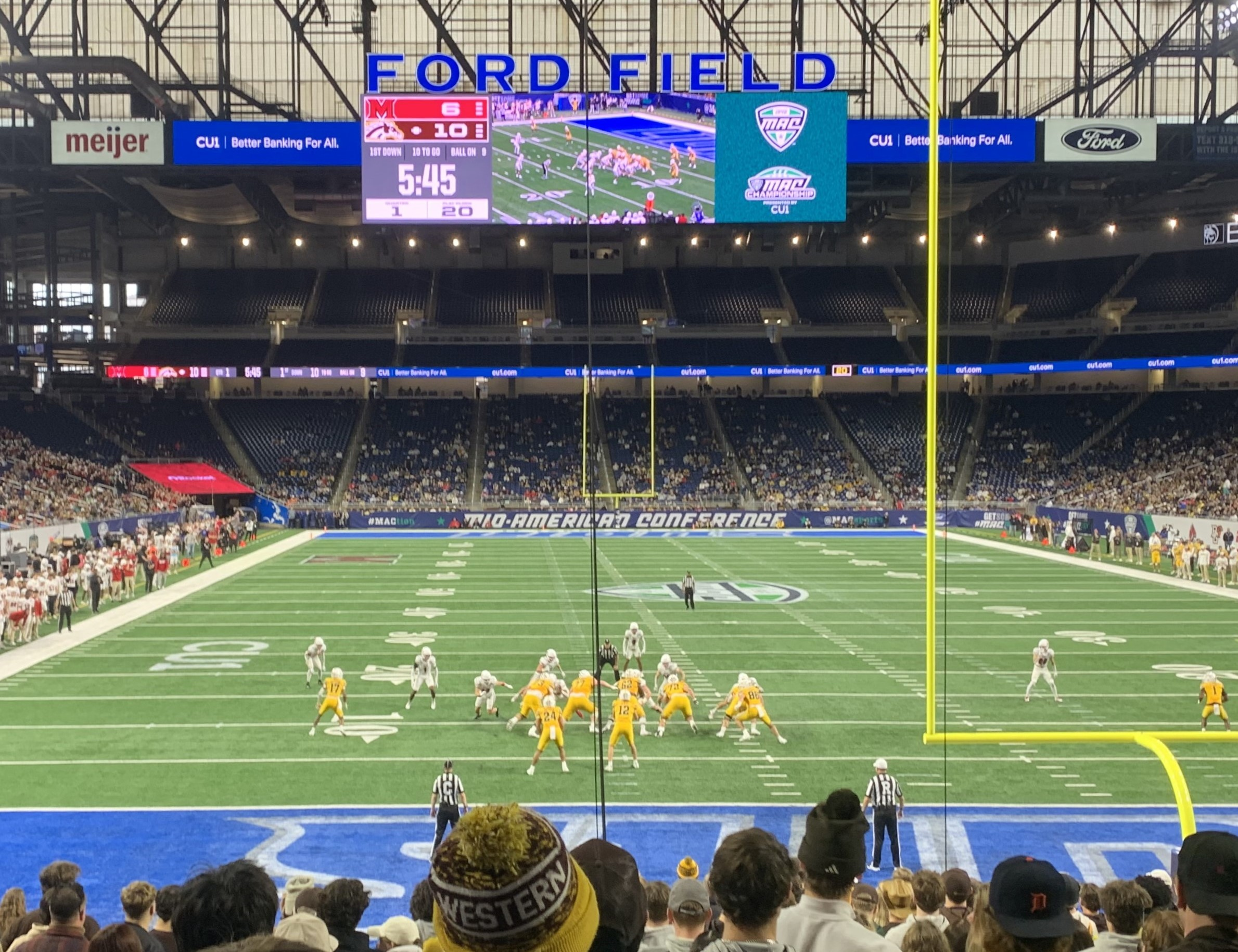
Miami RedHawks	Western Michigan Broncos
(7–5)	(8–4)
13	23
Head coach: Chuck Martin	Head coach: Lance Taylor
	1	2	3	4	Total
Miami	6	0	0	7	13
Western Michigan	10	6	7	0	23
- Date: December 6, 2025
- Season: 2025
- Stadium: Ford Field
- Location: Detroit, Michigan
- Favorite: Western Michigan by 2.5
- Attendance: 19,114

United States TV coverage
- Network: ESPN
- Announcers: Roy Philpott (play-by-play), Sam Acho (analyst), and Taylor Davis (sideline reporter)

2025 Mid-American Conference football standings
	Conf.			Overall
Team	W		L	W		L
Western Michigan y$	7	–	1	10	–	4
Miami (OH) y	6	–	2	7	–	7
Ohio	6	–	2	9	–	4
Toledo	6	–	2	8	–	5
Central Michigan	5	–	3	7	–	6
Akron*	4	–	4	5	–	7
Buffalo	4	–	4	5	–	7
Kent State	4	–	4	5	–	7
Eastern Michigan	3	–	5	4	–	8
Ball State	3	–	5	4	–	8
Bowling Green	2	–	6	4	–	8
Northern Illinois	2	–	6	3	–	9
UMass	0	–	8	0	–	12
Championship: Western Michigan 23, Miami (OH) 13
$ – Conference champion; y – Championship game participant; * Ineligible for postseason play due to low APR score

The 2025 MAC Football Championship Game was a college football conference championship game that was played on December 6, 2025, at Ford Field in Detroit, Michigan. It was the 29th edition of the MAC Football Championship Game and determined the champion of the Mid-American Conference (MAC) for the 2025 season. The game began at 12:00 noon EST and aired on ESPN. Western Michigan avenged their only regular season conference loss with a 23–13 victory over Miami to win the MAC Championship.

For the second year, the participants were not determined by division winners. Following the 2023 season the MAC eliminated divisions and the game now features the teams with the best conference records. A new tiebreaker system was established to compare teams with the same conference record.

== Venue ==
The 2025 MAC title game was held at Ford Field for the 22nd consecutive season. The venue, located in downtown Detroit at 2000 Brush St., is the home of the Detroit Lions of the National Football League (NFL) and has a seating capacity for football of 65,000.

== Teams ==
The game featured the teams with the best conference records without regard to divisions.

=== Western Michigan ===
Western Michigan finished its season with a win on the road against Eastern Michigan on November 25. With a 7–1 conference record, it finished the regular season in sole possession of first place in the MAC standings and earned one spot in the championship game.

=== Miami (OH) ===
Miami's victory over Ball State moved the RedHawks into a three-way tie for second place with Ohio and Toledo at 6–2 in the conference. Miami won the tiebreaker to advance to the championship game in spite of losing to both teams during the regular season.

== Game summary ==
2025 MAC Championship Game
Miami RedHawks (7–5, 6–2) vs Western Michigan Broncos (8–4, 7–1)

Quarter	1	2	3	4	Total
RedHawks	6	0	0	7	13
Broncos	10	6	7	0	23

at Ford Field, Detroit, Michigan

- Date: Saturday December 6, 2025
- Game time: 12:00 p.m.
- Game weather: Indoor
- Game attendance: 19,114
- TV announcers (ESPN): Roy Philpott (play-by-play), Sam Acho (analyst), and Taylor Davis (sideline reporter)

Game information

First quarter

- (13:33) WMU – Jalen Buckley 67 Yd Run (Palmer Domschke Kick), (3 plays, 75 yards, 1:27; WMU 7–0)
- (11:40) M-OH – Jordan Brunson 1 Yd Run (Dom Dzioban PAT failed), (5 plays, 75 yards, 1:53; WMU 7–6)
- (6:51) WMU – Palmer Domschke 27 Yd Field Goal, (10 plays, 66 yards, 4:49; WMU 10–6)

Second quarter

- (13:43) WMU – Palmer Domschke 31 Yd Field Goal, (12 plays, 78 yards, 7:02; WMU 13–6)
- (0:50) WMU – Palmer Domschke 50 Yd Field Goal, (7 plays, 33 yards, 0:57; WMU 16–6)

Third quarter

- (13:16) WMU – Jalen Buckley 64 Yd Run (Palmer Domschke Kick), (2 plays, 65 yards, 0:43; WMU 23–6)

Fourth quarter

- (6:14) M-OH – Cole Weaver 6 Yd pass from Henry Hesson (Dom Dzioban Kick), (8 plays, 80 yards, 2:42; WMU 23–13)

Statistics	M-OH	WMU
First downs	18	18
Plays–yards	69-272	69-397
Rushes–yards	31-73	56-286
Passing yards	199	111
Passing: comp–att–int	14-38-0	8-13-0
Turnovers		
Time of possession	24:43	35:17

Team	Category	Player	Statistics
Miami (OH)	Passing	Henry Hesson	7/20, 107 yards, 1 TD
Miami (OH)	Rushing	Jordan Brunson	14 carries, 59 yards, 1 TD
Miami (OH)	Receiving	Kam Perry	7 receptions, 101 yards
Western Michigan	Passing	Broc Lowry	8/13, 111 yards
Western Michigan	Rushing	Jalen Buckley	19 carries, 193 yards, 2 TD
Western Michigan	Receiving	Michael Brescia	2 receptions, 47 yards
