= 2025 Miami RedHawks football team =

American college football season

2025 Miami RedHawks football

MAC Championship, L 13–23 vs. Western Michigan

Arizona Bowl, L 3–18 vs. Fresno State
- Conference: Mid-American Conference
- Record: 7–7 (6–2 MAC)
- Head coach: Chuck Martin (12th season)
- Offensive coordinator: Pat Welsh (3rd season)
- Offensive scheme: Multiple
- Defensive coordinator: Bill Brechin (4th season)
- Base defense: Multiple
- Home stadium: Yager Stadium

2025 Mid-American Conference football standings
| | Conf. | | | Overall |
| Team | W | | L | W | | L |
|---|---|---|---|---|---|---|
| Western Michigan y$ | 7 | – | 1 | 10 | – | 4 |
| Miami (OH) y | 6 | – | 2 | 7 | – | 7 |
| Ohio | 6 | – | 2 | 9 | – | 4 |
| Toledo | 6 | – | 2 | 8 | – | 5 |
| Central Michigan | 5 | – | 3 | 7 | – | 6 |
| Akron* | 4 | – | 4 | 5 | – | 7 |
| Buffalo | 4 | – | 4 | 5 | – | 7 |
| Kent State | 4 | – | 4 | 5 | – | 7 |
| Eastern Michigan | 3 | – | 5 | 4 | – | 8 |
| Ball State | 3 | – | 5 | 4 | – | 8 |
| Bowling Green | 2 | – | 6 | 4 | – | 8 |
| Northern Illinois | 2 | – | 6 | 3 | – | 9 |
| UMass | 0 | – | 8 | 0 | – | 12 |
Championship: Western Michigan 23, Miami (OH) 13
$ – Conference champion; y – Championship game participant; * Ineligible for postseason play due to low APR score

The 2025 Miami RedHawks football team represented Miami University in the Mid-American Conference (MAC) during the 2025 NCAA Division I FBS football season. The RedHawks were led by Chuck Martin in his twelfth year as the head coach. The RedHawks played their home games at Yager Stadium, located in Oxford, Ohio.

== Preseason ==
The MAC Football Kickoff was held on Thursday, July 24, 2025, at the Ford Field in Detroit, Michigan from 9:00 am EDT to 1:30 pm EDT.

=== Preseason polls ===
==== Coaches Poll ====
On July 24 the MAC announced the preseason coaches' poll.

MAC Coaches poll
| Predicted finish | Team | Votes (1st place) |
| 1 | Toledo | 135 (7) |
| 2 | Miami | 131 (3) |
| 3 | Ohio | 123 (3) |
| 4 | Buffalo | 115 |
| 5 | Northern Illinois | 94 |
| 6 | Bowling Green | 81 |
| 7 | Western Michigan | 71 |
| 8 | Eastern Michigan | 68 |
| 9 | Central Michigan | 65 |
| 10 | Ball State | 41 |
| T11 | Akron | 39 |
| T11 | Massachusetts | 39 |
| 13 | Kent State | 12 |

Coaches poll (MAC Championship)
| Predicted finish | Team | Votes |
| 1 | Toledo | 6 |
| 2 | Miami | 4 |
| 3 | Ohio | 3 |

== Schedule ==
| Date | Time | Opponent | Site | TV | Result | Attendance |
|---|---|---|---|---|---|---|
| August 28 | 9:00 p.m. | at Wisconsin* | Camp Randall Stadium; Madison, WI | BTN | L 0–17 | 65,952 |
| September 6 | 3:30 p.m. | at Rutgers* | SHI Stadium; Piscataway, NJ | Peacock | L 17–45 | 45,981 |
| September 20 | 12:00 p.m. | UNLV* | Yager Stadium; Oxford, OH | ESPNU | L 38–41 | 12,625 |
| September 27 | 3:30 p.m. | Lindenwood*^{†} | Yager Stadium; Oxford, OH | ESPN+ | W 38–0 | 10,504 |
| October 4 | 3:30 p.m. | at Northern Illinois | Huskie Stadium; DeKalb, IL | ESPN+ | W 25–14 | 13,827 |
| October 11 | 12:00 p.m. | at Akron | InfoCision Stadium–Summa Field; Akron, OH | ESPN+ | W 20–7 | 6,575 |
| October 18 | 12:00 p.m. | Eastern Michigan | Yager Stadium; Oxford, OH | ESPN+ | W 44–30 | 6,832 |
| October 25 | 3:30 p.m. | Western Michigan | Yager Stadium; Oxford, OH | ESPN+ | W 26–17 | 18,025 |
| November 4 | 7:00 p.m. | at Ohio | Peden Stadium; Athens, OH (Battle of the Bricks) | ESPN2 | L 20–24 | 22,231 |
| November 12 | 7:00 p.m. | Toledo | Yager Stadium; Oxford, OH | ESPN2 | L 3–24 | 10,825 |
| November 19 | 7:00 p.m. | at Buffalo | University at Buffalo Stadium; Amherst, NY | ESPN2 | W 37–20 | 15,246 |
| November 29 | 12:00 p.m. | Ball State | Yager Stadium; Oxford, OH | CBSSN | W 45–24 | 11,137 |
| December 6 | 12:00 p.m. | vs. Western Michigan | Ford Field; Detroit, MI (MAC Championship Game) | ESPN | L 13–23 | 19,114 |
| December 27 | 4:30 p.m. | vs. Fresno State* | Casino Del Sol Stadium; Tucson, AZ (Arizona Bowl) | The CW | L 3–18 | 37,232 |
*Non-conference game; ^{†}Homecoming; All times are in Eastern time

== Game summaries ==
=== at Wisconsin ===
Miami RedHawks (0–0) at Wisconsin Badgers (0–0) – Game summary

| Quarter | 1 | 2 | 3 | 4 | Total |
|---|---|---|---|---|---|
| RedHawks | 0 | 0 | 0 | 0 | 0 |
| Badgers | 3 | 0 | 7 | 7 | 17 |

at Camp Randall Stadium • Madison, WI

- Date: August 28
- Game time: 9:00 p.m. EDT
- Game weather: Clear, 67 °F (19 °C); Wind: E 6 mph
- Game attendance: 65,952
- Referee: Bryan Banks
- TV announcers (BTN): Lisa Byington (play-by-play), Anthony Herron (analyst), and Melanie Ricks (sideline)

Game information

First quarter

- WIS – Nathanial Vakos 42-yard field goal, 1:39. Wisconsin 3–0. Drive: 15 plays, 69 yards, 7:16.

Second quarter

- No scoring plays.

Third quarter

- WIS – Vinny Anthony II 3-yard pass from Danny O'Neil (Nathanial Vakos kick), 4:08 Wisconsin 10–0 Drive: 7 plays, 54 yards, 2:46.

Fourth quarter

- WIS – Danny O'Neil 1-yard run (Nathanial Vakos kick), 6:45 Wisconsin 17–0 Drive: 3 plays, 2 yards, 1:22.

| Statistics | M-OH | WIS |
|---|---|---|
| First downs | 7 | 23 |
| Plays–yards | 40–117 | 75–353 |
| Rushes–yards | 22–34 | 43–165 |
| Passing yards | 83 | 188 |
| Passing: comp–att–int | 9–18–2 | 18–32–1 |
| Turnovers | 2 | 1 |
| Time of possession | 20:47 | 39:13 |

| Team | Category | Player | Statistics |
|---|---|---|---|
| Miami (OH) | Passing | Dequan Finn | 9/18, 83 yards, 2 INT |
| Miami (OH) | Rushing | Kenny Tracy | 6 carries, 15 yards |
| Miami (OH) | Receiving | Cole Weaver | 3 receptions, 35 yards |
| Miami (OH) | Defense | Silas Walters | 8 tackles, INT, 2 pass breakups |
| Wisconsin | Passing | Danny O'Neil | 12/19, 120 yards, TD, INT |
| Wisconsin | Rushing | Dilin Jones | 14 carries, 74 yards |
| Wisconsin | Receiving | Vinny Anthony II | 4 receptions, 57 yards, TD |
| Wisconsin | Defense | Preston Zachman | 2 tackles, 2 INT |

=== at Rutgers ===
Miami RedHawks (0–1) at Rutgers Scarlet Knights (1–0) – Game summary

| Quarter | 1 | 2 | 3 | 4 | Total |
|---|---|---|---|---|---|
| RedHawks | 7 | 3 | 7 | 0 | 17 |
| Scarlet Knights | 7 | 17 | 7 | 14 | 45 |

at SHI Stadium • Piscataway, NJ

- Date: September 6
- Game time: 4:30 p.m. EDT
- Game weather:
- Game attendance: 45,981
- Referee: Billy Williams
- TV announcers (Peacock): Paul Burmeister (play-by-play), Phil Simms (analyst) and Zora Stephenson (sideline)

Game information

First quarter

- RUTG – Ian Strong 14-yard pass from Athan Kaliakmanis (Jai Patel kick), 7:25. Scarlet Knights 7–0. Drive: 11 plays, 75 yards, 6:09.
- MOH – D'Shawntae Jones 1-yard run (Dom Dzioban kick), 5:11. Tied 7–7. Drive: 4 plays, 75 yards, 2:14.

Second quarter

- RUTG – Jai Patel 39-yard field goal, 12:34. Scarlet Knights 10–7. Drive: 16 plays, 54 yards, 7:37.
- RUTG – Antwan Raymond 2-yard run (Jai Patel kick), 8:18. Scarlet Knights 17–7. Drive: 3 plays, 12 yards, 0:59.
- RUTG – KJ Duff 11-yard pass from Athan Kaliakmanis (Jai Patel kick), 1:20. Scarlet Knights 24–7. Drive: 10 plays, 70 yards, 4:25.
- MOH – Dom Dzioban 40-yard field goal, 0:02. Scarlet Knights 24–10. Drive: 8 plays, 53 yards, 1:18.

Third quarter

- MOH – Dequan Finn 5-yard run (Dom Dzioban kick), 10:21. Scarlet Knights 24–17. Drive: 3 plays, 84 yards, 1:36.
- RUTG – Ian Strong 17-yard pass from Athan Kaliakmanis (Jai Patel kick), 6:08. Scarlet Knights 31–17. Drive: 9 plays, 65 yards, 4:06.

Fourth quarter

- RUTG – DT Sheffield 5-yard pass from Athan Kaliakmanis (Jai Patel kick), 5:42. Scarlet Knights 38–17. Drive: 10 plays, 78 yards, 6:29.
- RUTG – Antwan Raymond 4-yard run (Jai Patel kick), 1:53. Scarlet Knights 45–17. Drive: 4 plays, 48 yards, 1:49.

| Statistics | M-OH | RUTG |
|---|---|---|
| First downs | 14 | 31 |
| Plays–yards | 45–368 | 77–421 |
| Rushes–yards | 22–117 | 41–162 |
| Passing yards | 251 | 259 |
| Passing: comp–att–int | 14–23–1 | 26–36–0 |
| Turnovers | 1 | 0 |
| Time of possession | 20:54 | 39:06 |

| Team | Category | Player | Statistics |
|---|---|---|---|
| Miami (OH) | Passing | Dequan Finn | 14/23, 251 yards, INT |
| Miami (OH) | Rushing | Dequan Finn | 11 carries, 85 yards, TD |
| Miami (OH) | Receiving | Keith Reynolds | 7 receptions, 120 yards |
| Rutgers | Passing | Athan Kaliakmanis | 26/36, 259 yards, 4 TD |
| Rutgers | Rushing | Antwan Raymond | 13 carries, 82 yards, 2 TD |
| Rutgers | Receiving | Ian Strong | 9 receptions, 116 yards, 2 TD |

=== UNLV ===
UNLV Rebels (3–0) at Miami RedHawks (0–2) – Game summary

| Quarter | 1 | 2 | 3 | 4 | Total |
|---|---|---|---|---|---|
| Rebels | 0 | 10 | 14 | 17 | 41 |
| RedHawks | 14 | 10 | 14 | 0 | 38 |

at Yager Stadium • Oxford, OH

- Date: September 20
- Game time: 12:00 p.m. EDT
- Game weather: Cloudy • Temperature: 80 °F (27 °C) • Wind: SE at 3 miles per hour (4.8 km/h)
- Game attendance: 12,625
- Referee: Andrew Speciale
- TV announcers (ESPNU): Matt Schumacker (play-by-play) and Dustin Fox (analyst)

Game information

First quarter

- (10:15) MIA – Kenny Tracy 29-yard pass from Dequan Finn, Dom Dzioban kick (Drive: 1 play, 29 yards, 0:08; Miami (OH) 7–0)
- (3:25) MIA – Keith Reynolds 3-yard pass from Dequan Finn, Dom Dzioban kick (Drive: 7 plays, 91 yards, 4:01; Miami (OH) 14–0)

Second quarter

- (14:18) UNLV – Ramon Villela 27-yard field goal (Drive: 11 plays, 69 yards, 3:37; Miami (OH) 14–3)
- (10:41) UNLV – Aamaris Brown 67-yard interception, Ramon Villela kick (Miami (OH) 14–10)
- (8:10) MIA – Kenny Tracy 22-yard pass from Henry Hesson, Dom Dzioban kick (Drive: 6 plays, 75 yards, 2:31; Miami (OH) 21–10)
- (0:24) MIA – Dom Dzioban 40-yard field goal (Drive: 10 plays, 50 yards, 1:21; Miami (OH) 24–10)

Third quarter

- (12:45) UNLV – Jai'Den Thomas 3-yard run, Ramon Villela kick (Drive: 5 plays, 65 yards, 2:15; Miami (OH) 24–17)
- (7:45) UNLV – Jaden Bradley 4-yard pass from Anthony Colandrea, Ramon Villela kick (Drive: 9 plays, 66 yards, 4:14; Tied 24–24)
- (7:33) MIA – Keith Reynolds 100-yard kickoff return, Dom Dzioban kick (Miami (OH) 31–24)
- (6:19) MIA – Corban Hondru 47-yard interception, Dom Dzioban kick (Miami (OH) 38–24)

Fourth quarter

- (13:13) UNLV – Taeshaun Lyon 9-yard pass from Anthony Colandrea, Ramon Villela kick (Drive: 17 plays, 87 yards, 8:00; Miami (OH) 38–31)
- (6:50) UNLV – Keyvone Lee 1-yard run, Ramon Villela kick (Drive: 7 plays, 49 yards, 4:02; Tied 38–38)
- (0:15) UNLV – Ramon Villela 23-yard field goal (Drive: 9 plays, 78 yards, 2:17; UNLV 41–38)

| Statistics | UNLV | M-OH |
|---|---|---|
| First downs | 30 | 19 |
| Plays–yards | 86–515 | 53–396 |
| Rushes–yards | 43–222 | 22–131 |
| Passing yards | 293 | 265 |
| Passing: Comp–Att–Int | 29–43–2 | 15–31–2 |
| Turnovers | 2 | 3 |
| Time of possession | 37:43 | 21:52 |

| Team | Category | Player | Statistics |
|---|---|---|---|
| UNLV | Passing | Anthony Colandrea | 29/43, 293 yards, 2 TD, 2 INT |
| UNLV | Rushing | Jai'Den Thomas | 13 carries, 118 yards, TD |
| UNLV | Receiving | Jaden Bradley | 7 receptions, 93 yards, TD |
| Miami (OH) | Passing | Henry Hesson | 8/17, 134 yards, TD |
| Miami (OH) | Rushing | Kenny Tracy | 16 carries, 104 yards |
| Miami (OH) | Receiving | Kam Perry | 5 receptions, 122 yards |

=== Lindenwood (FCS) ===
Lindenwood Lions (FCS) (2–2) at Miami RedHawks (0–3) – Game summary

| Quarter | 1 | 2 | 3 | 4 | Total |
|---|---|---|---|---|---|
| Lions (FCS) | 0 | 0 | 0 | 0 | 0 |
| RedHawks | 7 | 10 | 14 | 7 | 38 |

at Yager Stadium • Oxford, OH

- Date: September 27
- Game time: 3:30 PM EDT
- Game weather: Sunny • Temperature: 81 °F (27 °C) • Wind: NW at 4 miles per hour (6.4 km/h)
- Game attendance: 10,504
- Referee: Rich Edwards
- TV announcers (ESPN+): Shawn Kenney (play-by-play) and Doc Holliday (analyst)

Game information

First quarter

- (8:21) M-OH – Jermaine Agee 8-yard punt return, Dom Dzioban kick (Miami (OH) 7–0)

Second quarter

- (10:32) M-OH – Dom Dzioban 33-yard field goal (Drive: 10 plays, 72 yards, 4:37; Miami (OH) 10–0)
- (7:32) M-OH – Kam Perry 31-yard pass from Henry Hesson, Dom Dzioban kick (Drive: 3 plays, 59 yards, 1:24; Miami (OH) 17–0)

Third quarter

- (7:49) M-OH – Kenny Tracy 20-yard run, Dom Dzioban kick (Drive: 10 plays, 80 yards, 5:11; Miami (OH) 24–0)
- (0:27) M-OH – Kam Perry 66-yard pass from Henry Hesson, Dom Dzioban kick (Drive: 3 plays, 71 yards, 1:34; Miami (OH) 31–0)

Fourth quarter

- (4:23) M-OH – Jordan Brunson 1-yard run, Dom Dzioban kick (Drive: 13 plays, 53 yards, 8:45; Miami (OH) 38–0)

| Statistics | LIN | M-OH |
|---|---|---|
| First downs | 9 | 23 |
| Plays–yards | 54–146 | 72–472 |
| Rushes–yards | 29–59 | 49–264 |
| Passing yards | 87 | 208 |
| Passing: Comp–Att–Int | 9–25–2 | 13–23–0 |
| Turnovers | 2 | 0 |
| Time of possession | 23:07 | 36:53 |

| Team | Category | Player | Statistics |
|---|---|---|---|
| Lindenwood | Passing | Nate Glantz | 9/25, 87 yards, 2 INT |
| Lindenwood | Rushing | Jared Rhodes | 7 carries, 28 yards |
| Lindenwood | Receiving | Drew Krobath | 2 receptions, 44 yards |
| Miami (OH) | Passing | Henry Hesson | 13/21, 208 yards, 2 TD |
| Miami (OH) | Rushing | Kenny Tracy | 20 carries, 134 yards, TD |
| Miami (OH) | Receiving | Kam Perry | 3 receptions, 122 yards, 2 TD |

=== at Northern Illinois ===
Miami RedHawks (1–3) at Northern Illinois Huskies (1–3) – Game summary

| Quarter | 1 | 2 | 3 | 4 | Total |
|---|---|---|---|---|---|
| RedHawks | 0 | 10 | 12 | 3 | 25 |
| Huskies | 14 | 0 | 0 | 0 | 14 |

at Huskie Stadium • DeKalb, IL

- Date: October 4
- Game time: 3:30 p.m. EDT
- Game weather: Sunny • Temperature: 85 °F (29 °C) • Wind: NE at 10 miles per hour (16 km/h)
- Game attendance: 13,827
- Referee: Rick Warne
- TV announcers (ESPN+): Jason Ross Jr. (play-by-play) and Tyoka Jackson (analyst)

Game information

First quarter

- (10:18) NIU – Lazaro Rogers 76-yard run, Andrew Glass kick (Drive: 1 play, 76 yards, 0:10; Northern Illinois 7–0)
- (3:23) NIU – Jake Appleget 17-yard pass from Brady Davidson, Andrew Glass kick (Drive: 11 plays, 60 yards, 5:22; Northern Illinois 14–0)

Second quarter

- (14:57) M–OH – D'Shawntae Jones 1-yard run, Dom Dzioban kick (Drive: 7 plays, 75 yards, 3:26; Northern Illinois 14–7)
- (4:51) M–OH – Dom Dzioban 41-yard field goal (Drive: 13 plays, 50 yards, 6:31; Northern Illinois 14–10)

Third quarter

- (13:30) M–OH – Dom Dzioban 45-yard field goal (Drive: 4 plays, 0 yards, 1:25; Northern Illinois 14–13)
- (11:30) M–OH – 0-yard safety (Miami (OH) 15–14)
- (8:11) M–OH – Deion Colzie 8-yard pass from Dequan Finn, Dom Dzioban kick (Drive: 5 plays, 50 yards, 3:19; Miami (OH) 22–14)

Fourth quarter

- (3:31) M–OH – Dom Dzioban 24-yard field goal (Drive: 13 plays, 68 yards, 6:33; Miami (OH) 25–14)

| Statistics | M-OH | NIU |
|---|---|---|
| First downs | 22 | 11 |
| Plays–yards | 76–367 | 51–220 |
| Rushes–yards | 50–197 | 23–114 |
| Passing yards | 170 | 106 |
| Passing: Comp–Att–Int | 14–26–0 | 13–28–1 |
| Turnovers | 0 | 2 |
| Time of possession | 39:06 | 20:54 |

| Team | Category | Player | Statistics |
|---|---|---|---|
| Miami (OH) | Passing | Dequan Finn | 14/26, 170 yards, TD |
| Miami (OH) | Rushing | Dequan Finn | 21 carries, 90 yards |
| Miami (OH) | Receiving | Kam Perry | 3 receptions, 76 yards |
| Northern Illinois | Passing | Brady Davidson | 13/28, 106 yards, TD, INT |
| Northern Illinois | Rushing | Lazaro Rogers | 9 carries, 98 yards, TD |
| Northern Illinois | Receiving | Dearee Rogers | 4 receptions, 40 yards |

=== at Akron ===
Miami RedHawks (2–3) at Akron Zips (2–4) – Game summary

| Quarter | 1 | 2 | 3 | 4 | Total |
|---|---|---|---|---|---|
| RedHawks | 0 | 3 | 14 | 3 | 20 |
| Zips | 0 | 0 | 0 | 7 | 7 |

at InfoCision Stadium–Summa Field • Akron, OH

- Date: October 11
- Game time: 12:00 p.m. EDT
- Game weather: Sunny
- Game attendance: 6,575
- Referee: Chris La Mange
- TV announcers (ESPN+): Michael Reghi (play-by-play) and Ryan Cavanaugh (analyst)

Game information

First quarter

- No scoring plays.

Second quarter

- (1:33) M-OH – Dom Dzioban 41-yard field goal (Drive: 7 plays, 47 yards, 1:52; Miami (OH) 3–0)

Third quarter

- (10:32) M-OH – D'Shawntae Jones 1-yard run, Dom Dzioban kick (Drive: 9 plays, 75 yards, 4:28; Miami (OH) 10–0)
- (7:52) M-OH – Kam Perry 60-yard pass from Dequan Finn, Dom Dzioban kick (Drive: 2 plays, 64 yards, 0:52; Miami (OH) 17–0)

Fourth quarter

- (11:35) M-OH – Dom Dzioban 46-yard field goal (Drive: 4 plays, 2 yards, 1:40; Miami (OH) 20–0)
- (6:54) AKR – Israel Polk 5-yard pass from Ben Finley, Matthew Schramm kick (Drive: 11 plays, 75 yards, 4:41; Miami (OH) 20–7)

| Statistics | M-OH | AKR |
|---|---|---|
| First downs | 20 | 17 |
| Plays–yards | 67–350 | 64–273 |
| Rushes–yards | 41–147 | 25–62 |
| Passing yards | 203 | 211 |
| Passing: Comp–Att–Int | 14–26–1 | 21–39–1 |
| Turnovers | 1 | 1 |
| Time of possession | 34:12 | 25:48 |

| Team | Category | Player | Statistics |
|---|---|---|---|
| Miami (OH) | Passing | Dequan Finn | 14/25, 203 yards, TD, INT |
| Miami (OH) | Rushing | Jordan Brunson | 19 carries, 72 yards |
| Miami (OH) | Receiving | Kam Perry | 2 receptions, 77 yards, TD |
| Akron | Passing | Ben Finley | 21/39, 211 yards, TD, INT |
| Akron | Rushing | Jordan Gant | 14 carries, 35 yards |
| Akron | Receiving | Kyan Mason | 5 receptions, 52 yards |

=== Eastern Michigan ===
Eastern Michigan Eagles (2–5) at Miami RedHawks (3–3) – Game summary

| Quarter | 1 | 2 | 3 | 4 | Total |
|---|---|---|---|---|---|
| Eagles | 0 | 14 | 0 | 16 | 30 |
| RedHawks | 7 | 14 | 7 | 16 | 44 |

at Yager Stadium • Oxford, OH

- Date: October 18
- Game time: 12:00 p.m. EDT
- Game weather: Sunny • Temperature: 71 °F (22 °C) • Wind: N at 7 miles per hour (11 km/h)
- Game attendance: 6,832
- Referee: Billy Williams
- TV announcers (ESPN+): Eric Rothman (play-by-play) and Marcus Ray (analyst)

Game information

First quarter

- (5:25) M-OH – Jordan Brunson 1-yard run, Dom Dzioban kick (Drive: 11 plays, 69 yards, 6:17; Miami (OH) 7–0)

Second quarter

- (7:41) M-OH – Josh Ringer 3-yard pass from Dequan Finn, Dom Dzioban kick (Drive: 20 plays, 66 yards, 11:20; Miami (OH) 14–0)
- (6:46) EMU – Harold Mack 51-yard pass from Noah Kim, Rudy Kessinger kick (Drive: 3 plays, 75 yards, 0:55; Miami (OH) 14–7)
- (4:17) M-OH – Brian Shane 20-yard pass from Dequan Finn, Dom Dzioban kick (Drive: 5 plays, 75 yards, 2:29; Miami (OH) 21–7)
- (0:26) EMU – Harold Mack 12-yard pass from Noah Kim, Rudy Kessinger kick (Drive: 8 plays, 84 yards, 1:23; Miami (OH) 21–14)

Third quarter

- (5:28) M-OH – Dequan Finn 1-yard run, Dom Dzioban kick (Drive: 6 plays, 62 yards, 3:09; Miami (OH) 28–14)

Fourth quarter

- (14:35) M-OH – Dequan Finn 4-yard run, Dom Dzioban kick (Drive: 9 plays, 55 yards, 4:21; Miami (OH) 35–14)
- (14:07) M-OH – Team safety (Miami (OH) 37–14)
- (9:07) EMU – Nick Devereaux 19-yard pass from Noah Kim, Noah Kim pass to Porter Rooks for two-point conversion (Drive: 6 plays, 74 yards, 2:08; Miami (OH) 37–22)
- (3:52) M-OH – D'Shawntae Jones 2-yard run, Dom Dzioban kick (Drive: 9 plays, 75 yards, 5:15; Miami (OH) 44–22)
- (0:58) EMU – Nick Devereaux 21-yard pass from Noah Kim, Noah Kim pass to Joshua Long for two-point conversion (Drive: 13 plays, 82 yards, 2:50; Miami (OH) 44–30)

| Statistics | EMU | M-OH |
|---|---|---|
| First downs | 17 | 23 |
| Plays–yards | 58–369 | 77–454 |
| Rushes–yards | 22–60 | 55–295 |
| Passing yards | 309 | 159 |
| Passing: Comp–Att–Int | 20-36-2 | 13-22-0 |
| Turnovers | 2 | 1 |
| Time of possession | 17:51 | 42:09 |

| Team | Category | Player | Statistics |
|---|---|---|---|
| Eastern Michigan | Passing | Noah Kim | 20/36, 309 yards, 4 TD, 2 INT |
| Eastern Michigan | Rushing | Dontae McMillan | 11 carries, 37 yards |
| Eastern Michigan | Receiving | Harold Mack | 6 receptions, 179 yards, 2 TD |
| Miami (OH) | Passing | Dequan Finn | 13/22, 159 yards, 2 TD |
| Miami (OH) | Rushing | Jordan Brunson | 23 carries, 122 yards, TD |
| Miami (OH) | Receiving | Brian Shane | 4 receptions, 56 yards, TD |

=== Western Michigan ===
Western Michigan Broncos (4–3) at Miami RedHawks (4–3) – Game summary

| Quarter | 1 | 2 | 3 | 4 | Total |
|---|---|---|---|---|---|
| Broncos | 0 | 14 | 3 | 0 | 17 |
| RedHawks | 3 | 6 | 0 | 17 | 26 |

at Yager Stadium • Oxford, OH

- Date: October 25
- Game time: 3:30 p.m. EDT
- Game weather: Cloudy • Temperature: 56 °F (13 °C) • Wind: E at 4 miles per hour (6.4 km/h)
- Game attendance: 18,025
- Referee: Marcel Kerr
- TV announcers (ESPN+): Michael Reghi (play-by-play) and Marcus Ray (analyst)

Game information

First quarter

- (11:28) M–OH – Dom Dzioban 44-yard field goal (Drive: 7 plays, 48 yards, 3:32; Miami (OH) 3–0)

Second quarter

- (14:54) M–OH – Dom Dzioban 24-yard field goal (Drive: 13 plays, 68 yards, 6:54; Miami (OH) 6–0)
- (5:17) WMU – Tailique Williams 43-yard pass from Broc Lowry, Palmer Domschke kick (Drive: 4 plays, 93 yards, 1:21; Western Michigan 7–6)
- (2:36) M–OH – Dom Dzioban 29-yard field goal (Drive: 7 plays, 63 yards, 2:41; Miami (OH) 9–7)
- (0:49) WMU – Michael Brescia 2-yard run, Palmer Domschke kick (Drive: 7 plays, 21 yards, 1:32; Western Michigan 14–9)

Third quarter

- (4:10) WMU – Palmer Domschke 42-yard field goal (Drive: 15 plays, 58 yards, 7:39; Western Michigan 17–9)

Fourth quarter

- (10:31) M–OH – Brian Shane 3-yard pass from Dequan Finn (Drive: 9 plays, 71 yards, 4:29; Western Michigan 17–15)
- (4:40) M–OH – Dequan Finn 18-yard run, Kam Perry pass (Drive: 6 plays, 88 yards, 2:27; Western Michigan 23–17)
- (1:56) M–OH – Dom Dzioban 51-yard field goal (Drive: 4 plays, 5 yards, 0:58; Miami (OH) 26–17)

| Statistics | WMU | M-OH |
|---|---|---|
| First downs | 17 | 19 |
| Plays–yards | 68–316 | 62–408 |
| Rushes–yards | 39–144 | 32–148 |
| Passing yards | 172 | 260 |
| Passing: Comp–Att–Int | 16–29–0 | 18–30–0 |
| Turnovers | 1 | 0 |
| Time of possession | 29:21 | 30:39 |

| Team | Category | Player | Statistics |
|---|---|---|---|
| Western Michigan | Passing | Broc Lowry | 16/28, 172 yards, TD |
| Western Michigan | Rushing | Broc Lowry | 20 carries, 82 yards |
| Western Michigan | Receiving | Tailique Williams | 5 receptions, 71 yards, TD |
| Miami (OH) | Passing | Dequan Finn | 18/30, 260 yards, TD |
| Miami (OH) | Rushing | Jordan Brunson | 13 carries, 90 yards |
| Miami (OH) | Receiving | Kam Perry | 4 receptions, 98 yards |

=== at Ohio (Battle of the Bricks) ===
Miami RedHawks (5–3) at Ohio Bobcats (5–3) – Game summary

| Quarter | 1 | 2 | 3 | 4 | Total |
|---|---|---|---|---|---|
| RedHawks | 0 | 3 | 3 | 14 | 20 |
| Bobcats | 0 | 3 | 7 | 14 | 24 |

at Peden Stadium • Athens, OH

- Date: November 4
- Game time: 7:00 PM EST
- Game weather: sunny, Temperature:46 °F (8 °C), Wind: N 0 mph
- Game attendance: 22,231
- Referee: Chris La Mange
- TV announcers (ESPN2): Clay Matvick (play-by-play) and Chase Daniel (analyst)

Game information

First quarter

- (01:57) M-OH – Dom Dzioban 23-yard field goal, 13 plays, 74 yards, 8:53; M-OH 3–0
- (00:07) OHIO – David Dellenbach 35-yard field goal, 10 plays, 47 yards, 1:50; Tied 3–3

Second quarter

- No scoring plays.

Third quarter

- (08:15) M-OH – Dom Dzioban 46-yard field goal, 4 plays, 7 yards, 2:07; M-OH 6–3
- (04:37) OHIO – Sieh Bangura 22-yard run (David Dellenbach kick), 8 plays, 75 yards, 3:38; OHIO 10–6

Fourth quarter

- (13:29) M-OH – Braylon Isom 4-yard pass from Dequan Finn (Dom Dzioban kick), 11 plays, 60 yards, 5:59; M-OH 13–10
- (13:15) OHIO – Sieh Bangura 97-yard kickoff return (David Dellenbach kick), OHIO 17–13
- (09:29) M-OH – Kam Perry 27-yard pass from Dequan Finn (Dom Dzioban kick), 7 plays, 75 yards, 3:04; M-OH 20–17
- (02:15) OHIO – Rodney Harris II 49-yard pass from Parker Navarro (David Dellenbach kick), 5 plays, 75 yards, 3:04; OHIO 24–20

| Statistics | M-OH | OHIO |
|---|---|---|
| First downs | 16 | 19 |
| Plays–yards | 56–303 | 62–308 |
| Rushes–yards | 31–109 | 31–137 |
| Passing yards | 194 | 201 |
| Passing: Comp–Att–Int | 17–25–1 | 16–31–1 |
| Turnovers | 1 | 2 |
| Time of possession | 32:50 | 27:10 |

| Team | Category | Player | Statistics |
|---|---|---|---|
| Miami (OH) | Passing | Dequan Finn | 17/25, 194 yards, 2 TD, INT |
| Miami (OH) | Rushing | Jordan Brunson | 15 carries, 49 yards |
| Miami (OH) | Receiving | Cole Weaver | 6 receptions, 94 yards |
| Ohio | Passing | Parker Navarro | 16/31, 201 yards, TD, INT |
| Ohio | Rushing | Sieh Bangura | 17 carries, 102 yards, TD |
| Ohio | Receiving | Rodney Harris | 5 receptions, 92 yards, TD |

=== Toledo ===
Toledo Rockets (5–4) at Miami RedHawks (5–4) – Game summary

| Quarter | 1 | 2 | 3 | 4 | Total |
|---|---|---|---|---|---|
| Rockets | 0 | 14 | 10 | 0 | 24 |
| RedHawks | 0 | 0 | 3 | 0 | 3 |

at Yager Stadium • Oxford, OH

- Date: November 12
- Game time: 7:00 p.m. EST
- Game weather: Sunny • Wind: E at 15 miles per hour (24 km/h)
- Game attendance: 10,825
- Referee: Andrew Speciale
- TV announcers (ESPN2): Jay Alter (play-by-play) and Rocky Boiman (analyst)

Game information

First quarter

- No scoring plays.

Second quarter

- (5:59) TOL – Chip Trayanum 3-yard run, Dylan Cunanan kick (Drive: 9 plays, 46 yards, 3:21; Toledo 7–0)
- (0:18) TOL – Jacob Petersen 6-yard pass from Tucker Gleason, Dylan Cunanan kick (Drive: 1 play, 6 yards, 0:00; Toledo 14–0)

Third quarter

- (11:31) TOL – Ryder Treadway 24-yard pass from Tucker Gleason, Dylan Cunanan kick (Drive: 7 plays, 79 yards, 3:17; Toledo 21–0)
- (8:31) TOL – Dylan Cunanan 36-yard field goal (Drive: 4 plays, 7 yards, 2:01; Toledo 24–0)
- (1:45) M-OH – Dom Dzioban 26-yard field goal (Drive: 14 plays, 61 yards, 6:40; Toledo 24–3)

Fourth quarter

- No scoring plays.

| Statistics | TOL | M-OH |
|---|---|---|
| First downs | 15 | 15 |
| Plays–yards | 63–312 | 70–222 |
| Rushes–yards | 32–143 | 32–75 |
| Passing yards | 169 | 147 |
| Passing: Comp–Att–Int | 18–31–2 | 11–38–3 |
| Turnovers | 3 | 3 |
| Time of possession | 30:09 | 29:51 |

| Team | Category | Player | Statistics |
|---|---|---|---|
| Toledo | Passing | Tucker Gleason | 18/31, 169 yards, 2 TD, 2 INT |
| Toledo | Rushing | Chip Trayanum | 21 carries, 91 yards, TD |
| Toledo | Receiving | Ryder Treadway | 4 receptions, 55 yards, TD |
| Miami (OH) | Passing | Henry Hesson | 11/38, 147 yards, 3 INT |
| Miami (OH) | Rushing | Jordan Brunson | 9 carries, 44 yards |
| Miami (OH) | Receiving | Kam Perry | 4 receptions, 69 yards |

=== at Buffalo ===
Miami RedHawks (5–5) vs. Buffalo Bulls (5–5) – Game summary

| Quarter | 1 | 2 | 3 | 4 | Total |
|---|---|---|---|---|---|
| RedHawks | 0 | 17 | 14 | 6 | 37 |
| Bulls | 3 | 7 | 10 | 0 | 20 |

at University at Buffalo Stadium • Amherst, NY

- Date: November 19
- Game time: 7:00 PM EST
- Game weather: Clear • Temperature: 35 °F (2 °C) • Wind: NNE at 5 miles per hour (8.0 km/h)
- Game attendance: 15,246
- Referee: Rich Edwards
- TV announcers (ESPN2): Matt Schumacker (play-by-play) and Dustin Fox (analyst)

Game information

First quarter

- (0:56) BUFF – Jack Howes 33-yard field goal (Drive: 13 plays, 77 yards, 6:49; Buffalo 3-0)

Second quarter

- (13:42) M-OH – Kam Perry 32-yard pass from Thomas Gotkowski, Dom Dzioban kick (Drive: 5 plays, 75 yards, 2:14; Miami (OH) 7-3)
- (3:16) M-OH – Thomas Gotkowski 3-yard run, Dom Dzioban kick (Drive: 7 plays, 62 yards, 3:14; Miami (OH) 14-3)
- (1:51) M-OH – Dom Dzioban 42-yard field goal (Drive: 4 plays, -3 yards, 1:20; Miami (OH) 17-3)
- (0:13) BUFF – Victor Snow 9-yard pass from Ta'Quan Roberson, Jack Howes kick (Drive: 10 plays, 75 yards, 1:38; Miami (OH) 17-10)

Third quarter

- (12:31) BUFF – Jasaiah Gathings 10-yard pass from Ta'Quan Roberson, Jack Howes kick (Drive: 6 plays, 75 yards, 2:29; 17-17)
- (6:50) BUFF – Jack Howes 47-yard field goal (Drive: 8 plays, 30 yards, 3:34; Buffalo 20-17)
- (5:32) M-OH – D'Shawntae Jones 7-yard run, Dom Dzioban kick (Drive: 3 plays, 75 yards, 1:18; Miami (OH) 24-20)
- (0:34) M-OH – D'Shawntae Jones 1-yard run, Dom Dzioban kick (Drive: 2 plays, 27 yards, 0:37; Miami (OH) 31-20)

Fourth quarter

- (8:04) M-OH – Dom Dzioban 37-yard field goal (Drive: 7 plays, 25 yards, 3:30; Miami (OH) 34-20)
- (3:44) M-OH – Dom Dzioban 49-yard field goal (Drive: 6 plays, 11 yards, 1:52; Miami (OH) 37-20)

| Statistics | M-OH | BUFF |
|---|---|---|
| First downs | 16 | 21 |
| Plays–yards | 66–347 | 81–349 |
| Rushes–yards | 41–162 | 33–46 |
| Passing yards | 185 | 303 |
| Passing: Comp–Att–Int | 13-25-0 | 24-48-2 |
| Turnovers | 0 | 3 |
| Time of possession | 29:25 | 30:35 |

| Team | Category | Player | Statistics |
|---|---|---|---|
| Miami (OH) | Passing | Thomas Gotkowski | 13/23, 185 yards, TD |
| Miami (OH) | Rushing | Jordan Brunson | 16 carries, 123 yards |
| Miami (OH) | Receiving | Cole Weaver | 5 receptions, 82 yards |
| Buffalo | Passing | Ta'Quan Roberson | 24/48, 303 yards, 2 TD, 2 INT |
| Buffalo | Rushing | Terrance Shelton Jr. | 8 carries, 27 yards |
| Buffalo | Receiving | Nik McMillan | 8 receptions, 147 yards |

=== Ball State ===
Ball State Cardinals (4–7) at Miami RedHawks (6–5) – Game summary

| Quarter | 1 | 2 | 3 | 4 | Total |
|---|---|---|---|---|---|
| Cardinals | 10 | 0 | 0 | 14 | 24 |
| RedHawks | 21 | 10 | 7 | 7 | 45 |

at Yager Stadium • Oxford, OH

- Date: November 29
- Game time: 12:00 PM EST
- Game weather: Cloudy
- Game attendance: 11,137
- Referee: Marcel Kerr
- TV announcers (CBSSN): Fran Charles (play-by-play) and Taylor McHargue (analyst)

Game information

First quarter

- (9:07) M-OH – Braylon Isom 23-yard pass from Thomas Gotkowski, Dom Dzioban kick (Drive: 7 plays, 52 yards, 2:58; Miami (OH) 7-0)
- (8:12) BALL – Jalen Bonds 2-yard run, DC Pippin kick (Drive: 3 plays, 65 yards, 0:55; 7-7)
- (6:26) M-OH – Braylon Isom 10-yard pass from Thomas Gotkowski, Dom Dzioban kick (Drive: 5 plays, 69 yards, 1:39; Miami (OH) 14-7)
- (2:30) BALL – DC Pippin 43-yard field goal (Drive: 7 plays, 53 yards, 3:49; Miami (OH) 14-10)
- (0:21) M-OH – Jordan Brunson 12-yard run, Dom Dzioban kick (Drive: 4 plays, 63 yards, 2:00; Miami (OH) 21-10)

Second quarter

- (10:09) M-OH – Kam Perry 55-yard pass from Thomas Gotkowski, Dom Dzioban kick (Drive: 1 play, 55 yards, 0:08; Miami (OH) 28-10)
- (0:14) M-OH – Dom Dzioban 33-yard field goal (Drive: 11 plays, 41 yards, 3:20; Miami (OH) 31-10)

Third quarter

- (7:34) M-OH – D'Shawntae Jones 1-yard run, Dom Dzioban kick (Drive: 8 plays, 60 yards, 5:05; Miami (OH) 38-10)

Fourth quarter

- (7:44) BALL – Qua Ashley 2-yard pass from Kiael Kelly, DC Pippin kick (Drive: 13 plays, 74 yards, 5:13; Miami (OH) 38-17)
- (2:11) M-OH – Jermaine Agee 0-yard fumble recovery, Kellan McLaughlin kick (Drive: 2 plays, -14 yards, 0:28; Miami (OH) 45-17)
- (1:16) BALL – Eric Weatherly 35-yard pass from Kiael Kelly, DC Pippin kick (Drive: 6 plays, 75 yards, 0:55; Miami (OH) 45-25)

| Statistics | BALL | M-OH |
|---|---|---|
| First downs | 15 | 23 |
| Plays–yards | 59–280 | 66–458 |
| Rushes–yards | 36–103 | 42–232 |
| Passing yards | 177 | 226 |
| Passing: Comp–Att–Int | 14-23-0 | 12-24-0 |
| Turnovers | 1 | 0 |
| Time of possession | 27:26 | 32:34 |

| Team | Category | Player | Statistics |
|---|---|---|---|
| Ball State | Passing | Kiael Kelly | 14/23, 177 yards, 2 TD |
| Ball State | Rushing | Kiael Kelly | 16 carries, 61 yards |
| Ball State | Receiving | Donovan Hamilton | 4 receptions, 72 yards |
| Miami (OH) | Passing | Thomas Gotkowski | 12/24, 226 yards, 3 TD |
| Miami (OH) | Rushing | Jordan Brunson | 14 carries, 54 yards, TD |
| Miami (OH) | Receiving | Cole Weaver | 5 receptions, 66 yards |

=== vs. Western Michigan (MAC Championship Game) ===
2025 MAC Championship Game
Miami RedHawks (7-5) vs. Western Michigan Broncos (8-4) – Game summary

| Quarter | 1 | 2 | 3 | 4 | Total |
|---|---|---|---|---|---|
| RedHawks | 6 | 0 | 0 | 7 | 13 |
| Broncos | 10 | 6 | 7 | 0 | 23 |

at Ford Field • Detroit, MI

- Date: December 6
- Game time: 12:00 PM EST
- Game weather: N/A (indoor)
- Game attendance: 19,114
- Referee: Rick Warne
- TV announcers (ESPN): Roy Philpott (play-by-play), Sam Acho (analyst) and Taylor Davis (sideline)

Game information

First Quarter

- (13:33) WMU - Jalen Buckley 67-yard run, Palmer Domschke kick (Drive: 3 plays, 75 yards, 1:27; Western Michigan 7-0)
- (11:40) M-OH - Jordan Brunson 1-yard run, Dom Dzioban PAT failed (Drive: 5 plays, 75 yards, 1:53; Western Michigan 7-6)
- (6:51) WMU - Palmer Domschke 27-yard field goal (Drive: 10 plays, 66 yards, 4:49; Western Michigan 10-6)

Second Quarter

- (13:43) WMU - Palmer Domschke 31-yard field goal (Drive: 12 plays, 78 yards, 7:02; Western Michigan 13-6)
- (0:50) WMU - Palmer Domschke 50-yard field goal (Drive: 7 plays, 33 yards, 0:57; Western Michigan 16-6)

Third Quarter

- (13:16) WMU - Jalen Buckley 64-yard run, Palmer Domschke kick (Drive: 2 plays, 65 yards, 0:43; Western Michigan 23-6)

Fourth Quarter

- (6:43) M-OH - Cole Weaver 6-yard pass from Henry Hesson, Dom Dzioban kick (Drive: 8 plays, 80 yards, 2:42; Western Michigan 23-13)

| Statistics | M-OH | WMU |
|---|---|---|
| First downs | 18 | 18 |
| Plays–yards | 69–272 | 69–397 |
| Rushes–yards | 31–73 | 56–286 |
| Passing yards | 199 | 111 |
| Passing: Comp–Att–Int | 14–38–0 | 8–13–0 |
| Turnovers | 1 | 0 |
| Time of possession | 24:43 | 35:17 |

| Team | Category | Player | Statistics |
|---|---|---|---|
| Miami (OH) | Passing | Henry Hesson | 7/20, 107 yards, TD |
| Miami (OH) | Rushing | Jordan Brunson | 14 carries, 59 yards, TD |
| Miami (OH) | Receiving | Kam Perry | 7 receptions, 101 yards |
| Western Michigan | Passing | Broc Lowry | 8/13, 111 yards |
| Western Michigan | Rushing | Jalen Buckley | 19 carries, 193 yards, 2 TD |
| Western Michigan | Receiving | Michael Brescia | 2 receptions, 47 yards |

=== vs. Fresno State (Arizona Bowl) ===
2025 Snoop Dogg Arizona Bowl
Miami RedHawks (7-6) vs. Fresno State Bulldogs (8-4) – Game summary

| Quarter | 1 | 2 | 3 | 4 | Total |
|---|---|---|---|---|---|
| RedHawks | 3 | 0 | 0 | 0 | 3 |
| Bulldogs | 0 | 9 | 0 | 9 | 18 |

at Casino Del Sol Stadium • Tucson, AZ

- Date: December 27
- Game time: 1:30 PM PST
- Referee: Rodney Burnette
- TV announcers (The CW): Thom Brennaman (play-by-play), Will Blackmon (analyst) and Wes Bryant (sideline)

Game information

First quarter

- (9:09) M-OH – Dom Dzioban 33-yard field goal (Drive: 9 plays, 45 yards, 3:40; Miami-Ohio 3–0)

Second quarter

- (7:54) FRES – Dylan Lynch 28-yard field goal (Drive: 15 plays, 82 yards, 8:00; Tied 3–3)
- (5:00) FRES – Dylan Lynch 23-yard field goal (Drive: 4 plays, 5 yards, 1:25; Fresno State 6–3)
- (0:00) FRES – Dylan Lynch 25-yard field goal (Drive: 6 plays, 71 yards, 1:09; Fresno State 9–3)

Third quarter

- No scoring plays.

Fourth quarter

- (11:12) FRES – Richie Anderson III 2-yard pass from E.J. Warner, (pass faield) (Drive: 13 plays, 70 yards, 6:23; Fresno State 15–3)
- (2:56) FRES – Dylan Lynch 37-yard field goal (Drive: 10 plays, 44 yards, 5:36; Fresno State 18–3)

| Statistics | M-OH | FRES |
|---|---|---|
| First downs | 12 | 18 |
| Plays–yards | 48–192 | 71–296 |
| Rushes–yards | 26–120 | 49–177 |
| Passing yards | 72 | 219 |
| Passing: Comp–Att–Int | 6–22–1 | 15–22–0 |
| Turnovers | 2 | 0 |
| Time of possession | 21:20 | 38:40 |

| Team | Category | Player | Statistics |
|---|---|---|---|
| Miami (OH) | Passing | Thomas Gotkowski | 6/22, 72 yards, INT |
| Miami (OH) | Rushing | Keith Reynolds | 3 carries, 46 yards |
| Miami (OH) | Receiving | Cole Weaver | 2 receptions, 43 yards |
| Fresno State | Passing | E.J. Warner | 15/22, 219 yards, TD |
| Fresno State | Rushing | Brandon Ramirez | 11 carries, 53 yards |
| Fresno State | Receiving | Josiah Freeman | 7 receptions, 143 yards |
