= Matt Drinkall =

American football coach (born 1982)

Current position
- Title: Head coach
- Team: Central Michigan
- Conference: MAC
- Record: 12–12

Biographical details
- Born: November 8, 1982 (age 44); Bettendorf, Iowa, U.S.

Playing career
- 2001: Iowa

Coaching career (HC unless noted)
- 2003–2005: Bettendorf HS (IA) (WR/DC)
- 2006–2007: Western Illinois (TE)
- 2008: St. Ambrose (assistant)
- 2009: St. Ambrose (WR)
- 2010–2011: St. Ambrose (OL)
- 2012–2013: St. Ambrose (OC)
- 2014–2018: Kansas Wesleyan
- 2019: Army (OQC)
- 2020–2022: Army (TE)
- 2023: Army (co-OC/OL)
- 2024: Army (OL)
- 2025–present: Central Michigan

Head coaching record
- Overall: 54–29
- Bowls: 0–1
- Tournaments: 2–2 (NAIA playoffs)

Accomplishments and honors

Championships
- 1 KCAC (2018)

Matt Drinkall (born November 8, 1982) is an American college football coach who is the head football coach at Central Michigan University. He previously held various offensive coaching positions at the United States Military Academy.

Drinkall began his coaching career as a student assistant coach in 2002 for Kirk Ferentz at the University of Iowa, after suffering a career ending injury as a wide receiver for the Hawkeyes.

He previously served as the head football coach of Kansas Wesleyan University in Salina, Kansas, starting in January 2014. He had worked previously as a football coach at the high school and college levels before being hired as head coach. In 2015, Drinkall was the second-youngest head college football coach in the country behind Cornell's David Archer and took the Coyotes to the 2015 playoffs.

On January 14, 2019, Drinkall announced his resignation of the head coaching position at Kansas Wesleyan to join the staff of the Army Black Knights as an offensive quality control coach. He had compiled a 42–17 record as head coach. Drinkall has worked primarily on the offensive side of the ball.

On December 9, 2024, Drinkall was hired by Central Michigan University as the next head coach.

== Personal life ==
Drinkall grew up in Bettendorf, Iowa and attended Bettendorf High School where he played football and ran track.

He was briefly a wide receiver for the Iowa Hawkeyes before an injury ended his playing career and set his coaching career in motion as a student assistant for Iowa.

== Head coaching record ==
Year	Team	Overall	Conference	Standing	Bowl/playoffs	NAIA^{#}
Kansas Wesleyan (Kansas Collegiate Athletic Conference) (2014–2018)
2014	Kansas Wesleyan	2–9	2–7	T–8th		
2015	Kansas Wesleyan	10–2	8–1	2nd	L NAIA First Round	14
2016	Kansas Wesleyan	9–2	7–2	T–2nd		17
2017	Kansas Wesleyan	8–3	7–2	3rd		21
2018	Kansas Wesleyan	13–1	10–0	1st	L NAIA Semifinal	6
Kansas Wesleyan:		42–17	34–12			
Central Michigan (Mid-American Conference) (2025–present)
2025	Central Michigan	7–6	5–3	5th	L GameAbove Sports	
2026	Central Michigan	5-6	3-4			
Central Michigan:		12–12	8–7			
Total:		54–29				
National championship Conference title Conference division title or championship game berth
