= Broc Lowry =

American football quarterback (born 2004)

No. 12 – Western Michigan Broncos
- Position: Quarterback
- Class: Redshirt Junior

Personal information
- Born: May 5, 2004 (age 22); Canfield, Ohio, U.S.
- Listed height: 6 ft 1 in (1.85 m)
- Listed weight: 210 lb (95 kg)

Career information
- High school: Canfield
- College: Indiana (2023); Western Michigan (2024–present)

Awards and highlights
- MAC Offensive Player of the Year (2025); First-team All-MAC (2025)
- Stats at ESPN

Broc Lowry (born May 5, 2004) is an American football quarterback for the Western Michigan Broncos. He previously played for the Indiana Hoosiers.

== Early life ==
Lowry attended Canfield High School in Canfield, Ohio. Coming out of high school, he was rated as a three-star recruit and committed to play college football for the Indiana Hoosiers over other offers from schools such as Iowa State, Toledo, Miami Ohio, Western Michigan, and Dartmouth.

== College career ==
=== Indiana ===
Lowry was redshirted in 2023 after appearing in four games and completing his only pass attempt for eight yards. After the season, he entered his name into the NCAA transfer portal.

=== Western Michigan ===
Lowry transferred to play for the Western Michigan Broncos. In 2024, he played in 11 games, going four for eight passing for 21 yards, while also adding 133 yards and three touchdowns on the ground. In week 2 of the 2025 season, Lowry passed for 75 yards and a touchdown, while rushing for 66 yards and two touchdowns in an overtime loss to North Texas. In week 4, he threw for 201 yards and rushed for 50 yards and two touchdowns in a comeback win over Toledo, after which he was named the team's full-time starting quarterback after splitting time with Brady Jones. In week 6, Lowry completed 18 of 25 pass attempts for 163 yards and a touchdown, while also rushing 14 times for 92 yards and a touchdown in a 21–3 win over UMass. In week 7, he went 23 for 27 on his passes for 241 yards and two touchdowns, while also notching 108 yards and a touchdown on the ground in a blowout win against Ball State. In week 13, Lowry completed five passes for 32 yards, while also rushing for 100 yards and three touchdowns in a victory versus Northern Illinois. In the 2025 MAC Football Championship Game, he completed eight of his 13 pass attempts for 111 yards, while also adding 65 yards on the ground, as he helped the Broncos beat Miami Ohio. For his performance during the 2025 season, Lowry was named first-team all-MAC and the MAC offensive player of the year.

=== College statistics ===
Legend
**Bold**	Career High

Season	Team	Games			Passing								Rushing			
Season	Team	GP	GS	Record	Cmp	Att	Pct	Yds	Y/A	TD	Int	Rtg	Att	Yds	Avg	TD
2023	Indiana	4	0	—	1	1	**100.0**	8	**8.0**	0	0	**167.2**	0	0	0.0	0
2024	Western Michigan	11	0	—	4	8	50.0	21	2.6	0	0	72.1	25	133	**5.3**	3
2025	Western Michigan	**14**	**11**	**10–1**	**166**	**262**	63.4	**1,803**	6.9	**9**	**3**	130.2	**203**	**963**	4.7	**14**
2026	Western Michigan	7	7	5–2	100	147	68.0	1,044	7.1	8	1	144.3	72	238	3.3	3
Career		36	18	15–3	271	418	64.8	2,876	6.9	17	4	134.1	300	1,334	4.4	20
