= Akron Zips football statistical leaders =

The Akron Zips football statistical leaders are individual statistical leaders of the Akron Zips football program in various categories, including passing, rushing, receiving, total offense, defensive stats, and kicking. Within those areas, the lists identify single-game, single-season, and career leaders. The Zips represent the University of Akron in the NCAA's Mid-American Conference.

Although Akron began competing in intercollegiate football in 1891, the school's official record book considers the "modern era" to have begun in 1954. Records from before this year are often incomplete and inconsistent, and they are generally not included in these lists.

These lists are dominated by more recent players for several reasons:

- Since 1954, seasons have increased from 10 games to 11 and then 12 games in length.
- The NCAA didn't allow freshmen to play varsity football until 1972 (with the exception of the World War II years), allowing players to have four-year careers.
- Bowl games only began counting toward single-season and career statistics in 2002. The Zips have played in three bowl games since this decision, giving many recent players an extra game to accumulate statistics. These games include the 2005 Motor City Bowl, and there is a large uptick in players achieving entires on this list around the 2005 season

These lists are updated through the end of the 2025 season. The latest Akron media guide does not list a full top 10 for most touchdown scoring records.

== Passing ==
=== Passing yards ===
Career
Rk	Player	Yards	Years
1	Charlie Frye	11,049	2001 2002 2003 2004
2	Thomas Woodson	6,864	2014 2015 2016 2017
3	James Washington	6,699	1997 1998 1999 2000
4	Luke Getsy	6,117	2005 2006
5	Kato Nelson	5,585	2017 2018 2019 2021
6	Kyle Pohl	5,128	2012 2013 2014 2015
7	Ben Finley	5,079	2024 2025
8	Chris Jacquemain	4,691	2007 2008 2009
9	DJ Irons	4,219	2021 2022 2023
10	Mike Johnson	3,989	1988 1989

Single season
Rk	Player	Yards	Year
1	Charlie Frye	3,549	2003
2	Luke Getsy	3,455	2005
3	Dalton Williams	3,387	2012
4	Charlie Frye	2,824	2002
5	Chris Jacquemain	2,748	2008
6	Luke Getsy	2,662	2006
7	Charlie Frye	2,623	2004
8	DJ Irons	2,605	2022
9	Ben Finley	2,604	2024
10	Ben Finley	2,475	2025

Single game
Rk	Player	Yards	Year	Opponent
1	Luke Getsy	455	2005	Memphis
2	Dalton Williams	446	2012	Miami (Ohio)
	Dalton Williams	446	2012	Morgan State
4	Charlie Frye	436	2004	Miami (Ohio)
5	Ben Finley	424	2025	Kent State
6	DJ Irons	418	2022	Ohio
7	Charlie Frye	416	2003	Central Michigan
8	Luke Getsy	413	2005	Northern Illinois
9	Charlie Frye	407	2003	Kent State
	Thomas Woodson	407	2016	VMI

=== Passing touchdowns ===
Career
Rk	Player	TDs	Years
1	Charlie Frye	64	2001 2002 2003 2004
2	Thomas Woodson	53	2014 2015 2016 2017
3	Luke Getsy	41	2005 2006
4	James Washington	38	1997 1998 1999 2000
5	Kato Nelson	37	2017 2018 2019 2021
6	Chris Jacquemain	35	2007 2008 2009
	Ben Finley	35	2024 2025
8	Kyle Pohl	28	2012 2013 2014 2015
9	Dalton Williams	25	2012
10	DJ Irons	21	2021 2022 2023

Single season
Rk	Player	TDs	Year
1	Dalton Williams	25	2012
2	Luke Getsy	23	2005
3	Charlie Frye	22	2003
4	Chris Jacquemain	20	2008
5	Ben Finley	19	2025
6	Charlie Frye	18	2004
	Luke Getsy	18	2006
	Thomas Woodson	18	2016
9	James Washington	17	2000
10	Thomas Woodson	16	2015
	Ben Finley	16	2024

Single game
Rk	Player	TDs	Year	Opponent
1	Thomas Woodson	6	2016	VMI
2	Luke Getsy	5	2005	Northern Illinois
	Dalton Williams	5	2012	Morgan State

== Rushing ==
=== Rushing yards ===
Career
Rk	Player	Yards	Years
1	Mike Clark	4,257	1984 1985 1986
2	Jawon Chisholm	3,403	2011 2012 2013 2014
3	James R. Black	3,054	1980 1981 1982 1983
4	Jack Beidleman	3,032	1967 1968 1969 1970
5	Brandon Payne	2,861	1999 2000 2001 2002
6	Bobby Hendry	2,847	2000 2001 2002 2003
7	Billy Mills	2,816	1973 1974 1975 1976
8	Paul Winters	2,613	1976 1977 1978 1979
9	Dennis Kennedy	2,522	2005 2006 2007 2008
10	Dennis Brumfield	2,314	1979 1980 1981

Single season
Rk	Player	Yards	Year
1	Mike Clark	1,786	1986
2	James R. Black	1,568	1983
3	Dennis Kennedy	1,321	2008
4	Mike Clark	1,299	1985
5	Paul Winters	1,298	1979
6	Brett Biggs	1,230	2005
7	James R. Black	1,188	1982
8	Mike Clark	1,172	1984
9	Brandon Payne	1,062	2000
10	Jack Beidleman	1,050	1969

Single game
Rk	Player	Yards	Year	Opponent
1	James R. Black	295	1983	Austin Peay
2	Dennis Kennedy	277	2008	Eastern Michigan
3	Mike Clark	255	1986	UCF
4	James R. Black	246	1983	Youngstown State
5	Ron Tyson	243	1966	Northern Illinois
6	Bobby Hendry	240	2002	Liberty
7	Mike Clark	229	1986	Tennessee Tech
8	Mike Clark	220	1986	Youngstown State
9	Jack Beidleman	216	1969	Eastern Kentucky
10	Mike Clark	209	1984	Cincinnati

=== Rushing touchdowns ===
Career
Rk	Player	TDs	Years
1	Brandon Payne	39	1999 2000 2001 2002
2	Bobby Hendry	32	2000 2001 2002 2003
3	Dennis Kennedy	27	2005 2006 2007 2008
4	Jawon Chisholm	26	2011 2012 2013 2014
5	Greg Lomax	23	1995 1996 1997 1998
	Alex Allen	23	2005 2006 2007 2008 2009 2010
7	Brett Biggs	20	2004 2005
8	Charlie Frye	19	2001 2002 2003 2004
9	Doug Lewis	18	1988 1989 1990
10	Conor Hundley	17	2012 2013 2014 2015

Single season
Rk	Player	TDs	Year
1	Dennis Kennedy	17	2008

Single game
Rk	Player	TDs	Year	Opponent
1	Terry Cameron	5	1978	Northern Iowa
	Bobby Hendry	5	2001	Eastern Michigan

== Receiving ==
=== Receptions ===
Career
Rk	Player	Rec	Years
1	Jabari Arthur	184	2004 2005 2006 2007
2	Matt Cherry	149	2000 2001 2002 2003
3	Domenik Hixon	141	2002 2003 2004 2005
4	Lavel Bailey	138	1997 1998 1999 2000
5	Jake Schifino	131	1998 1999 2000 2001
6	Dan Ruff	127	1967 1968 1969 1970
7	Zach D'Orazio	119	2012 2013 2014
	Daniel George	119	2022 2023
9	Keith Sconiers	114	2010 2011 2012 2013
10	Marquelo Suel	110	2011 2012

Single season
Rk	Player	Rec	Year
1	Jabari Arthur	86	2007
2	Marquelo Suel	76	2012
3	Domenik Hixon	75	2005
4	Shocky Jacques-Louis	74	2022
5	Daniel George	67	2022
6	Matt Cherry	66	2003
7	Domenik Hixon	66	2004
8	Brett Biggs	65	2005
9	Deryn Bowser	64	2008
10	Konata Mumpfield	63	2021
	Alex Adams	63	2022

Single game
Rk	Player	Rec	Year	Opponent
1	Jabari Arthur	15	2007	Western Michigan
2	Marcel Williams	14	2025	Kent State
3	Jim Lupori	13	1960	Muskingum
	Willie Davis	13	1984	Kent State
	Domenik Hixon	13	2004	Marshall
6	Lavel Bailey	12	1998	Marshall
	Matt Cherry	12	2002	Miami (Ohio)
	Marquelo Suel	12	2012	Tennessee

=== Receiving yards ===
Career
Rk	Player	Yards	Years
1	Jabari Arthur	2,653	2004 2005 2006 2007
2	Lavel Bailey	2,577	1997 1998 1999 2000
3	Dan Ruff	2,531	1967 1968 1969 1970
4	Domenik Hixon	2,092	2002 2003 2004 2005
5	Matt Cherry	1,997	2000 2001 2002 2003
6	Jake Schifino	1,986	1998 1999 2000 2001
7	Jerome Lane	1,800	2014 2015 2016
8	Mac Thomas	1,738	1970 1971 1972 1973
9	Willie Davis	1,718	1983 1984 1985

Single season
Rk	Player	Yards	Year
1	Domenik Hixon	1,210	2005
2	Jabari Arthur	1,171	2007
3	Dan Ruff	1,041	1968
4	Jerome Lane	1,018	2016
5	Lavel Bailey	941	1999
6	Shocky Jacques-Louis	931	2022
7	David Harvey	914	2006
8	Matt Cherry	904	2003
9	Domenik Hixon	882	2004
10	Willie Davis	878	1984

Single game
Rk	Player	Yards	Year	Opponent
1	Jabari Arthur	223	2007	Western Michigan
2	Dustin Burkhart	217	2019	UAB
3	Marcel Williams	206	2025	Kent State
4	Lavel Bailey	201	1998	Marshall
5	Alex Adams	199	2022	Kent State
6	Jerome Lane	197	2016	VMI
7	Dan Ruff	195	1969	Ball State
8	Domenik Hixon	192	2004	Marshall
9	Matt Cherry	189	2001	Miami (Ohio)
10	Harold Robinson	184	1991	Temple

=== Receiving touchdowns ===
Career
Rk	Player	TDs	Years
1	Dan Ruff	27	1967 1968 1969 1970
2	Lavel Bailey	21	1997 1998 1999 2000
3	Jabari Arthur	17	2004 2005 2006 2007
4	Mac Thomas	15	1970 1971 1972 1973
5	Domenik Hixon	14	2002 2003 2004 2005
	Jerome Lane	14	2014 2015 2016
7	Austin Wolf	13	2014 2015 2016 2017

Single season
Rk	Player	TDs	Year
1	Dan Ruff	11	1968
2	Dan Ruff	10	1969
	David Harvey	10	2006
	Jabari Arthur	10	2007
	JoJo Natson	10	2016
6	Lavel Bailey	9	1999
	Jerrod Dillard	9	2012
	Alex Adams	9	2022

Single game
Rk	Player	TDs	Year	Opponent
1	Dan Ruff	4	1969	Ball State

== Total offense ==
Total offense is the sum of passing and rushing statistics. It does not include receiving or returns.

=== Total offense yards ===
Career
Rk	Player	Yards	Years
1	Charlie Frye	11,478	2001 2002 2003 2004
2	Thomas Woodson	7,595	2014 2015 2016 2017
3	James Washington	7,024	1997 1998 1999 2000
4	Kato Nelson	6,280	2017 2018 2019 2021
5	Luke Getsy	5,946	2005 2006
6	Kyle Pohl	5,269	2012 2013 2014 2015
7	Ben Finley	5,261	2024 2025
8	DJ Irons	5,044	2021 2022 2023
9	Vernon Stewart	4,735	1983 1984 1985 1986
10	Mike Johnson	4,649	1988 1989

Single season
Rk	Player	Yards	Year
1	Charlie Frye	3,837	2003
2	Luke Getsy	3,426	2005
3	Dalton Williams	3,262	2012
4	Charlie Frye	2,949	2002
5	DJ Irons	2,919	2022
6	Thomas Woodson	2,802	2015
7	Chris Jacquemain	2,794	2008
8	Thomas Woodson	2,793	2015
9	Ben Finley	2,656	2024
10	Kato Nelson	2,632	2019

Single game
Rk	Player	Yards	Year	Opponent
1	Charlie Frye	460	2003	Central Michigan
2	Dalton Williams	446	2012	Morgan State
	Dalton Williams	446	2012	Miami (Ohio)
4	DJ Irons	441	2022	Ohio
5	Luke Getsy	438	2005	Memphis
6	DJ Irons	432	2021	Bryant
7	Ben Finley	426	2025	Kent State
8	Luke Getsy	420	2005	Northern Illinois
	Thomas Woodson	420	2016	VMI
	DJ Irons	420	2022	Kent State

=== Touchdowns responsible for ===
"Touchdowns responsible for" is the NCAA's official term for combined passing and rushing touchdowns.

Career
Rk	Player	TDs	Years
1	Charlie Frye	83	2001 2002 2003 2004

Single season
Rk	Player	TDs	Year
1	Charlie Frye	29	2003

== Defense ==
=== Interceptions ===
Career
Rk	Player	Ints	Years
1	Gary Tyler	18	1985 1986 1987
2	Dwight Smith	15	1997 1998 1999 2000
	Reggie Corner	15	2004 2005 2006 2007
4	Dick Miller	13+	1937 1938
5	Roosevelt Jewells	13	1979 1980 1981
	Shawn Vincent	13	1989 1990
7	Curtis Howard	12	1977 1978 1979
8	Chris Owens	11	1991 1992
	Rickey McKenzie	11	2001 2002 2003

Single season
Rk	Player	Ints	Year
1	Dick Miller	13	1937
2	Dwight Smith	10	2000
3	Curtis Howard	8	1977
	Roosevelt Jewells	8	1981
	Brett Jackson	8	1990
	Shawn Vincent	8	1990
	Chris Owens	8	1992
	Reggie Corner	8	2007

Single game
Rk	Player	Ints	Year	Opponent
1	Dick Miller	6	1937	Balwin-Wallace

=== Tackles ===
Career
Rk	Player	Tackles	Years
1	Steve Cockerham	715	1974 1975 1976 1977
2	Brad Reese	710	1978 1979 1980 1981

Single season
Rk	Player	Tackles	Year
1	Brad Reese	221	1980
2	Brad Reese	214	1979
3	Phil Dunn	201	1992
4	Steve Cockerham	193	1975

Single game
Rk	Player	Tackles	Year	Opponent
1	Brad Reese	35	1980	Western Kentucky

=== Sacks ===
Career
Rk	Player	Sacks	Years
1	Jason Taylor	21.0	1993 1994 1995 1996

Single season
Rk	Player	Sacks	Year
1	Jatavis Brown	12.0	2015
2	Ken Williams	10.0	1993
	Jason Taylor	10.0	1996

== Kicking ==
=== Field goals made ===
Career
Rk	Player	FGs	Years
1	Bob Dombroski	51	1986 1987 1988 1989
2	Zac Derr	47	1998 1999 2000 2001
3	Robert Stein	46	2012 2013 2014 2015
4	Daron Alcorn	45	1989 1990 1991 1992
5	Igor Iveljic	42	2007 2008 2009 2010
6	Jason Swiger	38	2003 2004 2005
7	Dennis Heckman	35	1981 1982 1983
8	Andy Graham	31	1977 1978 1979 1980

Single season
Rk	Player	FGs	Year
1	Russ Klaus	19	1985
2	Daron Alcorn	18	1992
	Igor Iveljic	18	2008
4	Dennis Heckman	17	1983
5	Andy Graham	16	1979
	Bob Dombroski	16	1988
	Nick Gasser	16	2018
8	Igor Iveljic	15	2007
	Robert Stein	15	2015

Single game
Rk	Player	FGs	Year	Opponent
1	Andy Graham	5	1979	Eastern Illinois
	Russ Klaus	5	1985	Bowling Green
	Daron Alcorn	5	1992	Temple
