= 2025 Wyoming Cowboys football team =

American college football season

2025 Wyoming Cowboys football
- Conference: Mountain West Conference
- Record: 4–8 (2–6 MW)
- Head coach: Jay Sawvel (2nd season)
- Offensive coordinator: Jay Johnson (2nd season; first 7 games); Jovon Bouknight (interim; final 5 games)
- Offensive scheme: Multiple
- Defensive coordinator: Aaron Bohl (2nd season)
- Base defense: 4–3
- Home stadium: War Memorial Stadium

2025 Mountain West Conference football standings
	Conf.			Overall
Team	W		L	W		L
Boise State y$	6	–	2	9	–	5
UNLV y	6	–	2	10	–	4
San Diego State	6	–	2	9	–	4
New Mexico	6	–	2	9	–	4
Fresno State	5	–	3	9	–	4
Hawaii	5	–	3	9	–	4
Utah State	4	–	4	6	–	7
Air Force	3	–	5	4	–	8
Nevada	2	–	6	3	–	9
Wyoming	2	–	6	4	–	8
San Jose State	2	–	6	3	–	9
Colorado State	1	–	7	2	–	10
Championship: Boise State 38, UNLV 21
$ – Conference champion; y – Championship game participant; Rankings from CFP Rankings

The 2025 Wyoming Cowboys football team represented the University of Wyoming as a member of the Mountain West Conference (MW) during the 2025 NCAA Division I FBS football season. Led by second-year head coach Jay Sawvel, the Cowboys played home games on campus, at War Memorial Stadium in Laramie, Wyoming.

== Schedule ==
Date	Time	Opponent	Site	TV	Result	Attendance
August 28	5:00 p.m.	at Akron*	InfoCision Stadium–Summa Field; Akron, OH	ESPN+	W 10–0	9,138
September 6	2:00 p.m.	Northern Iowa*	War Memorial Stadium; Laramie, WY	Altitude2	W 31–7	25,009
September 13	6:00 p.m.	No. 20 Utah*	War Memorial Stadium; Laramie, WY	CBSSN	L 6–31	23,500
September 20	8:15 p.m.	at Colorado*	Folsom Field; Boulder, CO	ESPN	L 20–37	53,442
October 4	5:00 p.m.	UNLV^{†}	War Memorial Stadium; Laramie, WY	CBSSN	L 17–31	19,861
October 11	5:00 p.m.	San Jose State	War Memorial Stadium; Laramie, WY	CBSSN	W 35–28	20,970
October 18	1:30 p.m.	at Air Force	Falcon Stadium; Colorado Springs, CO	CBSSN	L 21–24	23,401
October 25	5:30 p.m.	Colorado State	War Memorial Stadium; Laramie, WY (Border War)	CBSSN	W 28–0	25,609
November 1	5:00 p.m.	at San Diego State	Snapdragon Stadium; San Diego, CA	CBSSN	L 7–24	24,325
November 15	8:30 p.m.	at Fresno State	Valley Children's Stadium; Fresno, CA	FS1	L 3–24	35,076
November 22	12:00 p.m.	Nevada	War Memorial Stadium; Laramie, WY	Altitude	L 7–13	25,650
November 29	9:00 p.m.	at Hawaii	Clarence T. C. Ching Athletics Complex; Honolulu, HI (rivalry)	Spectrum Sports	L 7–27	15,194
*Non-conference game; ^{†}Homecoming; Rankings from AP Poll - Released prior to game; All times are in Mountain time

== Preseason ==
=== Mountain West preseason media poll ===
The Mountain West's preseason media poll was released on July 16, 2025. Wyoming was predicted to finished tenth in the conference.

== Game summaries ==
=== at Akron ===
Wyoming Cowboys (0–0) at Arkon Zips (0–0) – Game summary

Quarter	1	2	3	4	Total
Cowboys	0	3	0	7	10
Zips	0	0	0	0	0

at InfoCision Stadium–Summa Field • Akron, Ohio

- Date: August 28
- Game time: 7:00 p.m. EDT
- Game attendance: 9,138
- Referee: Matt Packowski
- TV announcers (ESPN+): Michael Reghi and Ryan Cavanaugh

Game information

First quarter

- No scoring plays.

Second quarter

- WYO – Erik Sandvik 25-yard field goal, 5:20. Cowboys 3–0. Drive: 8 plays, 54 yards, 2:22.

Third quarter

- No scoring plays.

Fourth quarter

- WYO – Chris Durr Jr. 35-yard pass from Kaden Anderson (Erik Sandvik kick), 4:26. Cowboys 10–0. Drive: 4 plays, 85 yards, 1:49.

Statistics	WYO	AKR
First downs	19	13
Plays–yards	75–426	66–228
Rushes–yards	39–166	28–89
Passing yards	260	139
Passing: Comp–Att–Int	19–36–1	16–38–1
Turnovers	1	1
Time of possession	33:16	26:44

Team	Category	Player	Statistics
Wyoming	Passing	Kaden Anderson	19/36, 260 yards, TD, INT
Wyoming	Rushing	Sam Scott	29 carries, 132 yards
Wyoming	Receiving	Chris Durr Jr.	8 receptions, 190 yards, TD
Akron	Passing	Ben Finley	16/38, 139 yards, INT
Akron	Rushing	Marquese Williams	6 carries, 30 yards
Akron	Receiving	Sean Patrick	4 receptions, 47 yards

=== vs Northern Iowa (FCS) ===
Northern Iowa Panthers (FCS) (1–0) at Wyoming Cowboys (1–0) – Game summary

Quarter	1	2	3	4	Total
Panthers (FCS)	0	7	0	0	7
Cowboys	7	10	7	7	31

at War Memorial Stadium • Laramie, WY

- Date: September 6, 2025
- Game time: 2:00 p.m. MDT
- Game attendance: 25,009
- Referee: Cal McNeil
- TV announcers (Altitude 2): Nate Kreckman and Jared Petrino

Game information

First quarter

- WYO – Sam Scott 18-yard run (Erik Sandvik kick), 3:26. Cowboys 7–0. Drive: 5 plays, 78 yards, 2:05.

Second quarter

- UNI – Harrison Bey-Buie 2-yard run (Max Bartachek kick), 7:25. Tied 7–7. Drive: 11 plays, 90 yards, 6:34.
- WYO – John Michael Gyllenborg 6-yard pass from Kaden Anderson (Erik Sandvik kick), 1:13. Cowboys 14–7. Drive: 8 plays, 45 yards, 3:30.
- WYO – Erik Sandvik 40-yard field goal, 0:00. Cowboys 17–7. Drive: 3 plays, 12 yards, 0:26.

Third quarter

- WYO – Chris Durr Jr. 21-yard pass from Kaden Anderson (Erik Sandvik kick), 6:03. Cowboys 24–7. Drive: 10 plays, 76 yards, 4:31.

Fourth quarter

- WYO – Samuel Harris 18-yard run (Erik Sandvik kick), 7:12. Cowboys 31–7. Drive: 5 plays, 60 yards, 2:44.

Statistics	UNI	WYO
First downs	13	25
Plays–yards	58–170	63–379
Rushes–yards	29–59	37–189
Passing yards	111	190
Passing: Comp–Att–Int	16–29–2	20–26–0
Turnovers	2	1
Time of possession	30:41	29:19

Team	Category	Player	Statistics
Northern Iowa	Passing	Matthew Schecklman	15/26, 107 yards, 2 INT
Northern Iowa	Rushing	Christian Collins	4 carries, 22 yards
Northern Iowa	Receiving	Tysen Kershaw	6 receptions, 41 yards
Wyoming	Passing	Kaden Anderson	17/23, 167 yards, 2 TD
Wyoming	Rushing	Terron Kellman	7 carries, 87 yards
Wyoming	Receiving	John Michael Gyllenborg	5 receptions, 65 yards, TD

=== No. 20 Utah ===
No. 20 Utah Utes (2–0) at Wyoming Cowboys (2–0) – Game summary

Quarter	1	2	3	4	Total
No. 20 Utes	3	0	14	14	31
Cowboys	0	0	0	6	6

at War Memorial Stadium • Laramie, WY

- Date: September 13, 2025
- Game time: 6:00 p.m. MDT
- Game weather: Cloudy • Temperature: 52 °F (11 °C) • Wind: NE 7 mph
- Game attendance: 23,500
- Referee: Christian Watson
- TV announcers (CBSSN): Rich Waltz, Robert Turbin, and Jordan Georgio

Game information

First quarter

- (10:22) UTAH – Dillon Curtis 43-yard field goal (Drive: 9 plays, 48 yards, 3:46; Utah 3–0)

Second quarter

- No scoring plays.

Third quarter

- (10:46) UTAH – NaQuari Rogers 1-yard run, Dillon Curtis kick (Drive: 10 plays, 83 yards, 4:08; Utah 10–0)
- (0:23) UTAH – Larry Simmons 8-yard pass from Devon Dampier, Dillon Curtis kick (Drive: 19 plays, 78 yards, 7:23; Utah 17–0)

Fourth quarter

- (8:35) UTAH – JJ Buchanan 14-yard pass from Devon Dampier, Dillon Curtis kick (Drive: 3 plays, 18 yards, 1:23; Utah 24–0)
- (4:23) WYO – Terron Kellman 15-yard run (Drive: 8 plays, 75 yards, 4:12; Utah 24–6)
- (1:11) UTAH – Hunter Andrews 11-yard run, Dillon Curtis kick (Drive: 6 plays, 75 yards, 3:12; Utah 31–6)

Statistics	UTAH	WYO
First downs	31	15
Plays–yards	86–541	57–229
Rushes–yards	45–311	34–121
Passing yards	230	108
Passing: comp–att–int	27–41–0	12–23–1
Turnovers	1	2
Time of possession	35:30	24:30

Team	Category	Player	Statistics
Utah	Passing	Devon Dampier	27/41, 230 yards, 2 TD
Utah	Rushing	Devon Dampier	13 carries, 86 yards
Utah	Receiving	Ryan Davis	10 receptions, 91 yards
Wyoming	Passing	Kaden Anderson	12/23, 108 yards, INT
Wyoming	Rushing	Samuel Harris	8 carries, 68 yards
Wyoming	Receiving	Chris Durr	5 receptions, 40 yards

=== at Colorado ===
Wyoming Cowboys (2–1) at Colorado Buffaloes (1–2) – Game summary

Quarter	1	2	3	4	Total
Cowboys	0	3	10	7	20
Buffaloes	0	21	7	9	37

at Folsom Field • Boulder, CO

- Date: September 20, 2025
- Game time: 8:15 p.m. MDT
- Game weather: Cloudy; 68 °F (20 °C)
- Game attendance: 53,442
- Referee: Luke Richmond
- TV announcers (ESPN): Dave Flemming, Brock Osweiler and Stormy Buonantony

Game information

First quarter

- No scoring plays.

Second quarter

- (14:12) COLO – Omarion Miller 29-yard pass from Kaidon Salter, Alejandro Mata kick (Drive: 13 plays, 85 yards, 5:52; Colorado 7–0)
- (9:39) WYO – Erik Sandvik 28-yard field goal (Drive: 10 plays, 65 yards, 4:33; Colorado 7–3)
- (7:37) COLO – Sincere Brown 68-yard pass from Kaidon Salter, Alejandro Mata kick (Drive: 5 plays, 81 yards, 1:57; Colorado 14–3)
- (3:08) COLO – Simeon Price 1-yard run, Alejandro Mata kick (Drive: 8 plays, 67 yards, 2:42; Colorado 21–3)

Third quarter

- (13:55) COLO – Joseph Williams 47-yard pass from Kaidon Salter, Alejandro Mata kick (Drive: 3 plays, 75 yards, 1:05; Colorado 28–3)
- (12:25) WYO – Eric Richardson 41-yard pass from Kaden Anderson (Drive: 4 plays, 75 yards, 1:30; Colorado 28–10)
- (3:30) WYO – Erik Sandvik 38-yard field goal (Drive: 13 plays, 73 yards, 6:25; Colorado 28–13)

Fourth quarter

- (14:55) COLO – Arden Walker safety (Colorado 30–13)
- (4:32) WYO – Chris Durr Jr. 7-yard pass from Kaden Anderson (Drive: 13 plays, 80 yards, 6:49; Colorado 30–20)
- (1:46) COLO – Kaidon Salter 35-yard run, Alejandro Mata kick (Drive: 7 plays, 75 yards, 2:46; Colorado 37–20)

Statistics	WYO	COLO
First downs	20	23
Plays–yards	67–347	59–497
Rushes–yards	41–165	31–193
Passing yards	182	304
Passing: comp–att–int	12–26–0	18–28–0
Turnovers	0	1
Time of possession	32:04	27:56

Team	Category	Player	Statistics
Wyoming	Passing	Kaden Anderson	11/25, 176 yards, 2 TD
Wyoming	Rushing	Samuel Harris	19 carries, 126 yards
Wyoming	Receiving	Chris Durr Jr.	5 receptions, 50 yards, TD
Colorado	Passing	Kaidon Salter	18/28, 304 yards, 3 TD
Colorado	Rushing	Kaidon Salter	11 carries, 86 yards, TD
Colorado	Receiving	Omarion Miller	6 receptions, 88 yards, TD

=== UNLV ===
UNLV Rebels (4–0) at Wyoming Cowboys (2–2) – Game summary

Quarter	1	2	3	4	Total
Rebels	17	7	0	7	31
Cowboys	3	0	7	7	17

at War Memorial Stadium • Laramie, WY

- Date: October 4, 2025
- Game time: 5:00 p.m. MDT
- Game weather: Cloudy • Temperature: 41 °F (5 °C) • Wind: SW 20 mph
- Game attendance: 19,861
- Referee: Kenneth Ray
- TV announcers (CBSSN): Dave Ryan and Adam Breneman

Game information

First quarter

- (12:59) WYO – Erik Sandvik 36-yard field goal (Drive: 4 plays, 1 yard, 1:55; Wyoming 3–0)
- (9:18) UNLV – Keyvone Lee 6-yard run, Ramon Villela kick (Drive: 6 plays, 67 yards, 3:34; UNLV 7–3)
- (6:29) UNLV – Kayden McGee 16-yard punt return, Ramon Villela kick (UNLV 14–3)
- (1:36) UNLV – Ramon Villela 36-yard field goal (Drive: 9 plays, 17 yards, 3:13; UNLV 17–3)

Second quarter

- (0:59) UNLV – Jaden Bradley 13-yard punt return, Ramon Villela kick (UNLV 24–3)

Third quarter

- (12:46) WYO – Deion DeBlanc 12-yard run, Erik Sandvik kick (Drive: 5 plays, 75 yards, 2:14; UNLV 24–10)

Fourth quarter

- (6:20) UNLV – Jai'Den Thomas 8-yard pass from Anthony Colandrea, Ramon Villela kick (Drive: 10 plays, 69 yards, 5:31; UNLV 31–10)
- (1:55) WYO – Justin Erb 6-yard pass from Kaden Anderson, Erik Sandvik kick (Drive: 12 plays, 75 yards, 4:25; UNLV 31–17)

Statistics	UNLV	WYO
First downs	15	21
Plays–yards	59–255	72–356
Rushes–yards	39–153	26–102
Passing yards	102	254
Passing: Comp–Att–Int	11–20–0	25–46–1
Turnovers	1	3
Time of possession	30:22	29:38

Team	Category	Player	Statistics
UNLV	Passing	Anthony Colandrea	11/20, 102 yards, TD
UNLV	Rushing	Jai'Den Thomas	16 carries, 96 yards
UNLV	Receiving	Jaden Bradley	5 receptions, 65 yards
Wyoming	Passing	Kaden Anderson	25/46, 254 yards, TD, INT
Wyoming	Rushing	Sam Scott	11 carries, 49 yards
Wyoming	Receiving	Jaylen Sargent	4 receptions, 55 yards

=== San Jose State ===
San Jose State Spartans (2–3) at Wyoming Cowboys (2–3) – Game summary

Quarter	1	2	3	4	Total
Spartans	14	14	0	0	28
Cowboys	7	7	0	21	35

at War Memorial Stadium • Laramie, WY

- Date: October 11, 2025
- Game time: 5:00 p.m. MDT
- Game weather: Cloudy • Temperature: 56 °F (13 °C) • Wind: SW 10 mph
- Game attendance: 20,970
- Referee: Gray Reed
- TV announcers (CBSSN): Jordan Kent and Logan Ryan

Game information

First quarter

- (12:39) SJSU – Danny Scudero 43-yard pass from Walker Eget, Mathias Brown kick (Drive: 6 plays, 75 yards, 2:21; SJSU 7–0)
- (8:52) WYO – Deion DeBlanc 73-yard punt return, Erik Sandvik kick (Tied 7–7)
- (8:05) SJSU – Danny Scudero 72-yard pass from Walker Eget, Mathias Brown kick (Drive: 2 plays, 75 yards, 0:47; SJSU 14–7)

Second quarter

- (14:10) SJSU – Danny Scudero 7-yard pass from Walker Eget, Mathias Brown kick (Drive: 12 plays, 80 yards, 7:11; SJSU 21–7)
- (10:39) WYO – Michael Fitzgerald 35-yard pass from Kaden Anderson, Erik Sandvik kick (Drive: 7 plays, 75 yards, 3:31; SJSU 21–14)
- (10:19) SJSU – Danny Scudero 2-yard pass from Walker Eget, Mathias Brown kick (Drive: 1 play, 2yards, 0:04; SJSU 28–14)

Third quarter

- No scoring plays.

Fourth quarter

- (9:59) WYO – Brayden Johnson 65-yard interception, Erik Sandvik kick (SJSU 28–21)
- (2:44) WYO – Charlie Coenen 45-yard pass from Kaden Anderson, Erik Sandvik kick (Drive: 6 plays, 85 yards, 1:58; Tied 28–28)
- (0:40) WYO – Terron Kellman 28-yard run, Erik Sandvik kick (Drive: 4 plays, 80 yards, 0:33; Wyoming 35–28)

Statistics	SJSU	WYO
First downs	21	20
Plays–yards	84–383	65–413
Rushes–yards	28–43	25–109
Passing yards	340	304
Passing: Comp–Att–Int	31–56–1	23–40–2
Turnovers	2	3
Time of possession	34:54	25:06

Team	Category	Player	Statistics
San Jose State	Passing	Walker Eget	23/37, 295 yards, 4 TD
San Jose State	Rushing	Lamar Radcliffe	7 carries, 29 yards
San Jose State	Receiving	Danny Scudero	10 receptions, 180 yards, 4 TD
Wyoming	Passing	Kaden Anderson	23/39, 304 yards, 2 TD, 2 INT
Wyoming	Rushing	Samuel Harris	9 carries, 47 yards
Wyoming	Receiving	Samuel Harris	2 receptions, 58 yards

=== at Air Force ===
Wyoming Cowboys (3–3) at Air Force Falcons (1–5) – Game summary

Quarter	1	2	3	4	Total
Cowboys	7	0	7	7	21
Falcons	3	3	8	10	24

at Falcon Stadium • Air Force Academy, CO

- Date: October 18, 2025
- Game time: 1:30 p.m. MDT
- Game weather: Sunny • Temperature: 64 °F (18 °C) • Wind: NW 12 mph
- Game attendance: 23,401
- Referee: Brad Carrell
- TV announcers (CBSSN): Rich Waltz, Robert Turbin and Tiffany Blackmon

Game information

First quarter

- (5:52) AF – Reagan Tubbs 32-yard field goal (Drive: 16 plays, 60 yards, 9:08; Air Force 3–0)
- (1:29) WYO – Terron Kellman 23-yard run, Erik Sandvik kick (Drive: 9 plays, 74 yards, 4:18; Wyoming 7–3)

Second quarter

- (6:41) AF – Reagan Tubbs 29-yard field goal (Drive: 11 plays, 74 yards, 5:43; Wyoming 7–6)

Third quarter

- (10:27) WYO – Terron Kellman 23-yard run, Erik Sandvik kick (Drive: 10 plays, 75 yards, 4:33; Wyoming: 14–6)
- (6:39) AF – Liam Szarka 1-yard run, Kade Frew 2-point pass good (Drive: 8 plays, 60 yards, 3:40; Tied: 14–14)

Fourth quarter

- (5:28) AF – Kade Frew 9-yard run, Reagan Tubbs kick (Drive: 8 plays, 80 yards, 4:03; Air Force 21–14)
- (3:04) AF – Reagan Tubbs 40-yard field goal (Drive: 4 plays, 6 yards, 1:35; Air Force 24–14)
- (1:02) WYO – Michael Fitzgerald 13-yard pass from Kaden Anderson, Erik Sandvik kick (Drive: 9 plays, 68 yards, 1:55; Air Force 24–21)

Statistics	WYO	AFA
First downs	25	19
Plays–yards	66–409	64–363
Rushes–yards	36–198	56–330
Passing yards	211	33
Passing: Comp–Att–Int	23–30–2	3–8–0
Turnovers	2	0
Time of possession	26:57	33:03

Team	Category	Player	Statistics
Wyoming	Passing	Kaden Anderson	23/29, 211 yards, TD, INT
Wyoming	Rushing	Terron Kellman	9 carries, 83 yards, 2 TD
Wyoming	Receiving	Jaylen Sargent	5 receptions, 65 yards
Air Force	Passing	Liam Szarka	3/8, 33 yards
Air Force	Rushing	Liam Szarka	26 carries, 141 yards, TD
Air Force	Receiving	Jonah Dawson	1 reception, 18 yards

=== Colorado State (Border War) ===
Colorado State Rams (2–5) at Wyoming Cowboys (3–4) – Game summary

Quarter	1	2	3	4	Total
Rams	0	0	0	0	0
Cowboys	7	14	7	0	28

at War Memorial Stadium • Laramie, WY

- Date: October 25, 2025
- Game time: 5:30 p.m. MDT
- Game weather: Sunny • Temperature: 57 °F (14 °C) • Wind: SW 11 mph
- Game attendance: 25,609
- Referee: Patrick Foy
- TV announcers (CBSSN): Dave Ryan and Adam Breneman

Game information

First quarter

- (2:43) WYO – Landon Sims 1-yard run, Erik Sandvik kick (Drive: 12 plays, 67 yards, 6:45; Wyoming 7–0)

Second quarter

- (14:15) WYO – Michael Fitzgerald 22-yard pass from Kaden Anderson, Erik Sandvik kick (Drive: 6 plays, 49 yards, 2:37; Wyoming 14–0)
- (0:36) WYO – Chris Durr 9-yard pass from Kaden Anderson, Erik Sandvik kick (Drive: 5 plays, 56 yards, 2:39; Wyoming 21–0)

Third quarter

- (10:51) WYO – Sam Scott 37-yard run, Erik Sandvik kick (Drive: 6 plays, 78 yards, 2:54; Wyoming 28–0)

Fourth quarter

- No scoring plays.

Statistics	CSU	WYO
First downs	15	18
Plays–yards	61–305	59–372
Rushes–yards	27–94	34–212
Passing yards	211	160
Passing: Comp–Att–Int	19–34–3	17–25–0
Turnovers	3	0
Time of possession	28:11	31:49

Team	Category	Player	Statistics
Colorado State	Passing	Darius Curry	9/16, 112 yards
Colorado State	Rushing	Justin Marshall	6 carries, 33 yards
Colorado State	Receiving	Tay Lanier	3 receptions, 56 yards
Wyoming	Passing	Kaden Anderson	16/24, 154 yards, 2 TD
Wyoming	Rushing	Sam Scott	3 carries, 68 yards, TD
Wyoming	Receiving	Chris Durr	7 receptions, 67 yards, TD

=== at San Diego State ===
Wyoming Cowboys (4–4) at San Diego State Aztecs (6–1) – Game summary

Quarter	1	2	3	4	Total
Cowboys	7	0	0	0	7
Aztecs	7	10	0	7	24

at Snapdragon Stadium • San Diego, CA

- Date: November 1, 2025
- Game time: 4:00 p.m. PDT
- Game weather: Sunny • 73 °F (23 °C) • wind N 3 mph (4.8 km/h)
- Game attendance: 24,325
- Referee: Christian Watson
- TV announcers (CBSSN): John Sadak, Robert Turbin, and Jordan Giorgio

Game information

First quarter

- WYO (10:29) – Sam Scott 3-yard pass from Landon Sims (Erik Sandvik kick); Drive: 8 plays, 75 yards, 4:31 (Cowboys 7–0)
- SDSU (3:32) – Byron Cardwell Jr. 24-yard pass from Jayden Denegal (Gabriel Plascencia kick); Drive: 1 play, 24 yards, 0:10 (Tied 7–7)

Second quarter

- SDSU (10:52) – Gabriel Plascencia 34-yard field goal; Drive: 6 plays, 21 yards, 2:59 (Aztecs 10–7)
- SDSU (3:10) – Jordan Napier 7-yard run (Gabriel Plascencia kick); Drive: 6 plays, 67 yards, 3:10 (Aztecs 17–7)

Third quarter

- No scoring plays.

Fourth quarter

- SDSU (2:55) – Lucky Sutton 50-yard run (Gabriel Plascencia kick); Drive: 3 plays, 61 yards, 1:01 (Aztecs 24–7)

Statistics	WYO	SDSU
First downs	9	16
Plays–yards	62–185	62–390
Rushes–yards	35–89	40–196
Passing yards	96	194
Passing: Comp–Att–Int	13–27–3	11–22–2
Turnovers	4	2
Time of possession	29:33	30:27

Team	Category	Player	Statistics
Wyoming	Passing	Kaden Anderson	12/24, 93 yards, 3 INT
Wyoming	Rushing	Landon Sims	4 carries, 52 yards
Wyoming	Receiving	Michael Fitzgerald	3 receptions, 46 yards
San Diego State	Passing	Jayden Denegal	11/22, 194 yards, TD, 2 INT
San Diego State	Rushing	Lucky Sutton	28 carries, 158 yards, TD
San Diego State	Receiving	Donovan Brown	2 receptions, 51 yards

=== at Fresno State ===
Wyoming Cowboys (4–5) at Fresno State Bulldogs (6–3) – Game summary

Quarter	1	2	3	4	Total
Cowboys	3	0	0	0	3
Bulldogs	7	3	0	14	24

at Valley Children's Stadium • Fresno, CA

- Date: November 15, 2025
- Game time: 8:30 p.m. MDT
- Game weather: Rain
- Game attendance: 35,076
- Referee: Patrick Foy
- TV announcers (FS1): Trent Rush and Petros Papadakis

Game information

First quarter

- (9:34) FRES – Bryson Donelson 12-yard run, Dylan Lynch kick (Drive: 10 plays, 73 yards, 5:21; Fresno State 7–0)
- (6:39) WYO – Erik Sandvik 41-yard field goal (Drive: 8 plays, 52 yards, 2:55; Fresno State 7–3)

Second quarter

- (0:26) FRES – Dylan Lynch 40-yard field goal (Drive: 11 plays, 58 yards, 1:17; Fresno State 10–3)

Third quarter

- No scoring plays.

Fourth quarter

- (12:58) FRES – Johnathan Arceneaux 58-yard run, Dylan Lynch kick (Drive: 1 play, 58 yards, 0:11; Fresno State 17–3)
- (2:00) FRES – Josiah Freeman 13-yard pass from Carson Conklin, Dylan Lynch kick (Drive: 4 plays, 24 yards, 1:02; Fresno State 24–3)

Statistics	WYO	FRES
First downs	9	23
Plays–yards	60–184	74–311
Rushes–yards	32–107	47–216
Passing yards	77	95
Passing: Comp–Att–Int	8–28–1	12–27–0
Turnovers	1	0
Time of possession	25:55	34:05

Team	Category	Player	Statistics
Wyoming	Passing	Kaden Anderson	6/23, 64 yards, 1 INT
Wyoming	Rushing	Samuel Harris	12 carries, 102 yards
Wyoming	Receiving	Chris Durr	2 receptions, 37 yards
Fresno State	Passing	Carson Conklin	12/27, 95 yards, 1 TD
Fresno State	Rushing	Rayshon Luke	16 carries, 92 yards
Fresno State	Receiving	Josiah Freeman	2 receptions, 25 yards, 1 TD

=== Nevada ===
Nevada Wolf Pack (2–8) at Wyoming Cowboys (4–6) – Game summary

Quarter	1	2	3	4	Total
Wolf Pack	0	7	3	3	13
Cowboys	0	0	7	0	7

at War Memorial Stadium • Laramie, WY

- Date: November 22, 2025
- Game time: 12:00 p.m. MDT
- Game weather: Sunny • 46 °F (8 °C) • wind SW 8 mph (13 km/h)
- Game attendance: 25,650
- Referee: Nolan Dumas
- TV announcers (Altitude Sports): John Ramey (play-by-play) and Jared Petrino (analyst)

Game information

First quarter

- No scoring plays.

Second quarter

- (1:12) NEV – Jett Carpenter 8-yard pass from Carter Jones, Joe McFadden kick (Drive: 13 plays, 90 yards, 7:03; Nevada 7–0)

Third quarter

- (9:09) NEV – Joe McFadden 41-yard field goal (Drive: 7 plays, 60 yards, 4:12; Nevada 10–0)
- (1:27) WYO – Evan Svoboda 5-yard pass from Kaden Anderson, Erik Sandvik kick (Drive: 6 plays, 21 yards, 2:48; Nevada 10–7)

Fourth quarter

- (8:35) NEV – Joe McFadden 43-yard field goal (Drive: 12 plays, 49 yards, 7:52; Nevada 13–7)

Statistics	NEV	WYO
First downs	17	15
Plays–yards	58–271	64–220
Rushes–yards	40–213	23–68
Passing yards	58	152
Passing: Comp–Att–Int	11–18–0	23–41–0
Turnovers	1	0
Time of possession	34:50	25:10

Team	Category	Player	Statistics
Nevada	Passing	Carter Jones	11/17, 58 yards, TD
Nevada	Rushing	Caleb Ramseur	19 carries, 88 yards
Nevada	Receiving	Caleb Ramseur	1 reception, 21 yards
Wyoming	Passing	Kaden Anderson	22/39, 157 yards, TD
Wyoming	Rushing	Sam Scott	11 carries, 48 yards
Wyoming	Receiving	Michael Fitzgerald	4 receptions, 53 yards

=== at Hawaii (rivalry) ===
Wyoming Cowboys (4-7) at Hawaii Rainbow Warriors (7-4) – Game summary

Quarter	1	2	3	4	Total
Cowboys	7	0	0	0	7
Rainbow Warriors	7	13	7	0	27

at Clarence T.C. Ching Athletics Complex • Honolulu, HI

- Date: November 29, 2025
- Game time: 9:00 p.m.
- Game weather: Partly cloudy • Temperature: 80 °F (27 °C) • Wind: ENE at 2 miles per hour (3.2 km/h)
- Game attendance: 15,194
- Referee: Brad Carrell
- TV announcers (Spectrum Sports and MW App): Kanoa Leahey (play-by-play) and Rich Miano (analyst)

Game information

First quarter

- (8:58) WYO – Jones Thomas 50-yard interception return, Erik Sandvik kick (Wyoming 7–0)
- (3:52) HAW – Cam Barfield 19-yard pass from Micah Alejado, Kansei Matsuzawa kick (Drive: 10 plays, 75 yards, 5:06; Tied 7–7)

Second quarter

- (7:33) HAW – Kansei Matsuzawa 47-yard field goal (Drive: 5 plays, 14 yards, 2:13; Hawaii 10–7)
- (4:47) HAW – Jackson Harris 78-yard pass from Micah Alejado, Kansei Matsuzawa kick (Drive: 2 plays, 80 yards, 0:41; Hawaii 17–7)
- (2:28) HAW – Kansei Matsuzawa 47-yard field goal (Drive: 4 plays, 6 yards, 0:36; Hawaii 20–7)

Third quarter

- (11:36) HAW – Cam Barfield 41-yard run, Kansei Matsuzawa kick (Drive: 6 plays, 75 yards, 3:24; Hawaii 27–7)

Fourth quarter

- No scoring plays.

Statistics	WYO	HAW
First downs	16	14
Plays–yards	65–256	58–417
Rushes–yards	28–54	33–128
Passing yards	202	289
Passing: Comp–Att–Int	20–37–1	17–25–1
Turnovers	1	1
Time of possession	29:02	30:58

Team	Category	Player	Statistics
Wyoming	Passing	Mason Drube	17/32, 179 yards, INT
Wyoming	Rushing	Damashja Harris	5 carries, 17 yards
Wyoming	Receiving	Deion DeBlanc	4 receptions, 39 yards
Hawaii	Passing	Micah Alejado	17/24, 289 yards, 2 TD, INT
Hawaii	Rushing	Cam Barfield	15 carries, 77 yards, TD
Hawaii	Receiving	Jackson Harris	4 receptions, 153 yards, TD

== Personnel ==
=== Coaching staff ===
Name	Position	Consecutive Years
Jay Sawvel	Head coach	2nd
Jay Johnson	Offensive Coordinator/Quarterbacks	2nd
Aaron Bohl	Defensive Coordinator/Linebackers	9th
Benny Boyd	Co-Special Teams Coordinator/Cornerbacks	6th
Jovon Bouknight	Wide Receivers	1st
Deonte Gibson	Defensive Tackles	1st
Gary Harrell	Running Backs	1st
Brian Hendricks	Defensive Ends	3rd
Shannon Moore	Co-Special Teams Coordinator/Tight Ends/Fullbacks	7th
Jason Petrino	Safeties	1st
Joe Tripodi	Offensive Line	4th
Eric Donoval	Director of Sports Performance	8th

=== Roster ===
2025 Wyoming Cowboys Football
Quarterback: 7 Mason Drube – freshman (6'3" 218); 12 Kaden Anderson – sophomore (6'4" 230); 14 Landon Sims – sophomore (6'3" 210); 15 Gage Brook – sophomore (6'4" 237); Running Back: 4 Damashja Harris – graduate (6'4" 224); 5 Terron Kellman – junior (5'8" 210); 20 Jaden Lawrence – freshman (5'10" 185); 21 Nico Hamilton – (redshirt) freshman (5'10" 214); 22 Sam Scott – senior (6'2" 230); 24 Max White – graduate (5'10" 207); 26 Samuel "Tote" Harris – freshman (5'11" 170); 27 Dontae Burch – (redshirt) freshman (5'7" 189); 28 Patrick Broadway II – freshman (5'11" 200); 35 Nikos Varelas – sophomore (5'10" 193); Wide Receiver: 2 Eric Richardson – junior (5'11" 193); 3 Deion DeBlanc – freshman (5'10" 186); 6 Jaylan Bean – junior (6'4" 205); 8 Jaylen Sargent – senior (6'2" 186); 9 Jackson Holman – sophomore (6'3" 206); 11 Michael Fitzgerald – graduate (6'6" 210); 13 Chris Durr Jr. – sophomore (5'10" 173); 16 Ke'Lyn Washom – freshman (6'1" 195); 19 Charlie Coenen – junior (6'0" 194); 23 Tyler Nystrom – (redshirt) freshman (6'2" 195); 81 Pierre "PJ" Jackson – freshman (5'11" 160); 82 Bricen Brantley – sophomore (6'3" 181); 85 Clay Nanke – senior (6'6" 235); Tight End: 44 Tyler Hampton – senior (6'4" 250); 80 Justin Erb – senior (6'2" 245); 83 Kyle Frendt – freshman (6'5" 220); 84 John Michael Gyllenborg – senior (6'5" 250); 86 Evan Svoboda – senior (6'5" 250); 87 Isaac Schoenfeld – junior (6'5" 258); 88 Landon Pace – freshman (6'3" 240); 89 Jake Wilson – sophomore (6'5" 245)	Offensive Line: 50 Giovanni Panozzo – (redshirt) freshman (6'5" 301); 55 Kalvin Janssen – freshman (6'3" 290); 57 Luke Sandy – junior (6'2" 299); 60 Wyatt Walters – sophomore (6'4" 296); 62 Spencer Rathbun – (redshirt) freshman (6'4" 265); 63 Braylon Jenkins – (redshirt) freshman (6'4" 308); 64 Brandt Rice – sophomore (6'5" 300); 65 Nathan Gelger – sophomore (6'5" 295); 66 Johnathan Bush – freshman (6'2" 290); 70 Rex Johnson – junior (6'5" 307); 71 Jake Davies – sophomore (6'7" 295); 72 Caden Barnett – senior (6'5" 320); 73 Caleb Hall – (redshirt) freshman (6'5" 286); 74 Tariq Miller – freshman (6'3" 290); 75 Cooper Lawson – freshman (6'4" 260); 76 Quinn Grovesteen-Matchey – sophomore (6'6" 310); 77 Josiah Petaia – sophomore (6'3" 296); 78 Wes King – junior (6'5" 310); 79 Jack Walsh – senior (6'3" 315); Defensive Line: 5 Brayden Wilson – senior (6'5" 260); 11 Esaia Bogar – junior (6'2" 238); 18 Peter Eyabi – junior (6'2" 240); 39 Elltoum Murgus – (redshirt) freshman (6'3" 220); 40 Tyce Westland – senior (6'5" 245); 44 Axel Ramazani – freshman (6'2" 220); 47 Jason Handy – freshman (6'4" 220); 52 Chisom Ifeanyi – graduate (6'4" 250); 53 Tegen Seeds – (redshirt) freshman (6'0" 307); 55 Kevin Sjogren – (redshirt) sophomore (6'5" 245); 58 Jordan Turbull – sophomore (6'5" 249); 68 Cody Crawford – sophomore (6'1" 294); 78 Alex Haswell – (redshirt) freshman (6'5" 281); 80 Cade Brook – freshman (6'3" 230); 88 Tell Wade – sophomore (6'3" 245); 90 Aneesh Vyas – graduate (6'2" 305); 91 Gabriel Ikechukwu – freshman (6'2" 260); 92 Dante Drake – sophomore (6'3" 292); 94 Ben Florentine – senior (6'1" 280); 95 Caleb Robinson – graduate (6'2" 295); 96 Henry Rehberg – freshman (6'2" 255); 97 Lucas Samsula – (redshirt) sophomore (6'4" 305); 98 Jayden Williams – sophomore (6'3" 302); Place-Kickers: 47 Erik Sandvik – (redshirt) sophomore (6'1" 200); 99 Keelan Anderson – (redshirt) freshman (5'10" 168); Punters: 18 Bart Edmiston – junior (6'0" 200); 43 Gavyn Helm – (redshirt) freshman (6'3", 210); Long Snapper: 45 Charlie Houston – freshman (5'10" 195); 52 Carson York – senior (6'1" 219)	Linebacker: 6 Evan Eller – graduate (6'0" 230); 9 Brayden Johnson – senior (6'3" 245); 21 Enock Sibomana – senior (5'11" 206); 26 Gary Rutherford – (redshirt) freshman (6'1" 231); 33 Parker Moore – freshman (6'2" 225); 34 Steven Perez – freshman (6'1" 205); 41 Cooper Mailand – sophomore (6'2" 225); 42 Ethan Stuhlsatz – senior (6'4" 241); 46 Dash Bauman – (redshirt) freshman (6'2" 240); Defensive Back: 2 Caleb Merritt – junior (5'11" 193); 3 Andrew Johnson – senior (6'1" 202); 4 Justin Taylor – sophomore (6'0" 200); 7 Markle Grant – (redshirt) freshman (5'11" 176); 8 Tyrese Boss – (redshirt) freshman (5'11" 195); 12 Desman Hearns – junior (6'0" 194); 13 Ian Bell – junior (6'1" 194); 14 BJ Inmon – sophomore (5'11" 182); 15 David Leonard – (redshirt) freshman (5'11" 180); 16 Bleyne Bryant – (redshirt) freshman (6'1" 206); 19 Malique Singleton – junior (6'0" 193); 20 Dainsus Miller – senior (5'10" 180); 20 LaFai Purcell – sophomore (5'11" 182); 22 Jaden DaCosta – sophomore (6'0" 202); 23 Jones Thomas – sophomore (6'2" 202); 24 Drew Jackson – (redshirt) freshman (5'11" 182); 25 Brooklyn Cheek – (redshirt) freshman (6'1" 199); 27 Joaquin Sandoval – (redshirt) freshman (5'10" 186); 28 Kaiden Kimble-Turner – freshman (5'10" 185); 29 Isaac Sell – senior (5'10" 200); 30 Elvin Ampofo – freshman (6'0" 155); 31 Tyson Deen – freshman (5'10" 170); 32 Jevon Davis – senior (6'0" 209)

== Offseason ==
=== Departures ===
Name	Position	Notes
Abraham Bangoura	OL	Entered the Transfer Portal
Deyon Batiste	QB	Transferred to Incarnate Word
Jordan Bertagnole	DT	Medically Retired
Devin Boddie Jr.	WR	Entered the Transfer Portal
Alex Brown	WR	Graduated
Wrook Brown	CB	Transferred to Houston
Jayden Clemons	QB	Graduated
Caleb Cooley	WR	Graduated
Jack Culbreath	P	Graduated
Ethan Day	DE	Transferred to North Texas
Tyrecus Davis	CB	Transferred to Colorado
Cole DeMarzo	LB	Entered the Transfer Portal
Caleb Driskill	FB	Graduated
Wyett Ekeler	S	Graduated
Jamari Ferrell	RB	Entered the Transfer Portal
DeVonne Harris	DE	Graduated
Sabastian Harsh	DE	Transferred to NC State
Jack Harvey	LB	Entered the Transfer Portal
Naz Hill	CB	Transferred to Southern Illinois
John Hoyland	K	Graduated
DJ Jones	RB	Graduated
Hunter Kallstrom	TE	Transferred to North Dakota
TK King	WR	Transferred to New Mexico State
Kayden LaFramboise	WR	Entered the Transfer Portal
Brycen Lotz	OL	Entered the Transfer Portal
Kimball Madsen	FB	Graduated
Dawan Martin	DE	Entered the Transfer Portal
Koa McIntyre	SS	Transferred to Fort Hays State
Dawaiian McNeely	RB	Entered the Transfer Portal
Nick Miles	TE	Graduated
Trey Olsen	WR	Transferred to Northern Colorado
Adrian Onylego	LB	Transferred to Navarro College
Keany Parks	CB	Transferred to Houston
Will Pelissier	WR	Graduated
Connor Shay	LB	Graduated
Braden Siders	DE	Transferred to West Virginia
Shae Suiaunoa	LB	Graduated
Justin Stevenson	WR	Transferred to Utah
Read Sunn	LB	Transferred to Eastern Washington
Nic Talich	LB	Graduated
Miles Tucker	S	Transferred to College of San Mateo
Nofoafia Tulafono	C	Graduated
Harrison Waylee	RB	Transferred to Virginia
Isaac White	S	Graduated
Charles Williams	CB	Transferred to Georgetown
Jaden Williams	DT	Transferred to Kentucky
Micah Young	LB	Graduated

=== Additions ===
==== Incoming transfers ====
Player	Position	Eligibility Remaining	Previous school
Esaia Bogar	DE	2 years	Riverside Community College
Brooklyn Cheek	S	4 years	California
Jaden DaCosta	S	3 years	Portland State
Bart Edmiston	P	2 years	Jones College
Peter Eyabi	DE	2 years	Riverside Community College
Michael Fitzgerald	WR	1 year	Central Missouri
Damashja Harris	RB	2 years	North Texas
Desman Hearns	S	2 years	Southern Illinois
Jackson Holman	WR	3 years	Arizona
Chisom Ifeanyi	DE	1 year	Florida Atlantic
BJ Inmon	CB	3 years	Snow College
Brayden Johnson	LB	1 year	Oklahoma Baptist
Terron Kellman	RB	2 years	Charlotte
Dawan Martin	DE	1 year	Youngstown State
Dainsus Miller	CB	1 year	Mercer
Josiah Petaia	OL	3 years	Long Beach City College
Eric Richardson	WR	2 years	Northwest Missouri State
Enock Sibomana	LB	2 years	North Dakota State
Landon Sims	QB	3 years	East Central Community College
Ethan Stuhlsatz	LB	1 year	Lindenwood
Justin Taylor	S	3 years	Wisconsin
Aneesh Vyas	DT	1 year	Bucknell
Max White	RB	1 year	Iowa
Brayden Wilson	DE	1 year	Weber State

==== Recruiting ====
Wyoming signed a high school class of 24 scholarship athletes.

===== Scholarship recruits =====
College recruiting
Name	Hometown	School	Height	Weight	Commit date
Elvin Ampofo; S	Aurora, CO	Eaglecrest HS	6 ft 0 in (1.83 m)	155 lb (70 kg)	Dec 4, 2024
Elvin Ampofo; S	Recruit ratings: Rivals: 247Sports: ESPN:				
Patrick Broadway II; RB	Houston, TX	Fulshear HS	5 ft 11 in (1.80 m)	200 lb (91 kg)	Feb 5, 2025
Patrick Broadway II; RB	Recruit ratings: Rivals: 247Sports: ESPN:				
Cade Brook; DE	Aurora, CO	Cherokee Trail HS	6 ft 3 in (1.91 m)	225 lb (102 kg)	Dec 2, 2024
Cade Brook; DE	Recruit ratings: Rivals: 247Sports: ESPN:				
Johnathan Bush; OL	Whitehouse, TX	Whitehouse HS	6 ft 2 in (1.88 m)	290 lb (130 kg)	Dec 4, 2024
Johnathan Bush; OL	Recruit ratings: Rivals: 247Sports: ESPN:				
Deion DeBlanc; WR	Houston, TX	North Shore HS	5 ft 10 in (1.78 m)	180 lb (82 kg)	Nov 26, 2024
Deion DeBlanc; WR	Recruit ratings: Rivals: 247Sports: ESPN:				
Tyson Deen; CB	San Antonio, TX	Southwest HS	5 ft 10 in (1.78 m)	165 lb (75 kg)	Dec 4, 2024
Tyson Deen; CB	Recruit ratings: Rivals: 247Sports: ESPN:				
Mason Drube; QB	Gillette, WY	Campbell County HS	6 ft 3 in (1.91 m)	205 lb (93 kg)	Jun 13, 2024
Mason Drube; QB	Recruit ratings: Rivals: 247Sports: ESPN:				
Kyle Frendt; TE	Woodbury, MN	East Ridge HS	6 ft 4 in (1.93 m)	220 lb (100 kg)	Jun 13, 2024
Kyle Frendt; TE	Recruit ratings: Rivals: 247Sports: ESPN:				
Jason Handy; DE	Cedar Park, TX	Vista Ridge HS	6 ft 4 in (1.93 m)	215 lb (98 kg)	Feb 5, 2025
Jason Handy; DE	Recruit ratings: Rivals: 247Sports: ESPN:				
Samuel Harris; RB	Cibolo, TX	Byron P. Steele HS	5 ft 11 in (1.80 m)	180 lb (82 kg)	Dec 4, 2024
Samuel Harris; RB	Recruit ratings: Rivals: 247Sports: ESPN:				
Charlie Houston; LS	Rowlett, TX	Garland HS	5 ft 10 in (1.78 m)	195 lb (88 kg)	Feb 5, 2025
Charlie Houston; LS	Recruit ratings: Rivals: 247Sports: ESPN:				
Gabriel Ikechukwu; DT	Houston, TX	Cypress Ranch HS	6 ft 2 in (1.88 m)	260 lb (120 kg)	Feb 5, 2025
Gabriel Ikechukwu; DT	Recruit ratings: Rivals: 247Sports: ESPN:				
Pierre Jackson; WR	Chicago, IL	Morgan Park HS	5 ft 11 in (1.80 m)	160 lb (73 kg)	Dec 4, 2024
Pierre Jackson; WR	Recruit ratings: Rivals: 247Sports: ESPN:				
Kalvin Janssen; OL	Gretna, NE	Gretna HS	6 ft 3 in (1.91 m)	290 lb (130 kg)	Dec 4, 2024
Kalvin Janssen; OL	Recruit ratings: Rivals: 247Sports: ESPN:				
Kaiden Kimble-Turner; S	Kuna, ID	Rocky Mountain HS	5 ft 10 in (1.78 m)	185 lb (84 kg)	Sep 27, 2024
Kaiden Kimble-Turner; S	Recruit ratings: Rivals: 247Sports: ESPN:				
Jaden Lawrence; RB	Parker, CO	Legend HS	5 ft 10 in (1.78 m)	185 lb (84 kg)	Aug 11, 2024
Jaden Lawrence; RB	Recruit ratings: Rivals: 247Sports: ESPN:				
Cooper Lawson; OL	Afton, WY	Star Valley HS	6 ft 3 in (1.91 m)	260 lb (120 kg)	Dec 4, 2024
Cooper Lawson; OL	Recruit ratings: Rivals: 247Sports: ESPN:				
Tariq Miller; OL	Leon, IA	Central Decatur HS	6 ft 3 in (1.91 m)	290 lb (130 kg)	Jun 28, 2024
Tariq Miller; OL	Recruit ratings: Rivals: 247Sports: ESPN:				
Parker Moore; LB	Lawrence, KS	Lawrence Free State HS	6 ft 2 in (1.88 m)	225 lb (102 kg)	Jul 27, 2024
Parker Moore; LB	Recruit ratings: Rivals: 247Sports: ESPN:				
Landon Pace; TE	St. Louis, MO	St. Louis University HS	6 ft 3 in (1.91 m)	240 lb (110 kg)	Dec 4, 2024
Landon Pace; TE	Recruit ratings: Rivals: 247Sports: ESPN:				
Steven Perez; LB	Wilmington, CA	Phineas Banning HS	6 ft 1 in (1.85 m)	205 lb (93 kg)	Dec 4, 2024
Steven Perez; LB	Recruit ratings: Rivals: 247Sports: ESPN:				
Axel Ramazani; DE	Des Moines, IA	Urbandale HS	6 ft 2 in (1.88 m)	225 lb (102 kg)	Aug 15, 2024
Axel Ramazani; DE	Recruit ratings: Rivals: 247Sports: ESPN:				
Henry Rehberg; DT	Omaha, NE	Millard North HS	6 ft 2 in (1.88 m)	255 lb (116 kg)	Jul 1, 2024
Henry Rehberg; DT	Recruit ratings: Rivals: 247Sports: ESPN:				
Ke'Lyn Washom; WR	Houston, TX	Nimitz HS	6 ft 1 in (1.85 m)	195 lb (88 kg)	Dec 4, 2024
Ke'Lyn Washom; WR	Recruit ratings: Rivals: 247Sports: ESPN:				
Overall recruit ranking: Rivals: N/A 247Sports: 90 ESPN: N/A
Note: In many cases, Scout, Rivals, 247Sports, On3, and ESPN may conflict in their listings of height and weight.; In these cases, the average was taken. ESPN grades are on a 100-point scale.; Sources: "Rivals commits". Rivals.; "ESPN commits". ESPN.; "2025 Team Ranking". Rivals.com.; "247Sports commits". 247Sports.
