= Dick Miller (American football) =

American football player and coach (1917–1994)

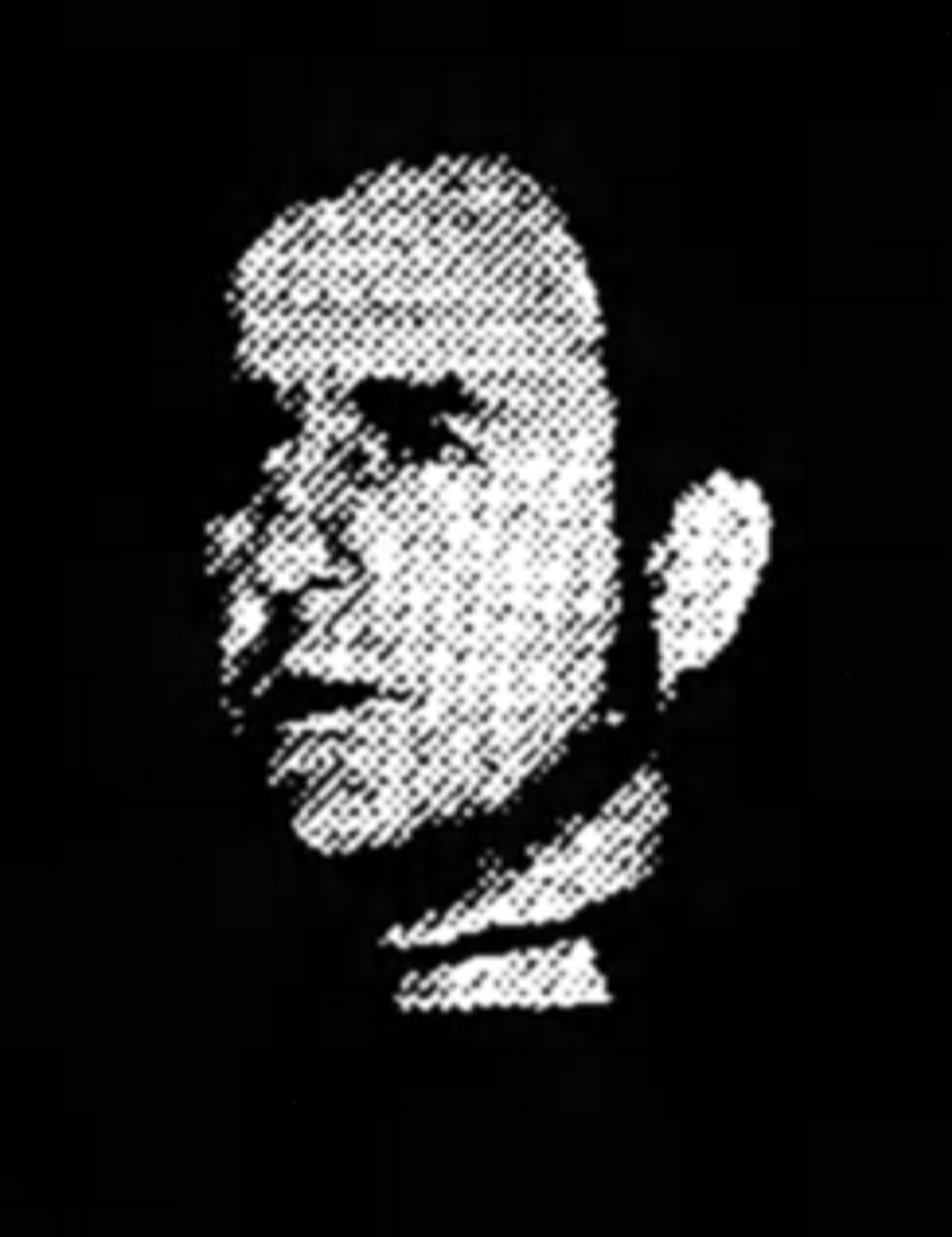

Biographical details
- Born: December 30, 1917; Canton, Ohio, U.S.
- Died: February 6, 1994 (aged 76); Louisville, Ohio, U.S.

Playing career
- 1934–1935: Canton McKinley HS (OH)
- 1937–1938: Akron
- 1940: Nevada

Coaching career (HC unless noted)
- 1939: Nevada (end)
- 1942–1945: Lincoln HS (OH) (assistant)
- 1946: Nevada (end)
- 1947–1948: Oregon (line)
- 1949: North Dakota
- 1950–1952: Canton McKinley HS (OH)

Head coaching record
- Overall: 4–3–1 (college); 15–14-1 (high school)

Richard King Miller (December 30, 1917 – February 6, 1994) was an American football player and coach.

== Football career ==
Miller was a member of coach Jim Aiken's 1934 Ohio high school state champion team at Canton McKinley High School. Aiken was hired as the University of Akron's head coach in 1936, and Miller followed him there a year later, playing from the school in 1937 and 1938. He holds Akron records for most interceptions in a season (13 in 1937) and in a game (6 vs. Baldwin Wallace in 1937). When Akron coach Jim Aiken was hired as head coach at the University of Nevada in 1939, he brought Miller with him. He sat out the 1939 season in order to become eligible to play, and served as Aiken's end coach. Miller starred as an end on the 1940 Nevada team, with Aiken deeming him "the greatest end I've ever coached." Aiken hired Miller as his end coach in May 1946 after he had been an assistant coach for Lincoln High School in Canton, Ohio. When Aiken was hired as head coach at the University of Oregon in January 1947, he chose to bring Miller with him from Nevada to be line coach. In 1948, the athletic director from the University of North Dakota visited a coaching school in Oregon, and Miller was hired as the head football coach at the University of North Dakota in February 1949. He brought with him Frank Zazula, Oregon backfield coach as his assistant. He compiled a record of 4–3–1 before resigning in April 1950 to coach Canton McKinley High School in Ohio. Aiken offered Miller an assistant position at the University of Oregon in 1951, but Miller declined the offer. Miller's contract was not renewed after three seasons, compiling a 15-14-1 record while failing to defeat rival Massillon.

== Personal life ==
Miller served as a Chief Petty Officer in the U.S. Navy during World War II.

Following his departure from Canton McKinley, Miller became a teacher at Timken High School.

== Head coaching record ==
=== College ===
Year	Team	Overall	Conference	Standing	Bowl/playoffs
North Dakota Fighting Sioux (North Central Conference) (1949)
1949	North Dakota	4–3–1	3–2–1	T–3rd	
North Dakota:		4–3–1	3–2–1		
Total:		4–3–1			
