= 2025 Akron Zips football team =

American college football season

2025 Akron Zips football
- Conference: Mid-American Conference
- Record: 5–7 (4–4 MAC)
- Head coach: Joe Moorhead (4th season)
- Offensive scheme: Up-tempo spread
- Defensive coordinator: Tim Tibesar (4th season)
- Base defense: Multiple 4–2–5
- Home stadium: InfoCision Stadium–Summa Field

2025 Mid-American Conference football standings
	Conf.			Overall
Team	W		L	W		L
Western Michigan y$	7	–	1	10	–	4
Miami (OH) y	6	–	2	7	–	7
Ohio	6	–	2	9	–	4
Toledo	6	–	2	8	–	5
Central Michigan	5	–	3	7	–	6
Akron*	4	–	4	5	–	7
Buffalo	4	–	4	5	–	7
Kent State	4	–	4	5	–	7
Eastern Michigan	3	–	5	4	–	8
Ball State	3	–	5	4	–	8
Bowling Green	2	–	6	4	–	8
Northern Illinois	2	–	6	3	–	9
UMass	0	–	8	0	–	12
Championship: Western Michigan 23, Miami (OH) 13
$ – Conference champion; y – Championship game participant; * Ineligible for postseason play due to low APR score

The 2025 Akron Zips football team represented the University of Akron in the Mid-American Conference (MAC) during the 2025 NCAA Division I FBS football season. The Zips were led by Joe Moorhead in his fourth year as the head coach. The Zips played their home games at InfoCision Stadium, located in Akron, Ohio.

Akron was ineligible for postseason play regardless of their final record due to an insufficient Academic Progress Rate, becoming the first FBS team to become ineligible for postseason play due to APR since the 2014 Idaho Vandals.

== Offseason ==
=== Transfers ===
==== Outgoing ====
Player	Position	Destination
Jarvis Rush	WR	Alcorn State
Marcus Moore Jr.	DL	Bowling Green
Davion Jennings	DB	Central Connecticut State
Tahj Bullock	QB	Colorado State
Charles Kellom	RB	Eastern Illinois
Garrison Smith	K	Florida Atlantic
Tyhler Williams	OL	Georgia State
Bobby Golden	WR	Louisville
Adrian Norton	WR	Marshall
Jayvin James	OL	Maryland
Joey Hunter	DB	Memphis
Jerrod Burrell	OL	Morgan State
Bryan McCoy	LB	Oklahoma State
Jordon Simmons	RB	Ole Miss
CJ Nunnally IV	DE	Purdue
Antavious Fish	LB	Sam Houston
Phaizon Wilson	WR	UT Martin
Devonte Golden-Nelson	DB	West Virginia
Darrian Lewis	CB	West Virginia
Laurance Seymore	OL	Western Kentucky
Grant Gainer	TE	North Texas
Noel Roach	S	Robert Morris
Silas Proby	CB	Houston Christian
Brian Kilbane Jr.	OL	Unknown
Darius Owens	S	Unknown
Eli Fields	OL	Unknown
Andre Proffitt	DL	Unknown
Michael Snowden	LB	Unknown
Ahmarian Granger	WR	Unknown
Roosevelt Mitchell	IOL	Unknown
Isaiah Jones	WR	Unknown

==== Incoming ====
Player	Position	Previous school
Cyrus Durham	DE	Arizona
Chris Gee	RB	Colgate
Amarie Archer	OL	East Carolina
Tim Grear	WR	Fresno State
Jamari Somerville	DB	James Madison
Alex Branch	S	Kent State
Maasai King	OL	Lackawanna
Taven Curry	RB	Louisiana–Monroe
DJ Stepney	S	Marshall
Marcel Williams	WR	Marshall
Jayme Simmons	OT	North Alabama
Adam Samaha	K	North Carolina
Mehki Flowers	S	Penn State
Cameron Monteiro	WR	Pittsburgh
Michael Johnson Jr.	QB	Syracuse
Jordan Gant	RB	Tennessee State
Ben Kamara	CB	Upper Iowa
Cam Hollobaugh	LB	Walsh
Brandon Hills	WR	Washington State
Allen Jones Jr.	IOL	West Alabama
Darrell Johnson Jr.	OL	Western Kentucky

== Preseason ==
The MAC Football Kickoff was held on Thursday, July 24, 2025 at the Ford Field in Detroit, Michigan from 9:00 am EDT to 1:30 pm EDT.

=== Preseason polls ===
==== Coaches Poll ====
On July 24 the MAC announced the preseason coaches' poll.

MAC Coaches poll
Predicted finish	Team	Votes (1st place)
1	Toledo	135 (7)
2	Miami	131 (3)
3	Ohio	123 (3)
4	Buffalo	115
5	Northern Illinois	94
6	Bowling Green	81
7	Western Michigan	71
8	Eastern Michigan	68
9	Central Michigan	65
10	Ball State	41
T11	Akron	39
T11	Massachusetts	39
13	Kent State	12

Coaches poll (MAC Championship)
Predicted finish	Team	Votes
1	Toledo	6
2	Miami	4
3	Ohio	3

== Schedule ==
Date	Time	Opponent	Site	TV	Result	Attendance
August 28	7:00 p.m.	Wyoming*	InfoCision Stadium–Summa Field; Akron, OH	ESPN+	L 0–10	9,138
September 6	7:30 p.m.	at Nebraska*	Memorial Stadium; Lincoln, NE	BTN	L 0–68	86,439
September 13	8:30 p.m.	at UAB*	Protective Stadium; Birmingham, AL	ESPN+	L 28–31	17,823
September 20	6:00 p.m.	Duquesne*	InfoCision Stadium–Summa Field; Akron, OH	ESPN+	W 51–7	8,117
September 27	3:30 p.m.	at Toledo	Glass Bowl; Toledo, OH	ESPN+	L 3–45	24,535
October 4	3:30 p.m.	Central Michigan	InfoCision Stadium–Summa Field; Akron, OH	ESPN+	W 28–22	8,995
October 11	12:00 p.m.	Miami (OH)	InfoCision Stadium–Summa Field; Akron, OH	ESPN+	L 7–20	6,575
October 18	3:30 p.m.	at Ball State	Scheumann Stadium; Muncie, IN	ESPN+	L 28–42	12,248
October 25	1:00 p.m.	at Buffalo	University at Buffalo Stadium; Amherst, NY	ESPN+	W 24–16	12,491
November 4	7:00 p.m.	UMass	InfoCision Stadium–Summa Field; Akron, OH	CBSSN	W 44–10	5,046
November 11	7:30 p.m.	Kent State	InfoCision Stadium–Summa Field; Akron, OH (Wagon Wheel)	ESPNU	L 35–42 ^{OT}	8,501
November 18	7:00 p.m.	at Bowling Green	Doyt Perry Stadium; Bowling Green, OH	ESPNU	W 19–16	9,867
*Non-conference game; All times are in Eastern time

== Game summaries ==
=== Wyoming ===
Wyoming Cowboys (0–0) at Akron Zips (0–0) – Game summary

Quarter	1	2	3	4	Total
Cowboys	0	3	0	7	10
Zips	0	0	0	0	0

at InfoCision Stadium–Summa Field • Akron, Ohio

- Date: August 28
- Game time: 7:00 PM EDT
- Game weather: Sunny
- Game attendance: 9,138
- Referee: Matt Packowski
- TV announcers (ESPN+): Michael Reghi (play-by-play) and Ryan Cavanaugh (analyst)

Game information

First quarter

- No scoring plays.

Second quarter

- WYO – Erik Sandvik 25-yard field goal, 5:20. Cowboys 3–0. Drive: 6 plays, 54 yards, 2:22.

Third quarter

- No scoring plays.

Fourth quarter

- WYO – Chris Durr 35-yard pass from Kaden Anderson (Erik Sandvik kick), 4:21 Cowboys 10–0. Drive: 4 plays, 85 yards, 1:49.

Statistics	WYO	AKR
First downs	19	13
Plays–yards	75–426	66–228
Rushes–yards	39–166	28–89
Passing yards	260	139
Passing: Comp–Att–Int	19–36–1	16–38–1
Turnovers	1	1
Time of possession	33:16	26:44

Team	Category	Player	Statistics
Wyoming	Passing	Kaden Anderson	19/36, 260 yards, TD, INT
Wyoming	Rushing	Sam Scott	29 carries, 132 yards
Wyoming	Receiving	Chris Durr	8 receptions, 190 yards, TD
Wyoming	Defense	Brayden Jackson	8 tackles, INT, PBU, QB hurry
Akron	Passing	Ben Finley	16/38, 139 yards, INT
Akron	Rushing	Marquise Williams	6 carries, 30 yards
Akron	Receiving	Sean Patrick	4 receptions, 47 yards
Akron	Defense	Shammond Cooper	10 tackles, 0.5 TFL

=== at Nebraska ===
Akron Zips (0–1) at Nebraska Cornhuskers (1–0) – Game summary

Quarter	1	2	3	4	Total
Zips	0	0	0	0	0
Cornhuskers	9	24	21	14	68

at Memorial Stadium • Lincoln, Nebraska

- Date: September 6
- Game time: 6:30 PM CDT
- Game weather: Clear • Temperature: 65 °F (18 °C) • Wind: NW at 6 miles per hour (9.7 km/h)
- Game attendance: 86,439
- Referee: Chris Coyte
- TV announcers (BTN): Mark Followill (play-by-play), Anthony Herron (analyst) and Dannie Rogers (sideline)

Game information

First Quarter

- (12:17) NEB – Emmett Johnson 47-yard run, Kyle Cunanan kick (Drive: 7 plays, 77 yards, 2:39, Nebraska 7-0)
- (4:44) NEB – Kade Pietrzak safety (Drive: 1 play, 1:25, Nebraska 9-0)

Second Quarter

- (13:56) NEB – Kyle Cunanan 35-yard field goal (Drive: 4 plays, 4 yards, 0:50, Nebraska 12-0)
- (8:17) NEB – Emmett Johnson 4-yard pass from Dylan Raiola, Kyle Cunanan kick (Drive: 8 plays, 59 yards, 3:44, Nebraska 19-0)
- (2:08) NEB – Quinn Clark 37-yard pass from Dylan Raiola, Kyle Cunanan kick (Drive: 7 plays, 89 yards, 3:38, Nebraska 26-0)
- (0:46) NEB – Luke Lindenmeyer 10-yard pass from Dylan Raiola, Kyle Cunanan kick (Drive: 3 plays, 31 yards, 0:55, Nebraska 33-0)

Third Quarter

- (10:49) NEB – Emmett Johnson 6-yard run, Kyle Cunanan kick (Drive: 6 plays, 52 yards, 1:25, Nebraska 40-0)
- (5:58) NEB – Dane Key 12-yard pass from Dylan Raiola, Kyle Cunanan kick (Drive: 4 plays, 78 yards, 1:30, Nebraska 47-0)
- (2:37) NEB – Kwinten Ives 28-yard run, Kyle Cunanan kick (Drive: 5 plays, 74 yards, 2:21, Nebraska 54-0)
- Fourth Quarter
- (13:01) NEB – Mekhi Nelson 1-yard run, Kyle Cunanan kick (Drive: 5 plays, 51 yards, 1:55, Nebraska 61-0)
- (7:31) NEB – TJ Lateef 8-yard run, Kyle Cunanan kick (Drive: 4 plays, 43 yards, 1:59, Nebraska 68-0)

Statistics	AKR	NEB
First downs	13	30
Plays–yards	59–175	73–728
Rushes–yards	36–113	33–234
Passing yards	62	494
Passing: Comp–Att–Int	9–23–0	32–40–0
Turnovers	1	1
Time of possession	29:50	30:10

Team	Category	Player	Statistics
Akron	Passing	Ben Finley	7/21, 54 yards
Akron	Rushing	Sean Patrick	12 carries, 64 yards
Akron	Receiving	Marcel Williams	2 receptions, 28 yards
Nebraska	Passing	Dylan Raiola	24/31, 364 yards, 4 TD
Nebraska	Rushing	Emmett Johnson	14 carries, 140 yards, 2 TD
Nebraska	Receiving	Jacory Barney Jr.	7 receptions, 132 yards

=== at UAB ===
Akron Zips (0–2) at UAB Blazers (1–1) – Game summary

Quarter	1	2	3	4	Total
Zips	17	3	0	8	28
Blazers	14	17	0	0	31

at Protective Stadium • Birmingham, Alabama

- Date: September 13
- Game time: 7:30 PM CDT
- Game weather: Sunny • Temperature: 81 °F (27 °C) • Wind: E at 4 miles per hour (6.4 km/h)
- Game attendance: 17,823
- Referee: Marcel Kerr
- TV announcers (ESPN+): Kevin Fitzgerald (play-by-play) and Tyoka Jackson (analyst)

Game information

First quarter

- (14:49) UAB – Solomon Beebe 96-yard kickoff return, Jonah Delange kick (UAB 7–0)
- (14:38) AKR – Israel Polk 75-yard pass from Ben Finley, Owen Wiley kick (Drive: 1 play, 75 yards, 0:11; Tied 7–7)
- (8:36) AKR – Israel Polk 5-yard pass from Ben Finley, Owen Wiley kick (Drive: 9 plays, 55 yards, 2:55; Akron 14–7)
- (4:21) UAB – Nate Rogers 8-yard run, Jonah Delange kick (Drive: 9 plays, 65 yards, 2:08; Tied 14–14)
- (1:26) AKR – Owen Wiley 36-yard field goal (Drive: 10 plays, 56 yards, 2:55; Akron 17–14)

Second quarter

- (14:24) UAB – Jonah Delange 44-yard field goal (Drive: 9 plays, 39 yards, 2:02; Tied 17–17)
- (8:48) UAB – Jevon Jackson 6-yard pass from Jalen Kitna, Jonah Delange kick (Drive: 7 plays, 96 yards, 3:02; UAB 24–17)
- (1:53) AKR – Owen Wiley 23-yard field goal (Drive: 6 plays, 25 yards, 2:06; UAB 24–20)
- (0:47) UAB – Corri Milliner 5-yard pass from Jalen Kitna, Jonah Delange kick (Drive: 8 plays, 62 yards, 1:00; UAB 31–20)

Third quarter

- No scoring plays

Fourth quarter

- (12:38) AKR – Sean Patrick 1-yard run, Ben Finley run (Drive: 12 plays, 83 yards, 5:01; UAB 31–28)

Statistics	AKR	UAB
First downs	21	26
Plays–yards	78–441	76–421
Rushes–yards	43–159	32–80
Passing yards	282	341
Passing: comp–att–int	19–35–0	30–44–0
Turnovers	0	1
Time of possession	29:58	30:02

Team	Category	Player	Statistics
Akron	Passing	Ben Finley	19/35, 282 yards, 2 TD
Akron	Rushing	Sean Patrick	19 carries, 81 yards, TD
Akron	Receiving	Israel Polk	4 receptions, 99 yards, 2 TD
UAB	Passing	Jalen Kitna	30/44, 341 yards, 2 TD
UAB	Rushing	Jevon Jackson	14 carries, 45 yards
UAB	Receiving	Iverson Hooks	5 receptions, 84 yards

=== Duquesne (FCS) ===
Duquesne Dukes (FCS) (1–2) at Akron Zips (0–3) – Game summary

Quarter	1	2	3	4	Total
Dukes (FCS)	0	0	7	0	7
Zips	10	28	7	6	51

at InfoCision Stadium–Summa Field • Akron, Ohio

- Date: September 20
- Game time: 6:00 p.m. EDT
- Game weather: Sunny
- Game attendance: 8,117
- Referee: Billy Williams
- TV announcers (ESPN+): Anthony Lima (play-by-play) and Craig Haubert (analyst)

Game information

First quarter

- AKR – Jordan Gant 17-yard run (Owen Wiley kick), 8:02. Zips 7–0. Drive: 1 play, 17 yards, 0:07.
- AKR – Owen Wiley 27-yard field goal, 0:41. Zips 10–0. Drive: 8 plays, 50 yards, 2:30.

Second quarter

- AKR – Kyan Mason 20-yard pass from Ben Finley (Owen Wiley kick), 12:11. Zips 17–0. Drive: 4 plays, 56 yards, 1:11.
- AKR – Malcolm DeWalt IV 22-yard interception return (Owen Wiley kick), 11:18. Zips 24–0.
- AKR – Jordan Gant 9-yard run (Owen Wiley kick), 8:34. Zips 31–0. Drive: 4 plays, 53 yards, 1:08.
- AKR – Jordan Gant 8-yard run (Owen Wiley kick), 0:24. Zips 38–0. Drive: 7 plays, 60 yards, 1:49.

Third quarter

- AKR – Tim Grear Jr. 15-yard pass from Ben Finley (Matthew Schramm kick), 7:05. Zips 45–0. Drive: 6 plays, 96 yards, 3:03.
- DUQ – Logan Kushner 1-yard run (Matt Marcinko kick), 5:20. Zips 45–7. Drive: 4 plays, 75 yards, 1:45.

Fourth quarter

- AKR – Matthew Schramm 23-yard field goal, 13:13. Zips 48–7. Drive: 9 plays, 33 yards, 3:19.
- AKR – Matthew Schramm 41-yard field goal, 5:07. Zips 51–7. Drive: 10 plays, 47 yards, 5:11.

Statistics	DUQ	AKR
First downs	12	26
Plays–yards	65–230	67–514
Rushes–yards	40–178	35–265
Passing yards	52	249
Passing: Comp–Att–Int	9–25–2	16–32–1
Turnovers	3	1
Time of possession	33:18	26:42

Team	Category	Player	Statistics
Duquesne	Passing	Tyler Riddell	8/21, 52 yards, 2 INT
Duquesne	Rushing	Ness Davis	11 carries, 102 yards
Duquesne	Receiving	Jermaine Johnson	2 receptions, 17 yards
Akron	Passing	Ben Finley	13/23, 219 yards, 2 TD, INT
Akron	Rushing	Jordan Gant	13 carries, 161 yards, 3 TD
Akron	Receiving	Myles Walker	5 receptions, 65 yards

=== at Toledo ===
Akron Zips (1–3) at Toledo Rockets (2–2) – Game summary

Quarter	1	2	3	4	Total
Zips	0	3	0	0	3
Rockets	14	21	3	7	45

at Glass Bowl • Toledo, Ohio

- Date: September 27
- Game time: 3:30 p.m. EDT
- Game weather: Sunny, 84 degrees
- Game attendance: 24,535
- Referee: Rick Warne
- TV announcers (ESPN+): Michael Reghi (play-by-play) and Ryan Cavanaugh (analyst)

Game information

First quarter

- TOL – Junior Vandeross III 28-yard pass from Tucker Gleason (Dylan Cunanan kick), 14:44. Rockets 7–0. Drive: 1 play, 28 yards, 0:07.
- TOL – Chip Trayanum 11-yard run (Dylan Cunanan kick), 9:59. Rockets 14–0. Drive: 7 plays, 76 yards, 3:33.

Second quarter

- TOL – Tucker Gleason 2-yard run (Dylan Cunanan kick), 13:41. Rockets 21–0. Drive: 10 plays, 75 yards, 5:01.
- TOL – Junior Vandeross III 26-yard pass from Tucker Gleason (Dylan Cunanan kick), 10:27. Rockets 28–0. Drive: 3 plays, 50 yards, 1:18.
- AKR – Owen Wiley 39-yard field goal, 1:56. Rockets 28–3. Drive: 18 plays, 54 yards, 8:31.
- TOL – Eric Holley III 26-yard pass from Tucker Gleason (Dylan Cunanan kick), 0:23. Rockets 35–3. Drive: 4 plays, 72 yards, 1:29.

Third quarter

- TOL – Dylan Cunanan 40-yard field goal, 0:12. Rockets 38–3. Drive: 5 plays, 42 yards, 2:06.

Fourth quarter

- TOL – Kalieb Osborne 21-yard run (Dylan Cunanan kick), 12:48. Rockets 45–3. Drive: 4 plays, 45 yards, 1:55.

Statistics	AKR	TOL
First downs	11	28
Plays–yards	60–134	57–538
Rushes–yards	35–55	37–245
Passing yards	79	293
Passing: Comp–Att–Int	14–25–0	20–24–0
Turnovers	1	0
Time of possession	28:53	31:07

Team	Category	Player	Statistics
Akron	Passing	Brayden Roggow	7/12, 51 yards
Akron	Rushing	Jordan Gant	13 carries, 22 yards
Akron	Receiving	Israel Polk	2 receptions, 16 yards
Toledo	Passing	Tucker Gleason	16/19, 237 yards, 3 TD
Toledo	Rushing	Chip Trayanum	11 carries, 75 yards, TD
Toledo	Receiving	Junior Vandeross III	9 receptions, 122 yards, 2 TD

=== Central Michigan ===
Central Michigan Chippewas (3–2) at Akron Zips (1–4) – Game summary

Quarter	1	2	3	4	Total
Chippewas	3	7	3	9	22
Zips	0	14	14	0	28

at InfoCision Stadium–Summa Field • Akron, Ohio

- Date: October 4
- Game time: 3:30 p.m. EDT
- Game weather: Sunny
- Game attendance: 8,995
- Referee: Billy Williams
- TV announcers (ESPN+): Michael Reghi (play-by-play) and Ryan Cavanaugh (analyst)

Game information

First quarter

- (5:46) CMU – Cade Graham 46-yard field goal (Drive: 8 plays, 64 yards, 4:45; Central Michigan 3–0)

Second quarter

- (12:15) AKR – Kyan Mason 22-yard pass from Ben Finley, Owen Wiley kick (Drive: 6 plays, 80 yards, 2:23; Akron 7–3)
- (8:34) CMU – Angel Flores 28-yard run, Cade Graham kick (Drive: 7 plays, 77 yards, 1:30; Central Michigan 10–7)
- (3:13) AKR – Jordan Gant 16-yard pass from Ben Finley, Owen Wiley kick (Drive: 11 plays, 73 yards, 5:12; Akron 14–10)

Third quarter

- (10:38) AKR – Max Whisner 1-yard pass from Michael Johnson Jr., Owen Wiley kick (Drive: 8 plays, 84 yards, 4:16; Akron 21–10)
- (3:35) AKR – Conner Cravaack 2-yard pass from Ben Finley, Owen Wiley kick (Drive: 10 plays, 83 yards, 4:47; Akron 28–10)
- (0:02) CMU – Cade Graham 35-yard field goal (Drive: 7 plays, 58 yards, 3:33; Akron 28–13)

Fourth quarter

- (11:35) CMU – Angel Flores 2-yard run (Drive: 6 plays, 37 yards, 2:04; Akron 28–19)
- (1:33) CMU – Cade Graham 47-yard field goal (Drive: 9 plays, 60 yards, 2:34; Akron 28–22)

Statistics	CMU	AKR
First downs	20	20
Plays–yards	65–374	68–417
Rushes–yards	40–238	37–162
Passing yards	136	255
Passing: Comp–Att–Int	14–25–0	20–31–1
Turnovers	0	1
Time of possession	27:42	32:18

Team	Category	Player	Statistics
Central Michigan	Passing	Joe Labas	12/21, 134 yards
Central Michigan	Rushing	Brock Townsend	8 carries, 108 yards
Central Michigan	Receiving	Tyson Davis	3 receptions, 51 yards
Akron	Passing	Ben Finley	18/29, 252 yards, 3 TD, INT
Akron	Rushing	Jordan Gant	32 carries, 176 yards
Akron	Receiving	Kyan Mason	5 receptions, 125 yards, TD

=== Miami (OH) ===
Miami RedHawks (2–3) at Akron Zips (2–4) – Game summary

Quarter	1	2	3	4	Total
RedHawks	0	3	14	3	20
Zips	0	0	0	7	7

at InfoCision Stadium–Summa Field • Akron, Ohio

- Date: October 11
- Game time: 12:00 p.m. EDT
- Game weather: Sunny
- Game attendance: 6,575
- Referee: Chris La Mange
- TV announcers (ESPN+): Michael Reghi (play-by-play) and Ryan Cavanaugh (analyst)

Game information

First quarter

- No scoring plays.

Second quarter

- (1:33) M-OH – Dom Dzioban 41-yard field goal (Drive: 7 plays, 47 yards, 1:52; Miami (OH) 3–0)

Third quarter

- (10:32) M-OH – D'Shawntae Jones 1-yard run, Dom Dzioban kick (Drive: 9 plays, 75 yards, 4:28; Miami (OH) 10–0)
- (7:52) M-OH – Kam Perry 60-yard pass from Dequan Finn, Dom Dzioban kick (Drive: 2 plays, 64 yards, 0:52; Miami (OH) 17–0)

Fourth quarter

- (11:35) M-OH – Dom Dzioban 46-yard field goal (Drive: 4 plays, 2 yards, 1:40; Miami (OH) 20–0)
- (6:54) AKR – Israel Polk 5-yard pass from Ben Finley, Matthew Schramm kick (Drive: 11 plays, 75 yards, 4:41; Miami (OH) 20–7)

Statistics	M-OH	AKR
First downs	20	17
Plays–yards	67–350	64–273
Rushes–yards	41–147	25–62
Passing yards	203	211
Passing: Comp–Att–Int	14–26–1	21–39–1
Turnovers	1	1
Time of possession	34:12	25:48

Team	Category	Player	Statistics
Miami (OH)	Passing	Dequan Finn	14/25, 203 yards, TD, INT
Miami (OH)	Rushing	Jordan Brunson	19 carries, 72 yards
Miami (OH)	Receiving	Kam Perry	2 receptions, 77 yards, TD
Akron	Passing	Ben Finley	21/39, 211 yards, TD, INT
Akron	Rushing	Jordan Gant	14 carries, 35 yards
Akron	Receiving	Kyan Mason	5 receptions, 52 yards

=== at Ball State ===
Akron Zips (2–5) at Ball State Cardinals (2–4) – Game summary

Quarter	1	2	3	4	Total
Zips	8	7	10	3	28
Cardinals	14	0	14	14	42

at Scheumann Stadium • Muncie, Indiana

- Date: October 18
- Game time: 3:30 p.m. EDT
- Game weather: Cloudy, 81 degrees
- Game attendance: 12,248
- Referee: Andrew Speciale
- TV announcers (ESPN+): Jason Ross Jr. (play-by-play) and Tyoka Jackson (analyst)

Game information

First quarter

- AKR – Israel Polk 19-yard pass from Ben Finley (Michael Johnson Jr–Max Whisner pass), 11:42. Zips 8–0. Drive: 5 plays, 34 yards, 1:56.
- BALL – Kiael Kelly 3-yard run (Carson Holmer kick), 6:13. Zips 8–7. Drive: 10 plays, 75 yards, 5:29.
- BALL – Kiael Kelly 26-yard run (Carson Holmer kick), 0:45. Cardinals 14–8. Drive: 7 plays, 72 yards, 4:31.

Second quarter

- AKR – Kyan Mason 37-yard pass from Ben Finley (Matthew Schramm kick), 1:26. Zips 15–14. Drive: 10 plays, 96 yards, 2:52.

Third quarter

- BALL – Qua Ashley 69-yard run (Carson Holmer kick), 9:54. Cardinals 21–15. Drive: 2 plays, 72 yards, 0:54.
- AKR – Matthew Schramm 29-yard field goal, 7:28. Cardinals 21–18. Drive: 8 plays, 63 yards, 2:26.
- BALL – Koby Gross 29-yard pass from Kiael Kelly (Carson Holmer kick), 5:52. Cardinals 28–18. Drive: 3 plays, 75 yards, 1:36.
- AKR – Israel Polk 4-yard pass from Ben Finley (Matthew Schramm kick), 0:24. Cardinals 28–25. Drive: 5 plays, 52 yards, 2:16.

Fourth quarter

- BALL – Kiael Kelly 1-yard run (Carson Holmer kick), 10:43. Cardinals 35–25. Drive: 9 plays, 75 yards, 4:41.
- AKR – Matthew Schramm 19-yard field goal, 5:47. Cardinals 35–28. Drive: 10 plays, 74 yards, 4:56.
- BALL – TJ Horton 90-yard kickoff return (Carson Holmer kick), 5:34. Cardinals 42–28.

Statistics	AKR	BALL
First downs	24	17
Plays–yards	75–419	65–374
Rushes–yards	35–128	45–216
Passing yards	291	158
Passing: Comp–Att–Int	22–40–2	11–20–1
Turnovers	2	2
Time of possession	28:08	31:52

Team	Category	Player	Statistics
Akron	Passing	Ben Finley	22/40, 291 yards, 3 TD, 2 INT
Akron	Rushing	Jordan Gant	19 carries, 94 yards
Akron	Receiving	Tim Grear Jr.	4 receptions, 87 yards
Ball State	Passing	Kiael Kelly	10/19, 121 yards, TD, INT
Ball State	Rushing	Qua Ashley	20 carries, 143 yards, TD
Ball State	Receiving	Koby Gross	3 receptions, 81 yards, TD

=== at Buffalo ===
Akron Zips (2–6) at Buffalo Bulls (4–3) – Game summary

Quarter	1	2	3	4	Total
Zips	3	0	14	7	24
Bulls	2	8	3	3	16

at University at Buffalo Stadium • Amherst, New York

- Date: October 25
- Game time: 1:00 p.m. EDT
- Game weather: Sunny, 50 degrees
- Game attendance: 12,491
- Referee: Rich Edwards
- TV announcers (ESPN+): Shawn Kenney (play-by-play) and Ryan Cavanaugh (analyst)

Game information

First quarter

- AKR – Matthew Schramm 44-yard field goal, 9:37. Zips 3–0. Drive: 10 plays, 46 yards, 2:38.
- BUFF – Jonathan Capo Safety, 3:44. Zips 3–2.

Second quarter

- BUFF – Patrick Clacks III 1-yard pass from Ta'Quan Roberson (Ta'Quan Roberson–Marcus Velez pass), 0:09. Bulls 10–3. Drive: 1 play, 16 yards, 0:12.

Third quarter

- AKR – Kyan Mason 9-yard pass from Ben Finley (Matthew Schramm kick), 10:57. Tied 10–10. Drive: 12 plays, 75 yards, 4:03.
- BUFF – Jack Howes 21-yard field goal, 7:17. Bulls 13–10. Drive: 7 plays, 63 yards, 3:36.
- AKR – Conner Cravaack 5-yard pass from Ben Finley (Matthew Schramm kick), 4:54. Zips 17–13. Drive: 5 plays, 75 yards, 2:23.

Fourth quarter

- AKR – Ben Finley 38-yard run (Matthew Schramm kick), 11:46. Zips 24–13. Drive: 7 plays, 82 yards, 3:57.
- BUFF – Jack Howes 35-yard field goal, 6:04. Zips 24–16. Drive: 8 plays, 70 yards, 2:18.

Statistics	AKR	BUFF
First downs	18	19
Plays–yards	73–325	70–357
Rushes–yards	41–95	34–91
Passing yards	230	266
Passing: Comp–Att–Int	17–32–1	23–36–4
Turnovers	3	5
Time of possession	30:22	29:38

Team	Category	Player	Statistics
Akron	Passing	Ben Finley	17/32, 230 yards, 2 TD, INT
Akron	Rushing	Jordan Gant	25 carries, 92 yards
Akron	Receiving	Marcel Williams	6 receptions, 74 yards
Buffalo	Passing	Ta'Quan Roberson	23/36, 266 yards, TD, 4 INT
Buffalo	Rushing	Al-Jay Henderson	11 carries, 67 yards
Buffalo	Receiving	Nik McMillan	8 receptions, 177 yards

=== UMass ===
UMass Minutemen (0–8) at Akron Zips (3–6) – Game summary

Quarter	1	2	3	4	Total
Minutemen	10	0	0	0	10
Zips	14	13	10	7	44

at InfoCision Stadium–Summa Field • Akron, Ohio

- Date: November 4
- Game time: 7:00 PM EST
- Game weather: Sunny
- Game attendance: 5,046
- Referee: Billy Williams
- TV announcers (CBSSN): Jordan Kent (play-by-play) and Logan Ryan (analyst)

Game information

First quarter

- (14:11) AKR – Kyan Mason 15-yard pass from Ben Finley, Matthew Schramm kick (Drive: 3 plays, 19 yards, 0:42; Akron 7–0)
- (8:32) AKR – Israel Polk 13-yard pass from Ben Finley, Matthew Schramm kick (Drive: 9 plays, 71 yards, 4:42; Akron 14–0)
- (5:39) MASS – Magnus von Saldern 1-yard pass from AJ Hairston, Derek Morris kick (Drive: 6 plays, 70 yards, 2:53; Akron 14–7)
- (0:09) MASS – Derek Morris 55-yard field goal (Drive: 10 plays, 25 yards, 4:16; Akron 14–10)

Second quarter

- (11:48) AKR – Ben Finley 2-yard run, Matthew Schramm kick (Drive: 7 plays, 78 yards, 3:13; Akron 21–10)
- (2:14) AKR – Jordan Gant 1-yard run (Drive: 3 plays, 53 yards, 1:02; Akron 27–10)

Third quarter

- (6:33) AKR – Gage Summers 25-yard fumble recovery, Matthew Schramm kick (Akron 34–10)
- (2:23) AKR – Matthew Schramm 42-yard field goal (Drive: 8 plays, 36 yards, 2:49; Akron 37–10)

Fourth quarter

- (12:18) AKR – Jordan Gant 9-yard run, Matthew Schramm kick (Drive: 2 plays, 13 yards, 0:00; Akron 44–10)

Statistics	MASS	AKR
First downs	14	25
Plays–yards	55–169	68–467
Rushes–yards	27–77	46–237
Passing yards	92	230
Passing: Comp–Att–Int	16–28–0	14–22–0
Turnovers	3	1
Time of possession	24:47	35:13

Team	Category	Player	Statistics
UMass	Passing	AJ Hairston	12/20, 54 yards, TD
UMass	Rushing	Grant Jordan	7 carries, 51 yards
UMass	Receiving	Jacquon Gibson	6 receptions, 35 yards
Akron	Passing	Ben Finley	12/20, 197 yards, 2 TD
Akron	Rushing	Jordan Gant	28 carries, 153 yards, 2 TD
Akron	Receiving	Marcel Williams	4 receptions, 104 yards

=== Kent State (Wagon Wheel) ===
Kent State Golden Flashes (3–6) at Akron Zips (4–6) – Game summary

Quarter	1	2	3	4	OT	Total
Golden Flashes	7	7	14	7	7	42
Zips	3	14	0	18	0	35

at InfoCision Stadium–Summa Field • Akron, Ohio

- Date: November 11
- Game time: 7:30 PM EST
- Game weather: Sunny • Temperature: 33 °F (1 °C) • Wind: at 21 miles per hour (34 km/h)
- Game attendance: 8,501
- Referee: Marcel Kerr
- TV announcers (ESPNU): Chuckie Kempf (play-by-play) and Darius Walker (analyst)

Game information

First quarter

- (8:43) AKR – Matthew Schramm 29-yard field goal (Drive: 9 plays, 63 yards, 4:43; AKR 3-0)
- (3:51) KENT – Gavin Garcia 3-yard run, Will Hryszko kick (Drive: 2 plays, 9 yards, 0:26; KENT 7-3)

Second quarter

- (7:51) AKR – Jordan Grant 4-yard run, Matthew Schramm kick (Drive: 8 plays, 90 yards, 4:11; AKR 10-7)
- (2:50) KENT – Da'Realyst Clark 89-yard pass from Dru DeShields, Will Hryszko kick (Drive: 1 play, 89 yards, 0:11; KENT 14-10)
- (0:10) AKR – Marcel Williams 30-yard pass from Ben Finley, Matthew Schramm kick, (Drive: 11 plays, 75 yards, 2:40; AKR 17-14)

Third quarter

- (8:52) KENT – Cade Wolford 43-yard pass from Dru DeShields, Will Hryszko kick (Drive: 7 plays, 77 yards, 2:38; KENT 21-17)
- (6:18) KENT – Terik Mulder 7-yard pass from Dru DeShields, Will Hryszko kick (Drive: 3 plays, 12 yards, 1:12; KENT 28-17)

Fourth quarter

- (14:04) KENT – DaShawn Martin 27-yard pass from Dru DeShields, Will Hryszko kick (Drive: 2 plays, 31 yards, 0:41; KENT 35-17)
- (10:53) AKR – Marcel Williams 12-yard pass from Ben Finley, Matthew Schramm kick (Drive: 10 plays, 75 yards, 3:11; KENT 35-24)
- (7:12) AKR – Matthew Schramm 20-yard field goal (Drive: 8 plays, 37 yards, 3:41; KENT 35-27)
- (1:59) AKR – Israel Polk 13-yard pass from Ben Finley, Ben Finley-Marcel Williams pass (Drive: 9 plays, 58 yards, 3:11; Tied 35-35)

Overtime

- KENT – Ardell Banks 25-yard pass from Dru DeShields, Will Hryszko kick (Drive: 1 play, 25 yards, 0:00; KENT 42-35)

Statistics	KENT	AKR
First downs	13	33
Plays–yards	47–374	95–530
Rushes–yards	22–57	36–106
Passing yards	317	424
Passing: Comp–Att–Int	17–25–0	32–59–1
Turnovers	1	2
Time of possession	21:20	38:40

Team	Category	Player	Statistics
Kent State	Passing	Dru DeShields	17/25, 317 yards, 5 TD
Kent State	Rushing	Gavin Garcia	7 carries, 39 yards, TD
Kent State	Receiving	DaShawn Martin	4 receptions, 71 yards, TD
Akron	Passing	Ben Finley	32/59, 424 yards, 3 TD, INT
Akron	Rushing	Jordan Gant	22 carries, 96 yards, TD
Akron	Receiving	Marcel Williams	14 receptions, 206 yards, 2 TD

=== at Bowling Green ===
Akron Zips (4–7) at Bowling Green Falcons (3–8) – Game summary

Quarter	1	2	3	4	Total
Zips	3	3	10	3	19
Falcons	3	3	7	3	16

at Doyt Perry Stadium • Bowling Green, Ohio

- Date: November 18
- Game time: 7:00 PM EST
- Game weather: Overcast • Temperature: 40 °F (4 °C) • Wind: ENE at 7 miles per hour (11 km/h)
- Game attendance: 9,867
- Referee: Luke Richmond
- TV announcers (ESPNU): Shawn Kenney (play-by-play) and Je'Rod Cherry (analyst)

Game information

First quarter

- BGSU – Jackson Kleather 28-yard field goal, 8:45. Falcons 3–0. Drive: 14 plays, 65 yards, 6:15.
- AKR – Matthew Schramm 39-yard field goal, 5:14. Tied 3–3. Drive: 7 plays, 51 yards, 3:24.

Second quarter

- BGSU – Jackson Kleather 28-yard field goal, 12:00. Falcons 6–3. Drive: 9 plays, 40 yards, 3:42.
- AKR – Matthew Scrhamm 37-yard field goal, 1:47. Tied 6–6. Drive: 6 plays, 40 yards, 2:08.

Third quarter

- AKR – Matthew Schramm 48-yard field goal, 12:42. Zips 9–6. Drive: 7 plays, 15 yards, 2:09.
- BGSU – Jacob Harris 21-yard pass from Hunter Najm (Jackson Kleather kick), 3:53. Falcons 13–9. Drive: 5 plays, 43 yards, 2:12.
- AKR – Israel Polk 75-yard pass from Ben Finley (Matthew Schramm kick), 3:42. Zips 16–13. Drive: 1 play, 67 yards, 0:11.

Fourth quarter

- AKR – Matthew Schramm 30-yard field goal, 11:43. Zips 19–13. Drive: 11 plays, 67 yards, 4:49.
- BGSU – Jackson Kleather 31-yard field goal, 3:20. Zips 19–16. Drive: 16 plays, 44 yards, 8:19.

Statistics	AKR	BGSU
First downs	20	15
Plays–yards	65–319	71–272
Rushes–yards	37–143	45–134
Passing yards	176	138
Passing: Comp–Att–Int	9–28–1	9–26–2
Turnovers	3	2
Time of possession	25:48	34:12

Team	Category	Player	Statistics
Akron	Passing	Ben Finley	9/26, 176 yards, TD, INT
Akron	Rushing	Jordan Gant	22 carries, 86 yards
Akron	Receiving	Israel Polk	2 receptions, 85 yards, TD
Bowling Green	Passing	Hunter Najm	9/26, 138 yards, TD, 2 INT
Bowling Green	Rushing	Austyn Dendy	27 carries, 110 yards
Bowling Green	Receiving	Jyrin Johnson	3 receptions, 63 yards
