= Ben Finley (American football) =

American football player (born 2001)

Profile
- Position: Quarterback

Personal information
- Born: January 29, 2001 (age 25)
- Listed height: 6 ft 3 in (1.91 m)
- Listed weight: 210 lb (95 kg)

Career information
- High school: Paradise Valley (Phoenix, Arizona)
- College: NC State (2020–2022); California (2023); Akron (2024–2025)
- Stats at ESPN

Ben Finley (born January 29, 2001) is an American former football quarterback. He previously played college football for the NC State Wolfpack, the California Golden Bears, and the Akron Zips.

== Early life ==
Finley grew up in Phoenix, Arizona and attended Paradise Valley High School where he lettered in football, basketball and tennis. He was rated a three-star recruit and committed to play college football at NC State over offers from Arizona, Arizona State, Colorado State, Iowa State and Nevada.

== College career ==
=== NC State ===
Finley was an early enrollee at NC State in early 2020. In week six, Finley made his collegiate debut when he replaced starting quarterback Bailey Hockman in a loss against number 14 ranked North Carolina. In his only appearance in his true freshman season, he finished the game completing 13 out of 20 passing attempts for 143 yards with one touchdown and two interceptions. During the 2021 season, he played in four games and finished the season with completing five out of nine passing attempts for 28 yards. In 2022, he played in three games and finished the season with completing 65 out of 123 passing attempts for 741 yards with three touchdowns and three interceptions. He earned his first collegiate start against number 17 ranked North Carolina. Finley led the Wolfpack to a double overtime victory over the Tar Heels where he completed 27 of 40 attempts for 271 yards and two touchdowns. Finley started the following week in the season finale against Maryland where he completed 22 of 48 pass attempts for 269 yards, but threw two interceptions in the loss. On April 11, 2023, Finley announced that he would be entering the transfer portal. On April 26, 2023, he announced that he would be transferring to California.

=== California ===
In 2023, Finley competed with Sam Jackson and Fernando Mendoza for the starting job. Jackson won the job, but in week one against North Texas, Finley relieved an injured Jackson where he completed 24 of 34 attempts for 289 yards and one touchdown to one interception. Finley earned the start the following week against Auburn. He completed 7 of 11 attempts for 31 yards, but was replaced by Jackson in the second quarter in the 14–10 loss. The following week, Finley played just a few plays in a win against Idaho. He was named the starter the following week against Washington, but was knocked out and replaced once again by Jackson. He ended the game 17 of 32 for 207 yards and two touchdowns, but was intercepted three times. Finley entered the transfer portal a second time on November 28, 2023.

=== Akron ===
On January 3, 2024, Finley announced that he would be transferring to Akron. In August, Finley was named the starting quarterback for week one against Ohio State. On the first offensive play of the season, Finley injured his shoulder on a tackle from Buckeyes cornerback Davison Igbinosun. Finley later returned, but was injured yet again on a hit from Buckeyes linebacker Jack Sawyer. Finley exited the game a few plays later and did not return. In his Zips debut, Finley completed 8 of 14 passes for 53 yards and an interception. Finley started week two, where he threw for 129 yards on 14 of 31 attempts. He threw for his first Zips touchdown pass in a loss to Rutgers. In week three, Finley threw for a then career high 358 yards and four touchdowns in a 31–20 win over Colgate. On the season, Finley completed 212 of 387 passes for 2,604 yards with 16 touchdowns and nine interceptions.

In 2025, Finley returned as the starting quarterback. In week 11 against rival Kent State, Finley threw for a career high 424 yards on 32 of 59 passing with three touchdowns and an interception in an overtime loss. The 424 passing yards ranked fourth all-time in the Zips single game performances.

=== Statistics ===
Season	Team	Games			Passing								Rushing			
Season	Team	GP	GS	Record	Cmp	Att	Pct	Yds	Y/A	TD	Int	Rtg	Att	Yds	Avg	TD
2020	NC State	1	0	—	13	20	65.0	143	7.2	1	2	121.6	2	−9	−4.5	0
2021	NC State	4	0	—	5	9	55.6	28	3.1	0	0	81.7	2	7	3.5	0
2022	NC State	3	2	1–1	65	123	52.8	741	6.0	3	3	106.6	6	−8	−1.3	0
2023	California	7	2	0–2	54	94	57.4	572	6.1	3	4	110.6	12	8	0.7	0
2024	Akron	12	12	4–8	212	387	54.8	2,604	6.7	16	9	120.3	81	52	0.6	0
2025	Akron	11	11	5–6	186	362	51.4	2,475	6.8	19	9	121.2	69	130	1.9	2
Career		38	27	10–17	535	995	53.8	6,563	6.6	42	27	117.7	172	180	1.0	2

== Personal life ==
Finley was born and raised in Phoenix, Arizona. Both of his parents were college athletes at St. Olaf College; his mother, Robin, played women's tennis, and his father, Pat, played football. His older brother, Ryan, played also as a quarterback for the Cincinnati Bengals.
