= Zac Derr =

American football player

No. 2
- Position: Kicker

Career information
- College: Akron
- NFL draft: 2002: undrafted

Career history
- Dallas Cowboys (2002)*; Atlanta Falcons (2004, 2006)*
- * Offseason or practice squad member only

Awards and highlights
- Second-team All-MAC (2001)

Zac Derr is an American former football placekicker in the National Football League, having played for the Dallas Cowboys, Detroit Lions, and Atlanta Falcons.

He was signed by the Falcons May 12, 2006, in an open competition against Seth Marler, Ryan Rossner, and Tony Yelk. He was waived on July 30 after suffering a torn groin injury, with both sides reaching an injury settlement the next day.

After this, Zac attended Seminary and became a pastor. He is currently preaching at The Chapel in Wadsworth, Ohio.
