= 2000–01 NCAA Division I men's basketball season =

American basketball season

- Preseason AP No. 1: Arizona Wildcats
- Regular season: November 8, 2000– March 10, 2001
- NCAA Tournament: 2001
- Tournament dates: March 13 – April 2, 2001
- National Championship: Hubert H. Humphrey Metrodome; Minneapolis, Minnesota
- NCAA Champions: Duke Blue Devils
- Other champions: Tulsa Golden Hurricane (NIT)
- Player of the Year (Naismith, Wooden): Shane Battier, Duke Blue Devils

The 2000–01 NCAA Division I men's basketball season began on November 8, 2000, progressed through the regular season and conference tournaments, and concluded with the 2001 NCAA Men's Division I Basketball Tournament Championship Game on April 2, 2001, at the Hubert H. Humphrey Metrodome in Minneapolis, Minnesota. The Duke Blue Devils won their third NCAA national championship with an 82–72 victory over the Arizona Wildcats.

== Season headlines ==
- The preseason AP All-American team was named on November 13. Shane Battier of Duke was the leading vote-getter (71 of 72 votes). The rest of the team included Troy Murphy of Notre Dame (62 votes), Loren Woods of Arizona (46), Joseph Forte of North Carolina (39) and Jamaal Tinsley of Iowa State (39).
- On January 27, 2001, a plane carrying two Oklahoma State players, six other people (coaches and broadcasters) associated with the Oklahoma State men's basketball program, and a crew of two crashed in a field near Strasburg, Colorado, during a snowstorm, killing all ten people on board.
- The NCAA tournament expanded from 64 to 65 teams.
- The Trans America Athletic Conference competed under that name for the last time. After the season, it was renamed the Atlantic Sun Conference.

== Major rule changes ==
Beginning in 2000–01, the following rules changes were implemented:

- Technical fouls divided into direct (two-shot penalty) and indirect (one shot penalty) with ball returned to point of interruption.

== Season outlook ==
=== Pre-season polls ===
The top 25 from the AP and ESPN/USA Today Coaches Polls November 9, 2000.

Associated Press
| Ranking | Team |
|---|---|
| 1 | Arizona (37) |
| 2 | Duke (29) |
| 3 | Michigan State (5) |
| 4 | Stanford |
| 5 | Maryland (1) |
| 6 | North Carolina |
| 7 | Kansas |
| 8 | Illinois |
| 9 | Tennessee |
| 10 | Seton Hall |
| 11 | Florida |
| 12 | Kentucky |
| 13 | Utah |
| 14 | Connecticut |
| 15 | Arkansas |
| 15 | Notre Dame |
| 17 | UCLA |
| 18 | Cincinnati |
| 19 | Wisconsin |
| 20 | Wake Forest |
| 21 | DePaul |
| 22 | Oklahoma |
| 23 | Southern California |
| 24 | Virginia |
| 25 | Iowa State |

ESPN/USA Today Coaches
| Ranking | Team |
|---|---|
| 1 | Arizona (19) |
| 2 | Duke (12) |
| 3 | Stanford |
| 4 | North Carolina |
| 5 | Michigan State |
| 6 | Kansas |
| 7 | Maryland |
| 8 | Tennessee |
| 9 | Illinois |
| 10 | Seton Hall |
| 11 | Florida |
| 12 | Kentucky |
| 13 | Connecticut |
| 14 | Cincinnati |
| 15 | Arkansas |
| 16 | Utah |
| 17 | Notre Dame |
| 18 | Wake Forest |
| 19 | UCLA |
| 20 | DePaul |
| 21 | Oklahoma |
| 22 | Wisconsin |
| 23 | Iowa State |
| 24 | Southern California |
| 25 | Virginia |

== Conference membership changes ==
These schools joined new conferences for the 2000–01 season.

| School | Former conference | New conference |
|---|---|---|
| Middle Tennessee State Blue Raiders | Ohio Valley Conference | Sun Belt Conference |
| Nevada Wolf Pack | Big West Conference | Western Athletic Conference |
| New Mexico State Aggies | Big West Conference | Sun Belt Conference |
| North Texas Mean Green | Big West Conference | Sun Belt Conference |
| Virginia Tech Hokies | Atlantic 10 Conference | Big East Conference |

== Regular season ==
=== Conferences ===
==== Conference winners and tournaments ====
| Conference | Regular season winner | Conference player of the year | Conference tournament | Tournament venue (City) | Tournament winner |
|---|---|---|---|---|---|
| America East Conference | Hofstra | Norman Richardson, Hofstra | 2001 America East men's basketball tournament | Bob Carpenter Center (Newark, Delaware) (Except Finals) | Hofstra |
| Atlantic 10 Conference | St. Joseph's | David West, Xavier | 2001 Atlantic 10 men's basketball tournament | The Spectrum (Philadelphia, Pennsylvania) | Temple |
| Atlantic Coast Conference | Duke & North Carolina | Shane Battier, Duke & Joseph Forte, North Carolina | 2001 ACC men's basketball tournament | Georgia Dome (Atlanta, Georgia) | Duke |
| Big 12 Conference | Iowa State | Jamaal Tinsley, Iowa State | 2001 Big 12 men's basketball tournament | Kemper Arena (Kansas City, Missouri) | Oklahoma |
| Big East Conference | Boston College (East); Notre Dame (West) | Troy Bell, Boston College & Troy Murphy, Notre Dame | 2001 Big East men's basketball tournament | Madison Square Garden (New York City, New York) | Boston College |
| Big Sky Conference | Cal State Northridge | Brian Heinle, Cal State Northridge | 2001 Big Sky Conference men's basketball tournament | Matadome (Northridge, California) | Cal State Northridge |
| Big South Conference | Radford | Torrey Butler, Coastal Carolina | 2001 Big South Conference men's basketball tournament | Roanoke Civic Center (Roanoke, Virginia) | Winthrop |
| Big Ten Conference | Michigan State & Illinois | Frank Williams, Illinois | 2001 Big Ten Conference men's basketball tournament | United Center (Chicago, Illinois) | Iowa |
| Big West Conference | UC Irvine | Jerry Green, UC Irvine | 2001 Big West Conference men's basketball tournament | Anaheim Convention Center (Anaheim, California) | Utah State |
| Colonial Athletic Association | Richmond | George Evans, George Mason | 2001 CAA men's basketball tournament | Richmond Coliseum (Richmond, Virginia) | George Mason |
| Conference USA | Cincinnati (American); Southern Miss (National) | Steve Logan, Cincinnati | 2001 Conference USA men's basketball tournament | Freedom Hall (Louisville, Kentucky) | Charlotte |
| Ivy League | Princeton | Craig Austin, Columbia | No Tournament | | |
| Metro Atlantic Athletic Conference | Iona, Siena & Niagara | Demond Stewart, Niagara | 2001 MAAC men's basketball tournament | HSBC Arena (Buffalo, New York) | Iona |
| Mid-American Conference | Kent State (East); Central Michigan (West) | David Webber, Central Michigan | 2001 MAC men's basketball tournament | Gund Arena (Cleveland, Ohio) | Kent State |
| Mid-Continent Conference | Southern Utah & Valparaiso | Jeff Monaco, Southern Utah | 2001 Mid-Continent Conference men's basketball tournament | Allen County War Memorial Coliseum (Fort Wayne, Indiana) | Southern Utah |
| Mid-Eastern Athletic Conference | Hampton & South Carolina State | Tarvis Williams, Hampton | 2001 Mid-Eastern Athletic Conference men's basketball tournament | Richmond Coliseum (Richmond, Virginia) | Hampton |
| Midwestern Collegiate Conference | Butler | Rashad Phillips, Detroit | 2001 Midwestern Collegiate Conference men's basketball tournament | Nutter Center (Dayton, Ohio) | Butler |
| Missouri Valley Conference | Creighton | Tarise Bryson, Illinois State | 2001 Missouri Valley Conference men's basketball tournament | Savvis Center (St. Louis, Missouri) | Indiana State |
| Mountain West Conference | BYU, Wyoming & Utah | Mekeli Wesley, BYU | 2001 Mountain West Conference men's basketball tournament | Thomas & Mack Center (Las Vegas, Nevada) | BYU |
| Northeast Conference | St. Francis (NY) | Rahsaan Johnson, Monmouth | 2001 Northeast Conference men's basketball tournament | Sovereign Bank Arena (Trenton, New Jersey) | Monmouth |
| Ohio Valley Conference | Tennessee Tech | Trenton Hassell, Austin Peay | 2001 Ohio Valley Conference men's basketball tournament | Gaylord Entertainment Center (Nashville, Tennessee) (Semifinals and Finals) | Eastern Illinois |
| Pacific-10 Conference | Stanford | Sean Lampley, California | No Tournament | | |
| Patriot League | Holy Cross | Tim Szatko, Holy Cross | 2001 Patriot League men's basketball tournament | Campus Sites | Holy Cross |
| Southeastern Conference | Florida & Kentucky (East); Mississippi (West) | Tayshaun Prince, Kentucky | 2001 SEC men's basketball tournament | Gaylord Entertainment Center (Nashville, Tennessee) | Kentucky |
| Southern Conference | East Tennessee State (North); Charleston (South) | Jody Lumpkin, Charleston | 2001 Southern Conference men's basketball tournament | BI-LO Center (Greenville, South Carolina) | UNC Greensboro |
| Southland Conference | McNeese State | Demond Mallet, McNeese State | 2001 Southland Conference men's basketball tournament | CenturyTel Center (Bossier City, Louisiana) (Finals) | Northwestern State |
| Southwestern Athletic Conference | Alabama State | Dewayne Jefferson, Mississippi Valley State | 2001 Southwestern Athletic Conference men's basketball tournament | Fair Park Arena (Birmingham, Alabama) | Alabama State |
| Sun Belt Conference | Western Kentucky (East); South Alabama (West) | Chris Marcus, Western Kentucky | 2001 Sun Belt Conference men's basketball tournament | Mitchell Center (Mobile, Alabama) | Western Kentucky |
| Trans America Athletic Conference | Georgia State | Shernard Long, Georgia State | 2001 TAAC men's basketball tournament | GSU Sports Arena (Atlanta, Georgia) | Georgia State |
| West Coast Conference | Gonzaga | Casey Calvary, Gonzaga | 2001 West Coast Conference men's basketball tournament | Jenny Craig Pavilion (San Diego, California) | Gonzaga |
| Western Athletic Conference | Fresno State | Melvin Ely, Fresno State | 2001 WAC men's basketball tournament | Reynolds Center (Tulsa, Oklahoma) | Hawaiʻi |

==== Conference standings ====
2000–01 America East Conference men's basketball standings
| | Conf. | | | | Overall |
| Team | W | | L | PCT | W | | L | PCT |
|---|---|---|---|---|---|---|---|---|
| Hofstra † | 16 | – | 2 | .889 | 26 | – | 5 | .839 |
| Delaware | 14 | – | 4 | .778 | 20 | – | 10 | .667 |
| Drexel | 12 | – | 6 | .667 | 15 | – | 12 | .556 |
| Maine | 10 | – | 8 | .556 | 18 | – | 11 | .621 |
| Boston University | 9 | – | 9 | .500 | 14 | – | 14 | .500 |
| Northeastern | 8 | – | 10 | .444 | 10 | – | 19 | .345 |
| Towson | 7 | – | 11 | .389 | 12 | – | 17 | .414 |
| Vermont | 7 | – | 11 | .389 | 12 | – | 17 | .414 |
| New Hampshire | 6 | – | 12 | .333 | 7 | – | 21 | .250 |
| Hartford | 1 | – | 17 | .056 | 4 | – | 24 | .143 |
† 2001 America East tournament winner Rankings from AP poll

2000–01 ACC men's basketball standings
| | Conf. | | | | Overall |
| Team | W | | L | PCT | W | | L | PCT |
|---|---|---|---|---|---|---|---|---|
| No. 6 North Carolina | 13 | – | 3 | .813 | 26 | – | 7 | .788 |
| No. 1 Duke † | 13 | – | 3 | .813 | 35 | – | 4 | .897 |
| No. 11 Maryland | 10 | – | 6 | .625 | 25 | – | 11 | .694 |
| No. 16 Virginia | 9 | – | 7 | .563 | 20 | – | 9 | .690 |
| Georgia Tech | 8 | – | 8 | .500 | 17 | – | 13 | .567 |
| No. 23 Wake Forest | 8 | – | 8 | .500 | 19 | – | 11 | .633 |
| NC State | 5 | – | 11 | .313 | 13 | – | 16 | .448 |
| Florida State | 4 | – | 12 | .250 | 9 | – | 21 | .300 |
| Clemson | 2 | – | 14 | .125 | 12 | – | 19 | .387 |
† 2001 ACC tournament winner Rankings from AP Poll

2000–01 Atlantic 10 men's basketball standings
| | Conf. | | | | Overall |
| Team | W | | L | PCT | W | | L | PCT |
|---|---|---|---|---|---|---|---|---|
| No. 22 Saint Joseph's | 14 | – | 2 | .875 | 26 | – | 7 | .788 |
| Xavier | 12 | – | 4 | .750 | 21 | – | 8 | .724 |
| Temple † | 12 | – | 4 | .750 | 24 | – | 13 | .649 |
| UMass | 11 | – | 5 | .688 | 15 | – | 15 | .500 |
| Dayton | 9 | – | 7 | .563 | 21 | – | 13 | .618 |
| St. Bonaventure | 9 | – | 7 | .563 | 18 | – | 12 | .600 |
| George Washington | 6 | – | 10 | .375 | 14 | – | 18 | .438 |
| La Salle | 5 | – | 11 | .313 | 12 | – | 17 | .414 |
| Fordham | 4 | – | 12 | .250 | 12 | – | 17 | .414 |
| Duquesne | 3 | – | 13 | .188 | 9 | – | 21 | .300 |
| Rhode Island | 3 | – | 13 | .188 | 7 | – | 23 | .233 |
† 2001 Atlantic 10 Tournament winner Rankings from AP Poll

2000–01 Big 12 men's basketball standings
| | Conf. | | | | Overall |
| Team | W | | L | PCT | W | | L | PCT |
|---|---|---|---|---|---|---|---|---|
| No. 10 Iowa State | 13 | – | 3 | .813 | 25 | – | 6 | .806 |
| No. 12 Kansas | 12 | – | 4 | .750 | 26 | – | 7 | .788 |
| No. 13 Oklahoma † | 12 | – | 4 | .750 | 26 | – | 7 | .788 |
| No. 18 Texas | 12 | – | 4 | .750 | 25 | – | 9 | .735 |
| Oklahoma State | 10 | – | 6 | .625 | 20 | – | 10 | .667 |
| Missouri | 9 | – | 7 | .563 | 20 | – | 13 | .606 |
| Nebraska | 7 | – | 9 | .438 | 14 | – | 16 | .467 |
| Baylor | 6 | – | 10 | .375 | 19 | – | 12 | .613 |
| Colorado | 5 | – | 11 | .313 | 15 | – | 15 | .500 |
| Kansas State | 4 | – | 12 | .250 | 11 | – | 18 | .379 |
| Texas A&M | 3 | – | 13 | .188 | 10 | – | 20 | .333 |
| Texas Tech | 3 | – | 13 | .188 | 9 | – | 19 | .321 |
† 2001 Big 12 Tournament winner Rankings from AP poll

2000–01 Big East men's basketball standings
| | Conf. | | | | Overall |
| Team | W | | L | PCT | W | | L | PCT |
|---|---|---|---|---|---|---|---|---|
East
| No. 7 Boston College † | 13 | – | 3 | .813 | 27 | – | 5 | .844 |
| Providence | 11 | – | 5 | .688 | 21 | – | 10 | .677 |
| St. John's# | 8 | – | 8 | .500 | 5 | – | 15 | .250 |
| Miami | 8 | – | 8 | .500 | 16 | – | 13 | .552 |
| Villanova | 8 | – | 8 | .500 | 18 | – | 13 | .581 |
| Connecticut | 8 | – | 8 | .500 | 20 | – | 12 | .625 |
| Virginia Tech* | 2 | – | 14 | .125 | 8 | – | 19 | .296 |
West
| No. 19 Notre Dame | 11 | – | 5 | .688 | 20 | – | 10 | .667 |
| No. 21 Georgetown | 10 | – | 6 | .625 | 25 | – | 8 | .758 |
| No. 17 Syracuse | 10 | – | 6 | .625 | 25 | – | 9 | .735 |
| West Virginia | 8 | – | 8 | .500 | 17 | – | 12 | .586 |
| Pittsburgh | 7 | – | 9 | .438 | 19 | – | 14 | .576 |
| Seton Hall | 5 | – | 11 | .313 | 16 | – | 15 | .516 |
| Rutgers* | 3 | – | 13 | .188 | 11 | – | 16 | .407 |
† 2001 Big East tournament winner As of April 2, 2001; Rankings from AP Poll #St. John's had 9 regular-season games vacated due to sanctions against the program; the school′s disputed record was 8–8, 14–15. *Did not qualify for 2001 Big East tournament.

2000–01 Big Sky men's basketball standings
| | Conf. | | | | Overall |
| Team | W | | L | PCT | W | | L | PCT |
|---|---|---|---|---|---|---|---|---|
| Cal State Northridge † | 13 | – | 3 | .813 | 22 | – | 10 | .688 |
| Eastern Washington | 11 | – | 5 | .688 | 17 | – | 11 | .607 |
| Idaho State | 10 | – | 6 | .625 | 14 | – | 14 | .500 |
| Montana State | 8 | – | 8 | .500 | 16 | – | 14 | .533 |
| Northern Arizona | 8 | – | 8 | .500 | 15 | – | 14 | .517 |
| Weber State | 8 | – | 8 | .500 | 15 | – | 14 | .517 |
| Montana | 6 | – | 10 | .375 | 11 | – | 16 | .407 |
| Portland State | 6 | – | 10 | .375 | 9 | – | 18 | .333 |
| Sacramento State | 2 | – | 14 | .125 | 5 | – | 22 | .185 |
† Conference tournament winner Rankings from AP Poll

2000–01 Big South Conference men's basketball standings
| | Conf. | | | | Overall |
| Team | W | | L | PCT | W | | L | PCT |
|---|---|---|---|---|---|---|---|---|
| Radford | 12 | – | 2 | .857 | 19 | – | 10 | .655 |
| Winthrop † | 11 | – | 3 | .786 | 18 | – | 13 | .581 |
| UNC Asheville | 9 | – | 5 | .643 | 15 | – | 13 | .536 |
| Coastal Carolina | 6 | – | 8 | .429 | 8 | – | 20 | .286 |
| Charleston Southern | 6 | – | 8 | .429 | 10 | – | 19 | .345 |
| Liberty | 5 | – | 9 | .357 | 15 | – | 13 | .536 |
| Elon* | 4 | – | 10 | .286 | 9 | – | 20 | .310 |
| High Point* | 3 | – | 11 | .214 | 8 | – | 20 | .286 |
† 2001 Big South tournament winner Rankings from AP Poll; *Ineligible for conference tournament

2000–01 Big Ten Conference men's basketball standings
| | Conf. | | | | Overall |
| Team | W | | L | PCT | W | | L | PCT |
|---|---|---|---|---|---|---|---|---|
| No. 4 Illinois | 13 | – | 3 | .813 | 27 | – | 8 | .771 |
| No. 3 Michigan State | 13 | – | 3 | .813 | 28 | – | 5 | .848 |
| No. 20 Indiana | 10 | – | 6 | .625 | 21 | – | 13 | .618 |
| No. 25 Wisconsin | 9 | – | 7 | .563 | 18 | – | 11 | .621 |
| No. 24 Iowa † | 7 | – | 9 | .438 | 23 | – | 12 | .657 |
| Penn State | 7 | – | 9 | .438 | 21 | – | 12 | .636 |
| Purdue | 6 | – | 10 | .375 | 17 | – | 15 | .531 |
| Minnesota | 5 | – | 11 | .313 | 18 | – | 14 | .563 |
| Michigan | 4 | – | 12 | .250 | 10 | – | 18 | .357 |
| Northwestern | 3 | – | 13 | .188 | 11 | – | 19 | .367 |
| Ohio State* | 0 | – | 0 | – | 0 | – | 0 | – |
† 2001 Big Ten tournament winner Rankings from AP poll *Ohio State: 30 reg. season games; 1 NCAA Tourn. game vacated due to sanctions against the program Disputed record: Ohio State-(20-11)(11-5)

2000–01 Big West men's basketball standings
| | Conf. | | | | Overall |
| Team | W | | L | PCT | W | | L | PCT |
|---|---|---|---|---|---|---|---|---|
| UC Irvine | 15 | – | 1 | .938 | 25 | – | 5 | .833 |
| Utah State † | 13 | – | 3 | .813 | 28 | – | 6 | .824 |
| Long Beach State | 10 | – | 6 | .625 | 18 | – | 13 | .581 |
| UC Santa Barbara | 10 | – | 6 | .625 | 18 | – | 13 | .581 |
| Pacific | 8 | – | 8 | .500 | 18 | – | 12 | .600 |
| Boise State | 8 | – | 8 | .500 | 17 | – | 14 | .548 |
| Cal Poly | 3 | – | 13 | .188 | 9 | – | 19 | .321 |
| Idaho | 3 | – | 13 | .188 | 6 | – | 21 | .222 |
| Cal State Fullerton | 3 | – | 13 | .188 | 5 | – | 23 | .179 |
† 2001 Big West tournament winner

2000–01 CAA men's basketball standings
| | Conf. | | | | Overall |
| Team | W | | L | PCT | W | | L | PCT |
|---|---|---|---|---|---|---|---|---|
| Richmond | 12 | – | 4 | .750 | 22 | – | 7 | .759 |
| UNC Wilmington | 11 | – | 5 | .688 | 19 | – | 11 | .633 |
| George Mason † | 11 | – | 5 | .688 | 18 | – | 12 | .600 |
| VCU | 9 | – | 7 | .563 | 16 | – | 14 | .533 |
| William & Mary | 7 | – | 9 | .438 | 11 | – | 17 | .393 |
| Old Dominion | 7 | – | 9 | .438 | 13 | – | 18 | .419 |
| James Madison | 6 | – | 10 | .375 | 12 | – | 17 | .414 |
| East Carolina | 6 | – | 10 | .375 | 14 | – | 14 | .500 |
| American | 3 | – | 13 | .188 | 7 | – | 20 | .259 |
† 2001 CAA tournament winner Rankings from AP Poll

2000–01 Conference USA men's basketball standings
| | Conf. | | | | Overall |
| Team | W | | L | PCT | W | | L | PCT |
|---|---|---|---|---|---|---|---|---|
American
| Cincinnati | 11 | – | 5 | .688 | 25 | – | 10 | .714 |
| Charlotte † | 10 | – | 6 | .625 | 22 | – | 11 | .667 |
| Marquette | 9 | – | 7 | .563 | 15 | – | 14 | .517 |
| Saint Louis | 8 | – | 8 | .500 | 17 | – | 14 | .548 |
| Louisville | 8 | – | 8 | .500 | 12 | – | 19 | .387 |
| DePaul | 4 | – | 12 | .250 | 12 | – | 18 | .400 |
National
| Southern Miss | 11 | – | 5 | .688 | 22 | – | 9 | .710 |
| Memphis | 10 | – | 6 | .625 | 21 | – | 15 | .583 |
| South Florida | 9 | – | 7 | .563 | 18 | – | 13 | .581 |
| UAB | 8 | – | 8 | .500 | 17 | – | 14 | .548 |
| Houston | 6 | – | 10 | .375 | 9 | – | 20 | .310 |
| Tulane | 2 | – | 14 | .125 | 9 | – | 21 | .300 |
† 2001 Conference USA Tournament winner Rankings from AP Poll

2000–01 Ivy League men's basketball standings
| | Conf. | | | | Overall |
| Team | W | | L | PCT | W | | L | PCT |
|---|---|---|---|---|---|---|---|---|
| Princeton | 11 | – | 3 | .786 | 16 | – | 11 | .593 |
| Brown | 9 | – | 5 | .643 | 15 | – | 12 | .556 |
| Penn | 9 | – | 5 | .643 | 12 | – | 17 | .414 |
| Harvard | 7 | – | 7 | .500 | 14 | – | 12 | .538 |
| Columbia | 7 | – | 7 | .500 | 12 | – | 15 | .444 |
| Yale | 7 | – | 7 | .500 | 10 | – | 17 | .370 |
| Dartmouth | 3 | – | 11 | .214 | 8 | – | 19 | .296 |
| Cornell | 3 | – | 11 | .214 | 7 | – | 20 | .259 |
Rankings from AP Poll

2000–01 MAAC men's basketball standings
| | Conf. | | | | Overall |
| Team | W | | L | PCT | W | | L | PCT |
|---|---|---|---|---|---|---|---|---|
| Iona † | 12 | – | 6 | .667 | 22 | – | 11 | .667 |
| Niagara | 12 | – | 6 | .667 | 15 | – | 13 | .536 |
| Siena | 12 | – | 6 | .667 | 20 | – | 11 | .645 |
| Marist | 11 | – | 7 | .611 | 17 | – | 13 | .567 |
| Rider | 11 | – | 7 | .611 | 16 | – | 12 | .571 |
| Manhattan | 11 | – | 7 | .611 | 14 | – | 15 | .483 |
| Canisius | 9 | – | 9 | .500 | 20 | – | 11 | .645 |
| Fairfield | 8 | – | 10 | .444 | 12 | – | 16 | .429 |
| Loyola (MD) | 2 | – | 16 | .111 | 6 | – | 23 | .207 |
| Saint Peter's | 2 | – | 16 | .111 | 4 | – | 24 | .143 |
† 2001 MAAC tournament winner Rankings from AP Poll

2000–01 Mid-American Conference men's basketball standings
| | Conf. | | | | Overall |
| Team | W | | L | PCT | W | | L | PCT |
|---|---|---|---|---|---|---|---|---|
East
| Kent State † | 13 | – | 5 | .722 | 24 | – | 10 | .706 |
| Marshall | 12 | – | 6 | .667 | 18 | – | 9 | .667 |
| Ohio | 12 | – | 6 | .667 | 19 | – | 11 | .633 |
| Bowling Green | 10 | – | 8 | .556 | 15 | – | 14 | .517 |
| Miami (OH) | 10 | – | 8 | .556 | 17 | – | 16 | .515 |
| Akron | 9 | – | 9 | .500 | 12 | – | 16 | .429 |
| Buffalo | 2 | – | 16 | .111 | 4 | – | 24 | .143 |
West
| Central Michigan | 14 | – | 4 | .778 | 20 | – | 8 | .714 |
| Toledo | 12 | – | 6 | .667 | 22 | – | 11 | .667 |
| Ball State | 11 | – | 7 | .611 | 18 | – | 12 | .600 |
| Western Michigan | 7 | – | 11 | .389 | 7 | – | 21 | .250 |
| Northern Illinois | 4 | – | 14 | .222 | 5 | – | 23 | .179 |
| Eastern Michigan | 1 | – | 17 | .056 | 3 | – | 25 | .107 |
† 2001 MAC tournament winner Rankings from AP Poll

2000–01 Mid-Continent Conference men's basketball standings
| | Conf. | | | | Overall |
| Team | W | | L | PCT | W | | L | PCT |
|---|---|---|---|---|---|---|---|---|
| Valparaiso | 13 | – | 3 | .813 | 24 | – | 8 | .750 |
| Southern Utah † | 13 | – | 3 | .813 | 25 | – | 6 | .806 |
| Youngstown State | 11 | – | 5 | .688 | 19 | – | 11 | .633 |
| UMKC | 9 | – | 7 | .563 | 14 | – | 16 | .467 |
| Oakland | 8 | – | 8 | .500 | 12 | – | 16 | .429 |
| IUPUI | 6 | – | 10 | .375 | 11 | – | 18 | .379 |
| Oral Roberts | 5 | – | 11 | .313 | 10 | – | 19 | .345 |
| Western Illinois | 5 | – | 11 | .313 | 5 | – | 23 | .179 |
| Chicago State | 2 | – | 14 | .125 | 5 | – | 23 | .179 |
† 2001 Mid-Con Tournament winner

2000–01 MEAC men's basketball standings
| | Conf. | | | | Overall |
| Team | W | | L | PCT | W | | L | PCT |
|---|---|---|---|---|---|---|---|---|
| Hampton † | 14 | – | 4 | .778 | 25 | – | 7 | .781 |
| South Carolina State | 14 | – | 4 | .778 | 19 | – | 13 | .594 |
| Delaware State | 11 | – | 7 | .611 | 13 | – | 15 | .464 |
| Norfolk State | 11 | – | 7 | .611 | 12 | – | 17 | .414 |
| Coppin State | 11 | – | 8 | .579 | 13 | – | 15 | .464 |
| Maryland Eastern Shore | 10 | – | 8 | .556 | 12 | – | 16 | .429 |
| North Carolina A&T | 8 | – | 10 | .444 | 13 | – | 17 | .433 |
| Howard | 8 | – | 10 | .444 | 10 | – | 18 | .357 |
| Bethune–Cookman | 5 | – | 13 | .278 | 10 | – | 19 | .345 |
| Florida A&M | 4 | – | 14 | .222 | 6 | – | 22 | .214 |
| Morgan State | 4 | – | 15 | .211 | 6 | – | 23 | .207 |
† 2001 MEAC tournament winner Rankings from AP Poll

2000–01 Midwestern Collegiate Conference men's basketball standings
| | Conf. | | | | Overall |
| Team | W | | L | PCT | W | | L | PCT |
|---|---|---|---|---|---|---|---|---|
| Butler † | 11 | – | 3 | .786 | 24 | – | 8 | .750 |
| Detroit | 10 | – | 4 | .714 | 25 | – | 12 | .676 |
| Cleveland State | 9 | – | 5 | .643 | 19 | – | 13 | .594 |
| Wright State | 8 | – | 6 | .571 | 18 | – | 11 | .621 |
| Milwaukee | 7 | – | 7 | .500 | 15 | – | 13 | .536 |
| UIC | 5 | – | 9 | .357 | 11 | – | 17 | .393 |
| Green Bay | 4 | – | 10 | .286 | 11 | – | 17 | .393 |
| Loyola Chicago | 2 | – | 12 | .143 | 7 | – | 21 | .250 |
† 2001 MCC tournament winner

2000–01 Missouri Valley Conference men's basketball standings
| | Conf. | | | | Overall |
| Team | W | | L | PCT | W | | L | PCT |
|---|---|---|---|---|---|---|---|---|
| Creighton | 14 | – | 4 | .778 | 24 | – | 8 | .750 |
| Bradley | 12 | – | 6 | .667 | 19 | – | 12 | .613 |
| Illinois State | 12 | – | 6 | .667 | 21 | – | 9 | .700 |
| Southern Illinois | 10 | – | 8 | .556 | 16 | – | 14 | .533 |
| Indiana State † | 10 | – | 8 | .556 | 22 | – | 12 | .647 |
| Evansville | 9 | – | 9 | .500 | 14 | – | 16 | .467 |
| Drake | 8 | – | 10 | .444 | 12 | – | 16 | .429 |
| Southwest Missouri State | 8 | – | 10 | .444 | 13 | – | 16 | .448 |
| Wichita State | 4 | – | 14 | .222 | 9 | – | 19 | .321 |
| Northern Iowa | 3 | – | 15 | .167 | 7 | – | 24 | .226 |
† 2001 MVC tournament winner Rankings from AP Poll

2000–01 Mountain West Conference men's basketball standings
| | Conf. | | | | Overall |
| Team | W | | L | PCT | W | | L | PCT |
|---|---|---|---|---|---|---|---|---|
| Utah | 10 | – | 4 | .714 | 19 | – | 12 | .613 |
| BYU † | 10 | – | 4 | .714 | 24 | – | 9 | .727 |
| Wyoming | 10 | – | 4 | .714 | 20 | – | 10 | .667 |
| UNLV | 7 | – | 7 | .500 | 16 | – | 13 | .552 |
| New Mexico | 6 | – | 8 | .429 | 21 | – | 13 | .618 |
| Colorado State | 6 | – | 8 | .429 | 15 | – | 13 | .536 |
| San Diego State | 4 | – | 10 | .286 | 14 | – | 14 | .500 |
| Air Force | 3 | – | 11 | .214 | 8 | – | 21 | .276 |
† 2001 Mountain West tournament winner Rankings from AP Poll

2000–01 Northeast Conference men's basketball standings
| | Conf. | | | | Overall |
| Team | W | | L | PCT | W | | L | PCT |
|---|---|---|---|---|---|---|---|---|
| St. Francis (NY) | 16 | – | 4 | .800 | 18 | – | 11 | .621 |
| Monmouth † | 15 | – | 5 | .750 | 21 | – | 10 | .677 |
| UMBC | 13 | – | 7 | .650 | 18 | – | 11 | .621 |
| Long Island | 12 | – | 8 | .600 | 12 | – | 16 | .429 |
| Wagner | 11 | – | 9 | .550 | 16 | – | 13 | .552 |
| Central Connecticut | 11 | – | 9 | .550 | 14 | – | 14 | .500 |
| Fairleigh Dickinson | 10 | – | 10 | .500 | 13 | – | 15 | .464 |
| Saint Francis (PA) | 9 | – | 11 | .450 | 9 | – | 18 | .333 |
| Mount St. Mary's | 7 | – | 13 | .350 | 7 | – | 21 | .250 |
| Robert Morris | 7 | – | 13 | .350 | 7 | – | 22 | .241 |
| Sacred Heart | 6 | – | 14 | .300 | 7 | – | 21 | .250 |
| Quinnipiac | 3 | – | 17 | .150 | 6 | – | 21 | .222 |
† 2001 NEC tournament winner

2000–01 Ohio Valley Conference men's basketball standings
| | Conf. | | | | Overall |
| Team | W | | L | PCT | W | | L | PCT |
|---|---|---|---|---|---|---|---|---|
| Tennessee Tech | 13 | – | 3 | .813 | 20 | – | 9 | .690 |
| Eastern Illinois † | 11 | – | 5 | .688 | 21 | – | 10 | .677 |
| Murray State | 11 | – | 5 | .688 | 17 | – | 12 | .586 |
| Austin Peay | 10 | – | 6 | .625 | 22 | – | 10 | .688 |
| Southeast Missouri State | 8 | – | 8 | .500 | 18 | – | 12 | .600 |
| Tennessee State | 7 | – | 9 | .438 | 10 | – | 19 | .345 |
| Morehead State | 6 | – | 10 | .375 | 12 | – | 16 | .429 |
| Tennessee-Martin | 5 | – | 11 | .313 | 10 | – | 18 | .357 |
| Eastern Kentucky | 1 | – | 15 | .063 | 7 | – | 19 | .269 |
† 2001 Ohio Valley Tournament winner Rankings from AP Poll

2000–01 Pacific-10 Conference men's basketball standings
| | Conf. | | | | Overall |
| Team | W | | L | PCT | W | | L | PCT |
|---|---|---|---|---|---|---|---|---|
| No. 5 Stanford | 16 | – | 2 | .889 | 31 | – | 3 | .912 |
| No. 2 Arizona | 15 | – | 3 | .833 | 28 | – | 8 | .778 |
| No. 12 UCLA | 14 | – | 4 | .778 | 23 | – | 9 | .719 |
| No. 14 USC | 11 | – | 7 | .611 | 24 | – | 10 | .706 |
| California | 11 | – | 7 | .611 | 20 | – | 11 | .645 |
| Oregon | 5 | – | 13 | .278 | 14 | – | 14 | .500 |
| Arizona State | 5 | – | 13 | .278 | 13 | – | 16 | .448 |
| Washington State | 5 | – | 13 | .278 | 12 | – | 16 | .429 |
| Oregon State | 4 | – | 14 | .222 | 10 | – | 20 | .333 |
| Washington | 4 | – | 14 | .222 | 10 | – | 20 | .333 |
As of November 30, 2007; Rankings from Coaches Poll

2000–01 Patriot League men's basketball standings
| | Conf. | | | | Overall |
| Team | W | | L | PCT | W | | L | PCT |
|---|---|---|---|---|---|---|---|---|
| Holy Cross † | 10 | – | 2 | .833 | 22 | – | 8 | .733 |
| Navy | 9 | – | 3 | .750 | 19 | – | 12 | .613 |
| Colgate | 6 | – | 6 | .500 | 13 | – | 15 | .464 |
| Lehigh | 6 | – | 6 | .500 | 13 | – | 16 | .448 |
| Lafayette | 4 | – | 8 | .333 | 12 | – | 16 | .429 |
| Bucknell | 4 | – | 8 | .333 | 14 | – | 15 | .483 |
| Army | 3 | – | 9 | .250 | 9 | – | 19 | .321 |
† 2001 Patriot League tournament winner

2000–01 Southeastern Conference men's basketball standings
| | Conf. | | | | Overall |
| Team | W | | L | PCT | W | | L | PCT |
|---|---|---|---|---|---|---|---|---|
East
| No. 8 Florida | 12 | – | 4 | .750 | 24 | – | 7 | .774 |
| No. 9 Kentucky † | 12 | – | 4 | .750 | 24 | – | 10 | .706 |
| Georgia | 9 | – | 7 | .563 | 16 | – | 15 | .516 |
| Tennessee | 8 | – | 8 | .500 | 22 | – | 11 | .667 |
| South Carolina | 6 | – | 10 | .375 | 15 | – | 15 | .500 |
| Vanderbilt | 4 | – | 12 | .250 | 15 | – | 15 | .500 |
West
| No. 14 Ole Miss | 11 | – | 5 | .688 | 27 | – | 8 | .771 |
| Arkansas | 10 | – | 6 | .625 | 20 | – | 11 | .645 |
| Alabama | 8 | – | 8 | .500 | 25 | – | 11 | .694 |
| Mississippi State | 7 | – | 9 | .438 | 18 | – | 13 | .581 |
| Auburn | 7 | – | 9 | .438 | 18 | – | 14 | .563 |
| LSU | 2 | – | 14 | .125 | 13 | – | 16 | .448 |
† 2001 SEC tournament winner Rankings from AP Poll

2000–01 Southern Conference men's basketball standings
| | Conf. | | | | Overall |
| Team | W | | L | PCT | W | | L | PCT |
|---|---|---|---|---|---|---|---|---|
North
| East Tennessee State | 13 | – | 3 | .813 | 18 | – | 10 | .643 |
| UNC Greensboro † | 10 | – | 6 | .625 | 19 | – | 12 | .613 |
| Appalachian State | 7 | – | 9 | .438 | 11 | – | 20 | .355 |
| Davidson | 7 | – | 9 | .438 | 15 | – | 17 | .469 |
| VMI | 5 | – | 11 | .313 | 9 | – | 19 | .321 |
| Western Carolina | 3 | – | 13 | .188 | 6 | – | 25 | .194 |
South
| College of Charleston | 12 | – | 4 | .750 | 22 | – | 7 | .759 |
| Chattanooga | 9 | – | 7 | .563 | 17 | – | 13 | .567 |
| The Citadel | 9 | – | 7 | .563 | 16 | – | 12 | .571 |
| Georgia Southern | 9 | – | 7 | .563 | 15 | – | 15 | .500 |
| Wofford | 7 | – | 9 | .438 | 12 | – | 16 | .429 |
| Furman | 5 | – | 11 | .313 | 10 | – | 16 | .385 |
† SoCon Tournament winner As of April 30, 2001; Rankings from AP poll

2000–01 Southland Conference men's basketball standings
| | Conf. | | | | Overall |
| Team | W | | L | PCT | W | | L | PCT |
|---|---|---|---|---|---|---|---|---|
| McNeese State | 17 | – | 3 | .850 | 22 | – | 9 | .710 |
| Nicholls State | 12 | – | 8 | .600 | 14 | – | 14 | .500 |
| UTSA | 12 | – | 8 | .600 | 14 | – | 15 | .483 |
| Northwestern State † | 11 | – | 9 | .550 | 19 | – | 13 | .594 |
| Sam Houston State | 11 | – | 9 | .550 | 16 | – | 13 | .552 |
| Texas–Arlington | 11 | – | 9 | .550 | 13 | – | 15 | .464 |
| Southwest Texas State | 10 | – | 10 | .500 | 13 | – | 15 | .464 |
| Louisiana–Monroe | 8 | – | 12 | .400 | 11 | – | 17 | .393 |
| Lamar | 7 | – | 13 | .350 | 9 | – | 18 | .333 |
| Stephen F. Austin | 6 | – | 14 | .300 | 9 | – | 17 | .346 |
| Southeastern Louisiana | 5 | – | 15 | .250 | 8 | – | 21 | .276 |
† 2001 Southland Conference tournament winner Rankings from AP Poll

2000–01 SWAC men's basketball standings
| | Conf. | | | | Overall |
| Team | W | | L | PCT | W | | L | PCT |
|---|---|---|---|---|---|---|---|---|
| Alabama State † | 15 | – | 3 | .833 | 22 | – | 9 | .710 |
| Mississippi Valley State | 14 | – | 4 | .778 | 18 | – | 9 | .667 |
| Alabama A&M | 13 | – | 5 | .722 | 17 | – | 11 | .607 |
| Alcorn State | 13 | – | 5 | .722 | 15 | – | 15 | .500 |
| Southern | 8 | – | 10 | .444 | 11 | – | 16 | .407 |
| Grambling State | 8 | – | 10 | .444 | 8 | – | 18 | .308 |
| Jackson State | 7 | – | 11 | .389 | 7 | – | 23 | .233 |
| Texas Southern | 5 | – | 13 | .278 | 7 | – | 22 | .241 |
| Prairie View A&M | 5 | – | 13 | .278 | 6 | – | 22 | .214 |
| Arkansas–Pine Bluff | 2 | – | 16 | .111 | 2 | – | 25 | .074 |
† 2001 SWAC tournament winner Rankings from AP Poll

2000–01 Sun Belt Conference men's basketball standings
| | Conf. | | | | Overall |
| Team | W | | L | PCT | W | | L | PCT |
|---|---|---|---|---|---|---|---|---|
East
| Western Kentucky † | 14 | – | 2 | .875 | 24 | – | 7 | .774 |
| Arkansas State | 10 | – | 6 | .625 | 17 | – | 13 | .567 |
| Louisiana Tech | 10 | – | 6 | .625 | 17 | – | 12 | .586 |
| Arkansas-Little Rock | 9 | – | 7 | .563 | 18 | – | 11 | .621 |
| Florida International | 5 | – | 11 | .313 | 8 | – | 21 | .276 |
| Middle Tennessee | 1 | – | 15 | .063 | 5 | – | 22 | .185 |
West
| South Alabama | 11 | – | 5 | .688 | 22 | – | 11 | .667 |
| Louisiana–Lafayette | 10 | – | 6 | .625 | 16 | – | 13 | .552 |
| New Orleans | 10 | – | 6 | .625 | 17 | – | 12 | .586 |
| New Mexico State | 10 | – | 6 | .625 | 14 | – | 14 | .500 |
| Denver | 5 | – | 11 | .313 | 10 | – | 18 | .357 |
| North Texas | 1 | – | 15 | .063 | 4 | – | 24 | .143 |
† 2001 Sun Belt Conference tournament winner Rankings from AP Poll

2000–01 Trans America Athletic Conference men's basketball standings
| | Conf. | | | | Overall |
| Team | W | | L | PCT | W | | L | PCT |
|---|---|---|---|---|---|---|---|---|
| Georgia State † | 16 | – | 2 | .889 | 29 | – | 5 | .853 |
| Troy | 12 | – | 6 | .667 | 19 | – | 12 | .613 |
| Jacksonville | 11 | – | 7 | .611 | 18 | – | 10 | .643 |
| Stetson | 11 | – | 7 | .611 | 17 | – | 12 | .586 |
| Samford | 11 | – | 7 | .611 | 15 | – | 14 | .517 |
| Mercer | 10 | – | 8 | .556 | 13 | – | 15 | .464 |
| Jacksonville State | 6 | – | 12 | .333 | 9 | – | 19 | .321 |
| Campbell | 5 | – | 13 | .278 | 7 | – | 21 | .250 |
| Florida Atlantic | 5 | – | 13 | .278 | 7 | – | 24 | .226 |
| Central Florida | 3 | – | 15 | .167 | 8 | – | 23 | .258 |
† 2001 TAAC tournament winner Rankings from AP Poll

2000–01 West Coast Conference men's basketball standings
| | Conf. | | | | Overall |
| Team | W | | L | PCT | W | | L | PCT |
|---|---|---|---|---|---|---|---|---|
| Gonzaga † | 13 | – | 1 | .929 | 26 | – | 7 | .788 |
| Pepperdine | 12 | – | 2 | .857 | 22 | – | 9 | .710 |
| Santa Clara | 10 | – | 4 | .714 | 20 | – | 12 | .625 |
| San Diego | 7 | – | 7 | .500 | 16 | – | 13 | .552 |
| San Francisco | 5 | – | 9 | .357 | 12 | – | 18 | .400 |
| Loyola Marymount | 5 | – | 9 | .357 | 9 | – | 19 | .321 |
| Portland | 4 | – | 10 | .286 | 11 | – | 17 | .393 |
| Saint Mary's | 0 | – | 14 | .000 | 2 | – | 27 | .069 |
† 2001 WCC tournament winner Rankings from AP Poll

2000–01 WAC men's basketball standings
| | Conf. | | | | Overall |
| Team | W | | L | PCT | W | | L | PCT |
|---|---|---|---|---|---|---|---|---|
| Fresno State | 13 | – | 3 | .813 | 26 | – | 7 | .788 |
| Tulsa | 10 | – | 6 | .625 | 26 | – | 11 | .703 |
| UTEP | 10 | – | 6 | .625 | 23 | – | 9 | .719 |
| TCU | 9 | – | 7 | .563 | 20 | – | 11 | .645 |
| Hawaii † | 8 | – | 8 | .500 | 17 | – | 14 | .548 |
| SMU | 8 | – | 8 | .500 | 18 | – | 12 | .600 |
| San Jose State | 6 | – | 10 | .375 | 14 | – | 14 | .500 |
| Rice | 5 | – | 11 | .313 | 14 | – | 16 | .467 |
| Nevada | 3 | – | 13 | .188 | 10 | – | 18 | .357 |
† 2001 WAC tournament winner

=== Division I independents ===
Five schools played as Division I independents.

2000–01 NCAA Division I men's basketball independents standings
| | Conf. | | | | Overall |
| Team | W | | L | PCT | W | | L | PCT |
|---|---|---|---|---|---|---|---|---|
| Stony Brook | - | – | - | – | 17 | – | 11 | .607 |
| Belmont | - | – | - | – | 13 | – | 15 | .464 |
| Texas–Pan American | - | – | - | – | 12 | – | 17 | .414 |
| Centenary | - | – | - | – | 8 | – | 19 | .296 |
| Albany | - | – | - | – | 6 | – | 22 | .214 |
Rankings from AP Poll

=== Informal championships ===
| Conference | Regular season winner | Most Valuable Player |
|---|---|---|
| Philadelphia Big 5 | Villanova | Michael Bradley, Villanova, & Marvin O'Connor, Saint Joseph's |

Villanova finished with a 4–0 record in head-to-head competition among the Philadelphia Big 5.

=== Statistical leaders ===
Source for additional stats categories

| Points per game | | | Rebounds per game | | | Assists per game | | | Steals per game | | |
| Player | School | PPG | Player | School | RPG | Player | School | APG | Player | School | SPG |
| Ronnie McCollum | Centenary | 29.1 | Chris Marcus | W. Kentucky | 12.1 | Markus Carr | CS Northridge | 8.9 | Greedy Daniels | TCU | 4.3 |
| Kyle Hill | E. Illinois | 23.8 | Reggie Evans | Iowa | 11.9 | Omar Cook | St. John's | 8.7 | Desmond Cambridge | Alabama A&M | 3.8 |
| Dewayne Jefferson | Miss. Valley St. | 23.6 | J. R. Van Hoose | Marshall | 11.1 | Sean Kennedy | Marist | 8.1 | Senecca Wall | Sam Houston St. | 3.6 |
| Tarise Bryson | Illinois St. | 22.8 | David West | Xavier | 10.9 | Tito Maddox | Fresno St. | 8.0 | John Linehan | Providence | 3.1 |
| Henry Domercant | E. Illinois | 22.8 | Eddie Griffin | Seton Hall | 10.8 | Ashley Robinson | Miss. Valley St. | 7.4 | Fred House | S. Utah | 3.0 |

| Blocked shots per game | | | Field-goal percentage | | | Three-Point FG percentage | | | Free-throw percentage | | |
| Player | School | BPG | Player | School | FG% | Player | School | 3FG% | Player | School | FT% |
| Tarvis Williams | Hampton | 4.6 | Michael Bradley | Villanova | 69.2 | Amory Sanders | SE Missouri St. | 55.8 | Gary Buchanan | Villanova | 94.2 |
| Eddie Griffin | Seton Hall | 4.4 | Nakiea Miller | Iona | 66.8 | David Falknor | Akron | 54.0 | Brent Jolly | Tenn. Tech | 93.1 |
| Wojciech Myrda | LA-Monroe | 4.4 | Kimani Ffriend | Nebraska | 62.3 | Cary Cochran | Nebraska | 47.3 | Ryan Mendez | Stanford | 93.1 |
| Kris Hunter | Jacksonville | 4.1 | Andre Hutson | Michigan St. | 62.2 | Casey Jacobsen | Stanford | 47.2 | Rashad Phillips | Detroit | 91.6 |
| Ken Johnson | Ohio St. | 4.0 | George Evans | George Mason | 61.3 | Tim Erickson | Idaho St. | 46.3 | Ronnie McCollum | Centenary | 90.7 |

== Post-season tournaments ==
=== NCAA tournament ===
==== Final Four – Hubert H. Humphrey Metrodome, Minneapolis, Minnesota ====
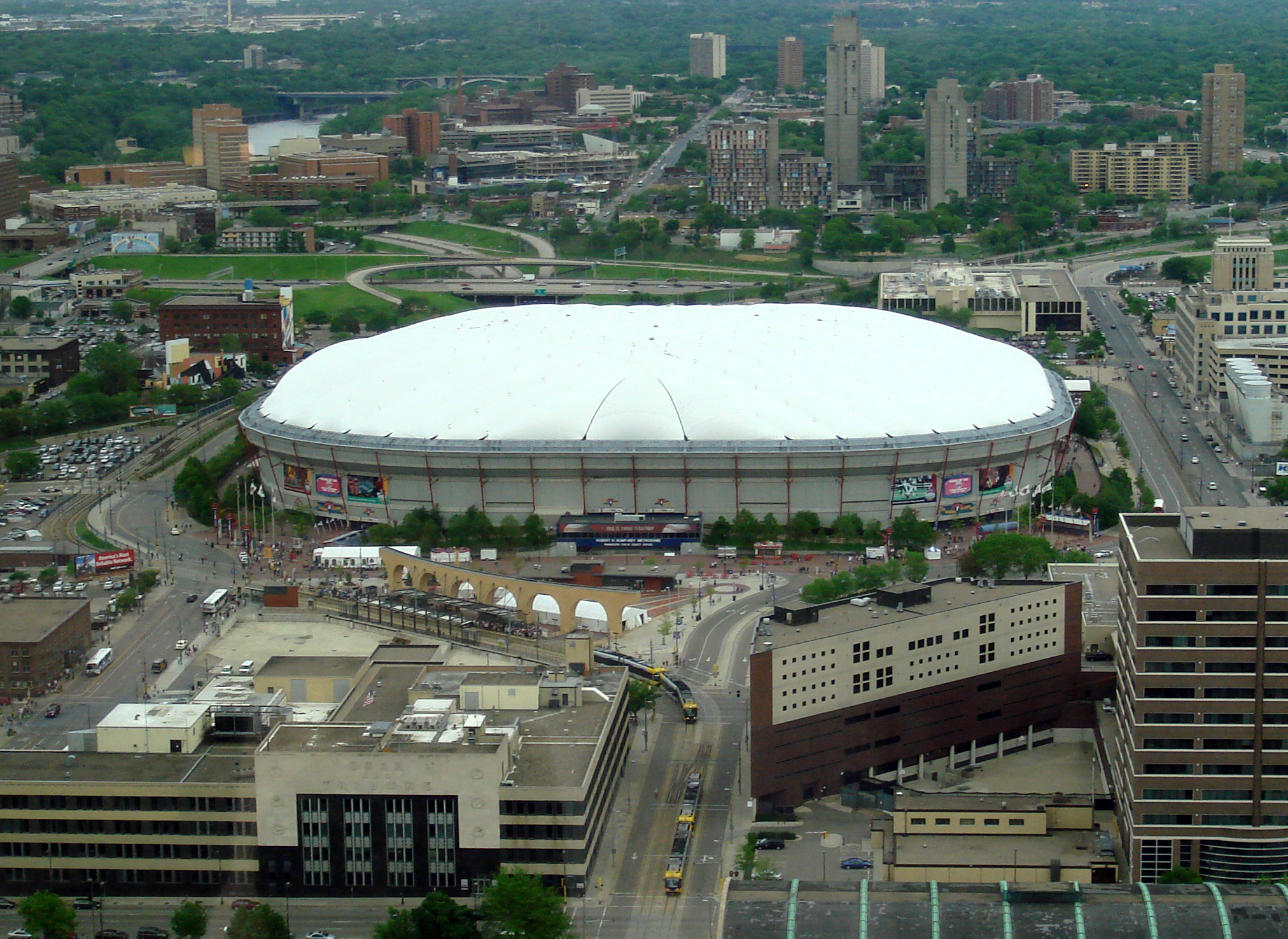
The Hubert H. Humphrey Metrodome in Minneapolis, Minnesota, hosted the NCAA men's Final Four.

National semifinals
E1 | Duke | 95
W3 | Maryland | 84
S1 | Michigan State | 61
M2 | Arizona | 80

National finals
E1 | Duke | 82
M2 | Arizona | 72

=== National Invitation tournament ===
==== Semifinals & finals ====
Semifinals
Detroit Mercy | 63
Alabama | 74
Tulsa | 72
Memphis | 64

Finals
Alabama | 66
Tulsa | 79
Third place
Detroit Mercy | 71
Memphis | 86

== Award winners ==
=== Consensus All-American teams ===
Consensus First Team
| Player | Position | Class | Team |
|---|---|---|---|
| Shane Battier | F | Senior | Duke |
| Joseph Forte | G | Sophomore | North Carolina |
| Casey Jacobsen | G/F | Sophomore | Stanford |
| Troy Murphy | F | Junior | Notre Dame |
| Jason Williams | G | Sophomore | Duke |

Consensus Second Team
| Player | Position | Class | Team |
|---|---|---|---|
| Troy Bell | G | Sophomore | Boston College |
| Michael Bradley | F/C | Junior | Villanova |
| Tayshaun Prince | F | Junior | Kentucky |
| Jason Richardson | G/F | Sophomore | Michigan State |
| Jamaal Tinsley | G | Senior | Iowa State |

=== Major player of the year awards ===
- Wooden Award: Shane Battier, Duke
- Naismith Award: Shane Battier, Duke
- Associated Press Player of the Year: Shane Battier, Duke
- NABC Player of the Year: Jason Williams, Duke
- Oscar Robertson Trophy (USBWA): Shane Battier, Duke
- Adolph Rupp Trophy: Shane Battier, Duke
- Sporting News Player of the Year: Shane Battier, Duke

=== Major freshman of the year awards ===
- USBWA Freshman of the Year: Eddie Griffin, Seton Hall
- Sporting News Freshman of the Year: Eddie Griffin, Seton Hall

=== Major coach of the year awards ===
- Associated Press Coach of the Year: Matt Doherty, North Carolina
- Henry Iba Award (USBWA): Al Skinner, Boston College
- NABC Coach of the Year: Tom Izzo, Michigan State
- Naismith College Coach of the Year: Rod Barnes, Mississippi
- CBS/Chevrolet Coach of the Year: Al Skinner, Boston College
- Sporting News Coach of the Year: Al Skinner, Boston College

=== Other major awards ===
- Pete Newell Big Man Award (Best big man): Jason Collins, Stanford
- NABC Defensive Player of the Year: Shane Battier, Duke
- Frances Pomeroy Naismith Award (Best player under 6'0): Rashad Phillips, Detroit
- Lowe's Senior CLASS Award (top senior): Shane Battier, Duke
- Robert V. Geasey Trophy (Top player in Philadelphia Big 5): Michael Bradley, Villanova & Marvin O'Connor, St. Joseph's
- NIT/Haggerty Award (Top player in New York City metro area): Norman Richardson, Hofstra
- Chip Hilton Player of the Year Award (Strong personal character): Shane Battier, Duke

== Coaching changes ==
A number of teams changed coaches during the season and after it ended.

| Team | Former Coach | Interim Coach | New Coach | Reason |
|---|---|---|---|---|
| Butler | Thad Matta | | Todd Lickliter | Matta left for the Xavier job. |
| Cal Poly | Jeff Schneider | Kevin Bromley | | Schneider resigned January 10, 2001. Assistant coach Kevin Bromley took over as interim. After the season, Bromley was promoted to head coach. |
| Denver | Marty Fletcher | | Terry Carroll | |
| Drexel | Steve Seymour | | Bruiser Flint | |
| Duquesne | Darrelle Porter | | Danny Nee | |
| Florida A&M | Mickey Clayton | | Mike Gillespie | Clayton left to be Florida A&M Athletic Director. |
| George Washington | Tom Penders | | Karl Hobbs | |
| Hofstra | Jay Wright | | Tom Pecora | |
| Idaho | David Farrar | | Leonard Perry | |
| Kent State | Gary Waters | | Stan Heath | |
| La Salle | Speedy Morris | | Billy Hahn | |
| Louisville | Denny Crum | | Rick Pitino | |
| McNeese State | Ron Everhart | | Tic Price | |
| Michigan | Brian Ellerbe | | Tommy Amaker | |
| Milwaukee | Bo Ryan | | Bruce Pearl | |
| Morgan State | Chris Fuller | | Butch Beard | |
| New Orleans | Joey Stiebing | | Monte Towe | |
| North Texas | Vic Trilli | | Johnny Jones | |
| Northeastern | Rudy Keeling | | Ron Everhart | |
| Northern Illinois | Brian Hammel | Andy Greer | Rob Judson | |
| Ohio | Larry Hunter | | Tim O'Shea | |
| Old Dominion | Jeff Capel II | | Blaine Taylor | |
| Pepperdine | Jan van Breda Kolff | | Paul Westphal | |
| Portland | Rob Chavez | | Michael Holton | |
| Rhode Island | Jerry DeGregorio | | Jim Baron | |
| Robert Morris | Danny Nee | | Mark Schmidt | |
| Rutgers | Kevin Bannon | | Gary Waters | |
| Saint Mary's | Dave Bollwinkel | | Randy Bennett | |
| Seton Hall | Tommy Amaker | | Louis Orr | |
| Siena | Louis Orr | | Rob Lanier | |
| South Carolina | Eddie Fogler | | Dave Odom | |
| Southern | Tommie Green | | Ben Jobe | |
| St. Bonaventure | Jim Baron | | Jan van Breda Kolff | |
| Tennessee | Jerry Green | | Buzz Peterson | |
| Texas Southern | Robert Moreland | | Ronnie Courtney | |
| Texas Tech | James Dickey | | Bob Knight | |
| Towson | Mike Jaskulski | | Michael Hunt | |
| Tulsa | Buzz Peterson | | John Phillips | |
| UMass | Bruiser Flint | | Steve Lappas | |
| UMKC | Dean Demopoulos | | Rich Zvosec | |
| UNLV | Bill Bayno | Max Good | Charlie Spoonhour | |
| Villanova | Steve Lappas | | Jay Wright | |
| Wake Forest | Dave Odom | | Skip Prosser | |
| Wisconsin | Dick Bennett | Brad Soderberg | Bo Ryan | |
| Xavier | Skip Prosser | | Thad Matta | |
