= Tayshaun Prince =

American basketball player and executive (born 1980)

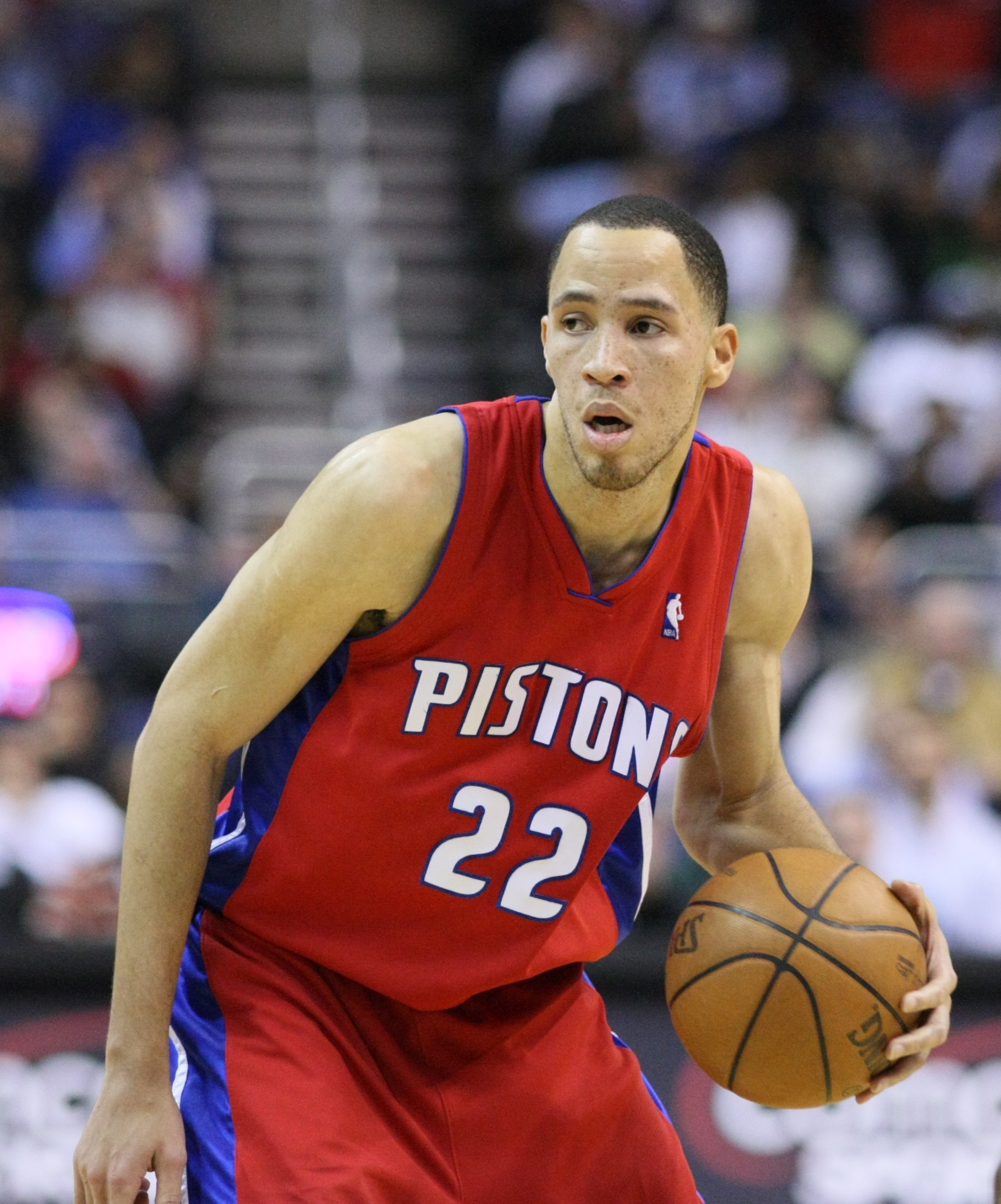
- Prince with the Detroit Pistons in 2008

Memphis Grizzlies
- Title: Vice President of Basketball Affairs
- League: NBA

Personal information
- Born: February 28, 1980 (age 46) Compton, California, U.S.
- Listed height: 6 ft 9 in (2.06 m)
- Listed weight: 212 lb (96 kg)

Career information
- High school: Dominguez (Compton, California)
- College: Kentucky (1998–2002)
- NBA draft: 2002: 1st round, 23rd overall pick
- Drafted by: Detroit Pistons
- Playing career: 2002–2016
- Position: Small forward
- Number: 22, 21, 12

Career history
- 2002–2013: Detroit Pistons
- 2013–2015: Memphis Grizzlies
- 2015: Boston Celtics
- 2015: Detroit Pistons
- 2015–2016: Minnesota Timberwolves

Career highlights
- NBA champion (2004); 4× NBA All-Defensive Second Team (2005–2008); Consensus second-team All-American (2001); Second-team All-American – NABC (2002); Third-team All-American – AP (2002); SEC Player of the Year (2001); SEC tournament MVP (2001); 2× First-team All-SEC (2001, 2002); Second-team All-SEC (2000); McDonald's All-American (1998); Second-team Parade All-American (1998); California Mr. Basketball (1998)

Career statistics
- Points: 11,272 (11.1 ppg)
- Rebounds: 4,332 (4.3 rpg)
- Assists: 2,406 (2.4 apg)
- Stats at NBA.com
- Stats at Basketball Reference
Medals
Men's basketball
Representing United States
Olympic Games
Gold medal – first place	2008 Beijing	National Team
FIBA Americas Championship
Gold medal – first place	2007 Las Vegas	National Team

Tayshaun Durell Prince (born February 28, 1980) is an American professional basketball executive and former player for the National Basketball Association (NBA). The 6-foot-9-inch (2.06 m) small forward graduated from Dominguez High School before playing college basketball for the University of Kentucky. He was drafted 23rd overall by the Detroit Pistons in the 2002 NBA draft and went on to win a championship with the team in 2004.

Prince is most remembered for his performance with the Pistons in the 2004 NBA playoffs. During Game 2 of the Eastern Conference Finals against the Indiana Pacers, with the Pistons leading 69–67, Prince prevented the game from potentially going to overtime by preventing a go-ahead transition layup by Reggie Miller, blocking the shot in a play known as "The Block".

In 2013, Prince was traded from the Pistons to the Memphis Grizzlies. In 2015, Prince was traded to the Boston Celtics before being traded back to the Pistons. Prince later became a free agent and played one season for the Minnesota Timberwolves before retiring in 2016.

Following his retirement, Prince ventured into executive leadership in the NBA. He currently serves as the Vice President of Basketball Affairs for the Grizzlies.

== Early life ==
Tayshaun Durell Prince was born on February 28, 1980, in Compton, California. He attended Dominguez High School in Compton.

== College career ==
Prince played four seasons (1998 to 2002) for the Kentucky Wildcats, averaging 13.2 points and 5.7 rebounds as the Wildcats posted a 97–39 record and advanced to the NCAA Tournament each year. Prince won SEC Player of the Year in his junior season (2000–2001)—also leading the SEC in free throw percentage (84.3%)—and was named to the Associated Press All-SEC Teams in both his junior and senior years. Kentucky won the SEC Tournament in 1999 and 2001, and Prince was awarded the 2001 tournament's Most Valuable Player award. He was a three-time team MVP with the Wildcats.

Notable individual performances included a 31-point, 11-rebound, four-assist, and four-steal effort in a 79–59 victory over North Carolina. In scoring Kentucky's first fifteen points, Prince made five consecutive three-point shots. Kentucky shooting guard Keith Bogans compared Prince's performance to "the Chicago Bulls' Michael Jordan blistering Portland in the 1992 NBA Finals." In an 87–82 victory over Tulsa during the 2002 NCAA Tournament, Prince scored a career-high 41 points (along with nine rebounds, four assists and three blocks) to lead Kentucky to the Sweet 16. He graduated from Kentucky in 2002 with a degree in sociology.

== Professional career ==
=== Detroit Pistons (2002–2013) ===
==== Rookie season and championship (2002–2004) ====
In his rookie season under head coach Rick Carlisle, Prince was not a member of the team's playing rotation and appeared in just 42 of 82 regular-season games. However, in the first round of the 2003 NBA playoffs, Detroit trailed the Orlando Magic three games to one, forcing Carlisle to experiment with a different rotation. Prince was inserted into the lineup and received heavy minutes. He then became the only player in NBA history to score more points in the playoffs than in the regular season (137 in the season, 141 in the playoffs).

The Pistons rallied to win the series, and Prince had a breakout performance during the decisive seventh game, scoring 20 points in 24 minutes. In the second round against the Philadelphia 76ers, Prince continued to see action and made several memorable plays, including a turnaround hook shot during the final seconds of Game 2, forcing an overtime period that the Pistons went on to win.

After the Pistons were swept by the New Jersey Nets in the Eastern Conference Finals, Carlisle was fired and former Sixers coach Larry Brown took over as head coach. Under Brown, Prince became the Pistons' starting small forward and increased his scoring average to 10.3 points per game, up from 3.3 as a rookie. In that 2003–04 season, Prince was also selected to play for the Sophomores (second-year players) in the NBA Rookie Challenge.

In Game 2 of the 2004 Eastern Conference Finals against the Indiana Pacers, Prince made a memorable defensive play. In the final minute of the game, Prince spectacularly blocked the ball from Pacers star shooting guard Reggie Miller; effectively ending the game. The Pistons went on to win the series and, eventually, the NBA championship. When the Pistons defeated the Los Angeles Lakers four games to one in the NBA Finals, Prince's tough defense on Lakers guard Kobe Bryant was credited as a key factor in the Pistons' victory, holding Bryant to only 11 points in an 88–68 win in Game 3 of the 2004 NBA Finals.

==== All-Defensive Team regular (2004–2008) ====
Prince with the Pistons in April 2008

Prince continued to show improvement in the 2004–05 season, setting career highs in scoring (14.7 points per game), rebounding (5.3 per game), assists (3.0) and blocks (0.9). He was selected for the NBA's NBA All-Defensive Second Team and was a candidate for the NBA Most Improved Player Award, where he came in third behind winner Bobby Simmons of the Los Angeles Clippers and Primož Brezec of the Charlotte Bobcats. Although he and the Pistons made it back to the NBA Finals in 2005, they lost to the San Antonio Spurs in seven games. During the Malice at the Palace brawl, Prince was the only player on either team who did not leave the bench during the entire incident.

Prince's play was rewarded by the Pistons with a five-year contract extension worth $49 million on October 31, 2005.

In the 2005–06 season, Prince played in all 82 regular season games, averaging 14.1 points and 4.2 rebounds a game. In the playoffs, the Pistons were eliminated by the Miami Heat in the Eastern Conference Finals in six games, following the controversial decision by Flip Saunders to bench Ben Wallace in game 6 entire fourth quarter. In Game 5 of that series, he scored a playoff career-high 29 points to go along with 7 rebounds in a 91–78 win.

In the 2006–07 season, Prince returned similar statistics to his 2004–05 campaign: 14.3 points, 5.2 rebounds, and 2.8 assists per game. In the playoffs the Pistons were eliminated in the Eastern Conference Finals by the Cleveland Cavaliers in six games, Prince had averages of 14.1 points, 6.4 rebounds, and 3.8 assists per game but struggled to defend LeBron James.

In the 2007–08 season, Prince played and started in all 82 regular season games, averaging 13.2 points, 4.9 rebounds, and 3.3 assists per game. In the playoffs, Prince averaged 13.8 points, 5.5 rebounds, and 3.2 assists, but the Pistons were eliminated in the Eastern Conference Finals by the Boston Celtics in game six as Prince's poor play in the game, along with Rasheed Wallace, contributed to the team's demise.

==== Later years in Detroit (2008–2013) ====
Prince started the 2008–09 season off strong while averaging nearly 16 points and seven rebounds a game. As the season progressed, his production began to slump, and by the end of the season he averaged 14.2 points and 5.8 rebounds. Although his points per game average dropped, he averaged a career high in rebounds per game. Prince's effort helped push the Pistons to the playoffs as they gained the 8th seed with 39 wins. Although the Pistons made the playoffs, they were seeded against the top-seed Cleveland Cavaliers. The Cavaliers swept the Pistons in four games, and Prince's production from the season dropped drastically, as he averaged only 3.8 points and 3.5 rebounds.

=== Memphis Grizzlies (2013–2015) ===
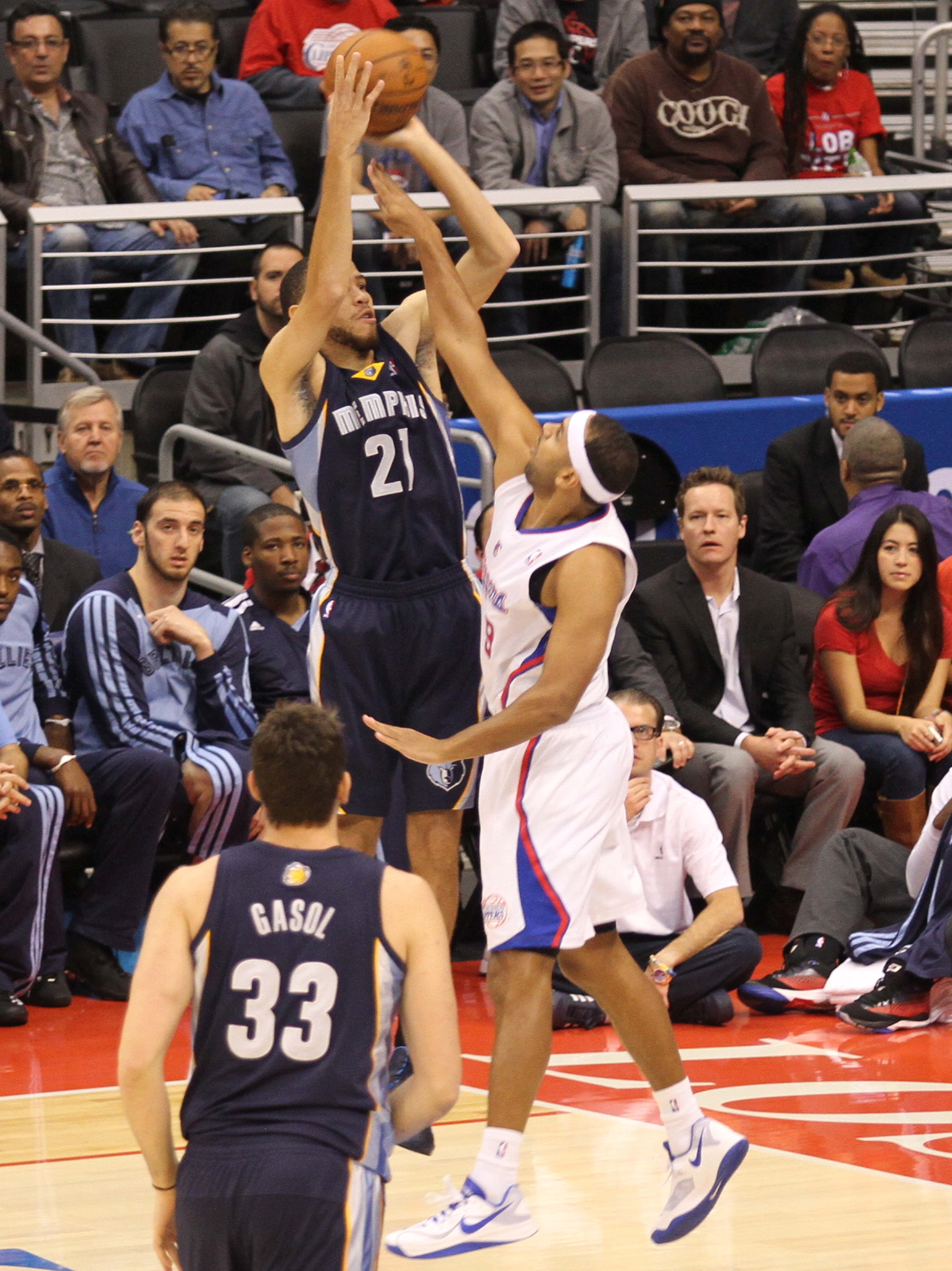
Prince with the Grizzlies

On January 30, 2013, Prince and Austin Daye were traded to the Memphis Grizzlies in a three-team trade that sent Rudy Gay and Hamed Haddadi to the Toronto Raptors and José Calderón to the Pistons. The Grizzlies also received Ed Davis. Though Rudy Gay had been the longtime starting small forward in Memphis, Prince appeared to be a better fit with the team, as his style of play complemented the team's "Grit-N-Grind" mantra. The Grizzlies finished with their best record in franchise history at 56–26, and their first-ever appearance in the Western Conference Finals.

Despite an injury sustained in pre-season, Prince still managed to start and play 76 games in 2013–14, averaging 6.0 points, 3.1 rebounds and 1.6 assists per game—the second-lowest stat line of his career behind his rookie season. His 29% from the three-point line was also a career low.

=== Boston Celtics (2015) ===
On January 12, 2015, Prince was traded to the Boston Celtics in a three-team deal involving the Memphis Grizzlies and the New Orleans Pelicans in which the Celtics also received guard Austin Rivers, who was traded to the Los Angeles Clippers three days later, and a first round draft pick. The Grizzlies received forward Jeff Green and guard Russ Smith in the trade. The Pelicans received forward Quincy Pondexter and a 2015 second round draft pick (forward Branden Dawson). On January 26, Prince made his debut for the Celtics, and in 30 minutes of action off the bench, he recorded 19 points and 5 assists to lead the Celtics to a 99–90 win over the Utah Jazz.

=== Return to Detroit (2015) ===
On February 19, 2015, Prince was traded by the Celtics back to the Pistons in exchange for Luigi Datome and Jonas Jerebko.

=== Minnesota Timberwolves (2015–2016) ===
On August 20, 2015, Prince signed with the Minnesota Timberwolves. He made his debut in the team's season opener against the Los Angeles Lakers on October 28, recording 2 points and 2 rebounds in a 112–111 win.

Prince's final NBA game was on April 11, 2016, in a 105–129 loss to the Houston Rockets where he recorded 3 assists, 2 rebounds but no points in 13 minutes of playing time.

== National team career ==
On August 20, 2007, Prince was selected to be a part of Team USA that competed at the 2007 FIBA Americas Championship, a qualifying tournament for the Beijing Olympics. With his defensive poise, he contributed in the USA's unbeaten record at the tournament held in Las Vegas and earned a spot at the 2008 Summer Olympics.

On June 23, 2008, Prince was selected for the Olympic squad along with eleven others in the hope of fulfilling the ambition of winning their first gold medal since the 2000 Summer Olympics. Team USA went on to do exactly that, going unbeaten in the tournament with Prince coming off the bench and defeating 2006 World Champion Spain in the final, living up to their "Redeem Team" moniker. Prince was named as a member of the Class of 2025 Basketball Hall of Fame as a part of the 2008 U.S. Olympic men's basketball team.

== Executive career ==
On August 15, 2017, Prince joined the Memphis Grizzlies as special assistant to general manager. On April 27, 2019, the Grizzlies promoted him to Vice President of Basketball Affairs.

== Career statistics ==
=== NBA ===
Legend
GP	Games played	GS	Games started	MPG	Minutes per game
FG%	Field goal percentage	3P%	3-point field goal percentage	FT%	Free throw percentage
RPG	Rebounds per game	APG	Assists per game	SPG	Steals per game
BPG	Blocks per game	PPG	Points per game	**Bold**	Career high
†	Won an NBA championship	*	Led the league

==== Regular season ====
Year	Team	GP	GS	MPG	FG%	3P%	FT%	RPG	APG	SPG	BPG	PPG
2002–03	Detroit	42	5	15.4	.449	.426	.647	1.1	.6	.2	.3	3.3
2003–04†	Detroit	**82**	80	32.9	.467	.363	.766	4.8	2.3	**.8**	.8	10.3
2004–05	Detroit	**82**	**82***	37.1	.487	.341	.807	5.3	3.0	.7	**.9**	**14.7**
2005–06	Detroit	**82***	**82***	35.3	.455	.350	.765	4.2	2.3	**.8**	.5	14.1
2006–07	Detroit	**82***	**82***	36.6	.460	.386	.768	5.2	2.8	.6	.7	14.3
2007–08	Detroit	**82***	**82***	32.9	.448	.363	.768	4.9	**3.3**	.5	.4	13.2
2008–09	Detroit	**82***	**82***	**37.3**	.450	.397	.778	**5.8**	3.1	.5	.6	14.2
2009–10	Detroit	49	49	34.0	.486	.370	.714	5.1	**3.3**	.7	.4	13.5
2010–11	Detroit	78	78	32.8	.473	.347	.702	4.2	2.8	.4	.5	14.1
2011–12	Detroit	63	63	33.1	.421	.356	.774	4.5	2.4	.4	.5	12.7
2012–13	Detroit	**45***	45	32.4	.444	.434	.796	4.6	2.5	.5	.3	11.7
2012–13	Memphis	**37***	36	31.7	.429	.366	.595	4.2	2.3	.7	.3	8.8
2013–14	Memphis	76	76	25.6	.407	.290	.567	3.1	1.6	.5	.3	6.0
2014–15	Memphis	26	9	24.2	.410	.455	**.833**	3.2	1.4	.3	.2	7.3
2014–15	Boston	9	0	22.0	**.559**	**.625**	**.833**	3.3	2.0	.6	.2	8.4
2014–15	Detroit	23	7	24.8	.431	.423	.660	4.2	1.7	.7	.3	7.3
2015–16	Minnesota	77	44	19.0	.445	.174	.684	1.9	1.0	.5	.2	2.9
Career		1,017	902	31.0	.455	.367	.756	4.3	2.4	.6	.5	11.1

==== Playoffs ====
Year	Team	GP	GS	MPG	FG%	3P%	FT%	RPG	APG	SPG	BPG	PPG
2003	Detroit	15	3	25.5	.426	.292	.763	3.8	1.5	.5	.9	9.4
2004†	Detroit	23	23	34.6	.410	.265	.745	6.0	2.3	**1.1**	**1.3**	9.9
2005	Detroit	**25**	**25**	40.9	.433	.367	.800	6.3	3.3	1.0	.4	13.4
2006	Detroit	18	18	41.4	.459	**.457**	**.829**	5.7	3.0	.7	.8	**16.4**
2007	Detroit	16	16	**41.6**	.415	.409	.759	**6.4**	**3.8**	.9	.3	14.1
2008	Detroit	17	17	39.5	**.481**	.320	.794	5.5	3.2	.8	.5	13.8
2009	Detroit	4	4	32.3	.259	.200	.000	3.5	1.3	.3	.0	3.8
2013	Memphis	15	15	30.3	.355	.263	.609	3.8	1.9	.5	.3	7.0
2014	Memphis	7	6	16.1	.385	.250	.000	1.4	.9	.1	.0	3.0
Career		140	127	35.6	.427	.343	.774	5.2	2.6	.8	.6	11.4

=== College ===
Year	Team	GP	GS	MPG	FG%	3P%	FT%	RPG	APG	SPG	BPG	PPG
1998–99	Kentucky	**37**	11	20.2	.414	.287	.656	3.8	1.2	.7	.6	5.8
1999–00	Kentucky	32	32	**34.0**	.423	.307	.705	6.0	1.8	.8	**1.3**	13.3
2000–01	Kentucky	34	**34**	32.9	**.495**	**.358**	**.843**	**6.5**	**2.9**	.7	1.1	16.9
2001–02	Kentucky	32	32	33.3	.467	.340	.703	6.3	1.6	**1.1**	**1.3**	**17.5**
Career		135	109	29.7	.457	.329	.743	5.6	1.9	.8	1.1	13.1

== Career highlights ==
NBA

- NBA champion (2004)
- 4× NBA All-Defensive Second Team (2005–2008)

College

- Consensus second-team All-American (2001)
- Second-team All-American – NABC (2002)
- Third-team All-American – AP (2002)
- SEC Player of the Year (2001)
- SEC tournament MVP (2001)
- 2× First-team All-SEC (2001, 2002)
- Second-team All-SEC (2000)
- SEC Tournament MVP (2001)
- SEC All-Tournament Team (2001)

High school

- McDonald's All-American (1998)
- Second-team Parade All-American (1998)
- California Mr. Basketball (1998)

Other honors

- Gold medal with U.S. national team at 2007 FIBA Americas Championship and 2008 Summer Olympics
- Southern California Basketball Hall of Fame (2022)
