= Ryan Mendez =

Ryan Mendez may refer to:

- Ryan Mendez (basketball) (born c. 1977), basketball player
- Ryan Mendez (guitarist), guitarist with Yellowcard
