= 2000–01 Georgia Bulldogs basketball team =

American college basketball season

2000–01 Georgia Bulldogs basketball

NCAA tournament, first round
- Conference: Southeastern Conference
- East
- Record: 16–15 (9–7 SEC)
- Head coach: Jim Harrick (2nd season)
- Home arena: Stegeman Coliseum

2000–01 Southeastern Conference men's basketball standings
	Conf.				Overall
Team	W		L	PCT	W		L	PCT
East
No. 8 Florida	12	–	4	.750	24	–	7	.774
No. 9 Kentucky †	12	–	4	.750	24	–	10	.706
Georgia	9	–	7	.563	16	–	15	.516
Tennessee	8	–	8	.500	22	–	11	.667
South Carolina	6	–	10	.375	15	–	15	.500
Vanderbilt	4	–	12	.250	15	–	15	.500
West
No. 14 Ole Miss	11	–	5	.688	27	–	8	.771
Arkansas	10	–	6	.625	20	–	11	.645
Alabama	8	–	8	.500	25	–	11	.694
Mississippi State	7	–	9	.438	18	–	13	.581
Auburn	7	–	9	.438	18	–	14	.563
LSU	2	–	14	.125	13	–	16	.448
† 2001 SEC tournament winner Rankings from AP Poll

The 2000–01 Georgia Bulldogs basketball team represented the University of Georgia as a member of the Southeastern Conference during the 2000–01 NCAA men's basketball season. The team was led by head coach Jim Harrick, and played their home games at Stegeman Coliseum in Athens, Georgia. The Bulldogs finished third in the SEC East standings during the regular season, were bounced early from the SEC tournament, and received a controversial at-large bid to the NCAA tournament as No. 8 seed in the East region. Georgia was beaten by No. 9 seed Missouri, 77–75, and finished the season at 16–15 (9–7 SEC).

== Roster ==
2000–01 Georgia Bulldogs men's basketball team
Players
Coaches

Pos.	#	Name	Height	Weight	Year	Hometown
G	5	Ezra Williams	6 ft 4 in (1.93 m)	230 lb (104 kg)	So	Marietta, Georgia
G	32	D. A. Layne	6 ft 0 in (1.83 m)	—	Jr

Head coach

- Jim Harrick

Assistant coach(es)

Legend

- (C) Team captain
- (S) Suspended
- (I) Ineligible
- (W) Walk-on
- Injured
- Current redshirt

== Schedule and results ==
Date time, TV	Rank^{#}	Opponent^{#}	Result	Record	Site city, state
Regular season
Nov 17, 2000*		Georgia State	L 79–91	0–1	Stegeman Coliseum; Athens, Georgia
Nov 19, 2000*		at Minnesota	L 74–77	0–2	Williams Arena; Minneapolis, Minnesota
Nov 23, 2000*		vs. Indiana State; Puerto Rico Shootout	W 82–64	1–2	Coliseo Rubén Rodríguez; Bayamón, Puerto Rico
Nov 24, 2000*		vs. No. 13 Utah; Puerto Rico Shootout	W 65–60	2–2	Coliseo Rubén Rodríguez; Bayamón, Puerto Rico
Nov 25, 2000*		vs. No. 5 Stanford; Puerto Rico Shootout	L 58–71	2–3	Coliseo Rubén Rodríguez; Bayamón, Puerto Rico
Nov 28, 2000*		Coastal Carolina	W 102–69	3–3	Stegeman Coliseum; Athens, Georgia
Dec 3, 2000*		Pepperdine	W 72–61	4–3	Stegeman Coliseum; Athens, Georgia
Dec 6, 2000*		at Georgia Tech	W 75–70	5–3	Alexander Memorial Coliseum; Atlanta, Georgia
Dec 9, 2000*		NC State; Delta Air Lines Holiday Classic	W 68–63	6–3	Atlanta, Georgia
Dec 16, 2000*		at No. 6 Wake Forest	L 57–75	6–4	Lawrence Joel Veterans Memorial Coliseum; Winston-Salem, North Carolina
Dec 21, 2000*		vs. California; Pete Newell Challenge	L 64–85	6–5	SAP Center; San Jose, California
Dec 23, 2000*		at Fresno State	L 61–80	6–6	Selland Arena; Fresno, California
Dec 28, 2000*		Villanova	W 91–80	7–6	Stegeman Coliseum; Athens, Georgia
Mar 3, 2001		at Arkansas	L 67–82	16–13 (9–7)	Bud Walton Arena; Fayetteville, Arkansas
SEC Tournament
Mar 8, 2001*		vs. LSU; First round	L 62–63	16–14	Bridgestone Arena; Nashville, Tennessee
NCAA Tournament
Mar 15, 2001*	(8 E)	vs. (9 E) Missouri; First round	L 68–70	16–15	Greensboro Coliseum; Greensboro, North Carolina
*Non-conference game. ^{#}Rankings from AP poll. (#) Tournament seedings in parentheses. E=East. All times are in Eastern Time.
