= 2000–01 Ole Miss Rebels men's basketball team =

American college basketball season

2000–01 Ole Miss Rebels men's basketball

SEC West champions

NCAA tournament, Sweet Sixteen
- Conference: Southeastern Conference

Ranking
- Coaches: No. 9
- AP: No. 14
- Record: 27–8 (11–5 SEC)
- Head coach: Rod Barnes (3rd season)
- Assistant coaches: Marc Dukes (3rd season); Eric Bozeman (3rd season); Wayne Brent (3rd season)
- Home arena: Tad Smith Coliseum

2000–01 Southeastern Conference men's basketball standings
	Conf.				Overall
Team	W		L	PCT	W		L	PCT
East
No. 8 Florida	12	–	4	.750	24	–	7	.774
No. 9 Kentucky †	12	–	4	.750	24	–	10	.706
Georgia	9	–	7	.563	16	–	15	.516
Tennessee	8	–	8	.500	22	–	11	.667
South Carolina	6	–	10	.375	15	–	15	.500
Vanderbilt	4	–	12	.250	15	–	15	.500
West
No. 14 Ole Miss	11	–	5	.688	27	–	8	.771
Arkansas	10	–	6	.625	20	–	11	.645
Alabama	8	–	8	.500	25	–	11	.694
Mississippi State	7	–	9	.438	18	–	13	.581
Auburn	7	–	9	.438	18	–	14	.563
LSU	2	–	14	.125	13	–	16	.448
† 2001 SEC tournament winner Rankings from AP Poll

The 2000–01 Ole Miss Rebels men's basketball team represented the University of Mississippi in the 2000–01 NCAA Division I men's basketball season. The Rebels were led by third-year head coach, Rod Barnes. The Rebels played their home games at Tad Smith Coliseum in Oxford, Mississippi as members of the Southeastern Conference. This season marked the sixth NCAA Tournament appearance in school history.

== Roster ==
2000–01 Ole Miss Rebels men's basketball team
Players
Coaches

Pos.	#	Name	Height	Weight	Year	Hometown
F	44	Rahim Lockhart	6 ft 8 in (2.03 m)	255 lb (116 kg)	Sr	Mendenhall, Mississippi
F	23	Justin Reed	6 ft 8 in (2.03 m)	222 lb (101 kg)	Fr	Jackson, Mississippi
G/F	5	Aaron Harper	6 ft 7 in (2.01 m)	200 lb (91 kg)	Fr	Jackson, Mississippi
G	22	Jason Flanigan	6 ft 1 in (1.85 m)	180 lb (82 kg)	Sr	Little Rock, Arkansas
G	11	Jason Harrison	5 ft 5 in (1.65 m)	155 lb (70 kg)	Jr	Little Rock, Arkansas
G	15	David Sanders	6 ft 3 in (1.91 m)	180 lb (82 kg)	So	Jackson, Michigan
G	20	Jason Holmes	6 ft 5 in (1.96 m)	205 lb (93 kg)	Sr	Tylertown, Mississippi
G	32	Emmanuel Wade	6 ft 3 in (1.91 m)	185 lb (84 kg)	So	Marianna, Arkansas
F/C	31	John Gunn	6 ft 10 in (2.08 m)	250 lb (113 kg)	So	Oxford, Michigan
F	45	Richard Kirklin	6 ft 9 in (2.06 m)	205 lb (93 kg)	So	Pine Bluff, Arkansas
F	30	Josh Hayes	6 ft 7 in (2.01 m)	195 lb (88 kg)	Fr	Little Rock, Arkansas
C	54	John Engstrom	7 ft 0 in (2.13 m)	250 lb (113 kg)	Jr	Paragould, Arkansas
G	10	John Pilger	5 ft 10 in (1.78 m)	170 lb (77 kg)	Fr	Ocean Springs, Mississippi
G	21	Carey Crain	6 ft 0 in (1.83 m)	165 lb (75 kg)	Fr	Mendenhall, Mississippi
G	24	Syniker Taylor	6 ft 1 in (1.85 m)	205 lb (93 kg)	So	Gulfport, Mississippi
F	40	Derrick Allen	6 ft 8 in (2.03 m)	220 lb (100 kg)	Jr	Gadsden, Alabama

Head coach

- Rod Barnes

Assistant coach(es)

- Marc Dukes
- Eric Bozeman
- Wayne Brent

Legend

- (C) Team captain
- (S) Suspended
- (I) Ineligible
- (W) Walk-on
- Injured
- Current redshirt

Roster

== Schedule and results ==
Date time, TV	Rank^{#}	Opponent^{#}	Result	Record	Site city, state
Non-conference regular season
Nov 18, 2000*		Arkansas-Pine Bluff	W 98–47	1–0	Tad Smith Coliseum; Oxford, Mississippi
Nov 22, 2000*		Sam Houston State	W 71–65	2–0	Tad Smith Coliseum; Oxford, Mississippi
Nov 25, 2000*		at VCU	W 88–84 ^{OT}	3–0	Siegel Center; Richmond, Virginia
Nov 28, 2000*		Louisiana-Monroe	W 76–62	4–0	Tad Smith Coliseum; Oxford, Mississippi
Dec 2, 2000*		No. 14 Oklahoma	W 60–55	5–0	Tad Smith Coliseum; Oxford, Mississippi
Dec 5, 2000*		Kansas State	W 60–46	6–0	Tad Smith Coliseum; Oxford, Mississippi
Dec 9, 2000*		at Memphis	W 64–56	7–0	The Pyramid; Memphis, Tennessee
Dec 13, 2000*	No. 23	Southeastern Louisiana	W 58–46	8–0	Tad Smith Coliseum; Oxford, Mississippi
Dec 18, 2000*	No. 24	Troy State	W 92–65	9–0	Tad Smith Coliseum; Oxford, Mississippi
Dec 21, 2000*	No. 24	vs. Southern Illinois; Yahoo Sports Invitational	W 70–66	10–0	Cannon Activities Center; Laie, Hawaii
Dec 22, 2000*	No. 24	vs. No. 13 USC; Yahoo Sports Invitational	W 84–83 ^{OT}	11–0	Cannon Activities Center; Laie, Hawaii
Dec 23, 2000*	No. 24	vs. Iowa State; Yahoo Sports Invitational	L 68–73	11–1	Cannon Activities Center; Laie, Hawaii
Dec 30, 2000*	No. 24	Morris Brown	W 94–59	12–1	Tad Smith Coliseum; Oxford, Mississippi
SEC regular season
Jan 6, 2001	No. 22	at Vanderbilt	W 81–68	13–1 (1–0)	Memorial Gymnasium; Nashville, Tennessee
Jan 10, 2001	No. 20	at Arkansas	W 53–48	14–1 (2–0)	Bud Walton Arena (18,419); Fayetteville, Arkansas
Jan 13, 2001	No. 20	Georgia	L 66–70	14–2 (2–1)	Tad Smith Coliseum; Oxford, Mississippi
Jan 17, 2001	No. 21	at No. 15 Alabama	L 63–82	14–3 (2–2)	Coleman Coliseum; Tuscaloosa, Alabama
Jan 20, 2001	No. 21	Kentucky	W 65–55	15–3 (3–2)	Tad Smith Coliseum; Oxford, Mississippi
Jan 27, 2001	No. 19	at Mississippi State	L 69–79	15–4 (3–3)	Humphrey Coliseum; Starkville, Mississippi
Jan 31, 2001		Arkansas	W 84–73	16–4 (4–3)	Tad Smith Coliseum; Oxford, Mississippi
Feb 3, 2001		at Auburn	W 74–70	17–4 (5–3)	Beard-Eaves-Memorial Coliseum; Auburn, Alabama
Feb 7, 2001	No. 25	LSU	W 50–33	18–4 (6–3)	Tad Smith Coliseum; Oxford, Mississippi
Feb 10, 2001	No. 25	No. 10 Tennessee	W 87–71	19–4 (7–3)	Tad Smith Coliseum; Oxford, Mississippi
Feb 14, 2001	No. 16	Mississippi State	W 51–48	20–4 (8–3)	Tad Smith Coliseum; Oxford, Mississippi
Feb 17, 2001	No. 16	at South Carolina	W 67–61	21–4 (9–3)	Carolina Coliseum; Columbia, South Carolina
Feb 21, 2001	No. 12	at No. 7 Florida	L 55–75	21–5 (9–4)	Stephen C. O'Connell Center; Gainesville, Florida
Feb 24, 2001	No. 12	Auburn	W 64–62	22–5 (10–4)	Tad Smith Coliseum; Oxford, Mississippi
Feb 28, 2001	No. 14	at LSU	L 77–78 ^{OT}	22–6 (10–5)	Maravich Assembly Center; Baton Rouge, Louisiana
Mar 3, 2001	No. 14	No. 20 Alabama	W 105–71	23–6 (11–5)	Tad Smith Coliseum; Oxford, Mississippi
SEC tournament
Mar 9, 2001*	(1 W) No. 14	vs. (4 E) Tennessee; Quarterfinals	W 86–73	24–6	Bridgestone Arena; Nashville, Tennessee
Mar 10, 2001*	(1 W) No. 14	vs. (2 E) No. 5 Florida; Semifinals	W 74–69	25–6	Bridgestone Arena; Nashville, Tennessee
Mar 11, 2001*	(1 W) No. 14	vs. (1 E) No. 15 Kentucky; Championship game	L 55–77	25–7	Bridgestone Arena; Nashville, Tennessee
NCAA tournament
Mar 16, 2001*	(3 MW) No. 14	vs. (14 MW) Iona; First round	W 72–70	26–7	Kemper Arena; Kansas City, Missouri
Mar 18, 2001*	(3 MW) No. 14	vs. (6 MW) No. 19 Notre Dame; Second Round	W 59–56	27–7	Kemper Arena; Kansas City, Missouri
Mar 23, 2001*	(3 MW) No. 14	vs. (2 MW) No. 5 Arizona; Regional semifinal – Sweet Sixteen	L 56–66	27–8	Alamodome; San Antonio, Texas
*Non-conference game. ^{#}Rankings from AP Poll. (#) Tournament seedings in parentheses. MW=Midwest. All times are in Central Time.
