= 2001 National Invitation Tournament =

Annual NCAA basketball competition

- Season: 2000–01
- Teams: 32
- Finals site: Madison Square Garden, New York City
- Champions: Tulsa Golden Hurricane (2nd title)
- Runner-up: Alabama Crimson Tide (1st title game)
- Semifinalists: Memphis Tigers (2nd semifinal); Detroit Titans (1st semifinal)
- Winning coach: Buzz Peterson (1st title)
- MVP: Marcus Hill (Tulsa)

The 2001 National Invitation Tournament was the 2001 edition of the annual NCAA college basketball competition.

== Selected teams ==
Below is a list of the 32 teams selected for the tournament.

School	Conference	Record	Appearance	Last bid
Alabama	SEC	21–10	9th	1999
Auburn	SEC	17–13	5th	1998
Baylor	Big 12	19–11	3rd	1990
Bradley	Missouri Valley	19–11	20th	1999
Connecticut	Big East	19–11	11th	1997
Dayton	Atlantic 10	19–12	19th	1998
Detroit	MCC	22–10	5th	1978
Illinois State	Missouri Valley	21–8	8th	1996
McNeese State	Southland	22–8	2nd	1986
Memphis	C-USA	17–14	14th	1998
Miami (FL)	Big East	16–12	6th	1997
Minnesota	Big Ten	17–13	9th	1998
Mississippi State	SEC	16–12	5th	1999
New Mexico	Mountain West	19–12	15th	2000
Pepperdine	West Coast	21–8	6th	1999
Pittsburgh	Big East	18–13	8th	1997
Purdue	Big Ten	16–14	7th	1992
Richmond	Colonial	21–6	5th	1992
Seton Hall	Big East	16–14	14th	1999
South Alabama	Sun Belt	22–10	3rd	1984
South Carolina	SEC	15–14	5th	1999
Southern Miss	C-USA	22–8	8th	1998
St. Bonaventure	Atlantic 10	18–11	14th	1998
Toledo	MAC	21–10	5th	1999
Tulsa	WAC	21–11	7th	1991
UC Irvine	Big West	25–4	3rd	1986
UNC Wilmington	Colonial	19–10	2nd	1998
Utah	Mountain West	19–11	11th	1992
UTEP	WAC	22–8	7th	1995
Villanova	Big East	18–12	14th	2000
West Virginia	Big East	17–11	13th	1997
Wyoming	Mountain West	20–9	7th	1999

== Bracket ==
Below are the four first round brackets, along with the four-team championship bracket:

First Round
(H)	Connecticut	72
South Carolina	65
Detroit	68
(H)	Bradley	49
(H)	Richmond	79
West Virginia	56
(H)	Dayton	68
UNC Wilmington	59

Second Round
(H)	Connecticut	61
Detroit	67
Richmond	56
(H)	Dayton	71

Quarterfinals
Detroit	59
(H)	Dayton	42

First Round
(H)	Alabama	85
Seton Hall	79
(H)	Toledo	76*
South Alabama	67
(H)	Purdue	90
Illinois State	79
(H)	Auburn	60
Miami (FL)	58

Second Round
(H)	Alabama	79
Toledo	69
(H)	Purdue	90
Auburn	60

Quarterfinals
Alabama	85**
(H)	Purdue	77

First Round
(H)	Minnesota	87
Villanova	78
(H)	Tulsa	75
UC Irvine	71
(H)	Pittsburgh	84
St. Bonaventure	75
(H)	Mississippi State	75
Southern Miss	68

Second Round
(H)	Minnesota	70
Tulsa	73*
(H)	Pittsburgh	61
Mississippi State	66

Quarterfinals
Tulsa	77
(H)	Mississippi State	75

First Round
Pepperdine	72
(H)	Wyoming	69
(H)	New Mexico	83
Baylor	73
(H)	UTEP	84
McNeese State	74
Memphis	71
(H)	Utah	62

Second Round
Pepperdine	75
(H)	New Mexico	81
UTEP	65
(H)	Memphis	90

Quarterfinals
New Mexico	63
(H)	Memphis	81

=== Semifinals & finals ===
Semifinals
Detroit	63
Alabama	74
Tulsa	72
Memphis	64

Finals
Alabama	66
Tulsa	79

Third place game
Detroit	71
Memphis	86

- Overtime (H) Home

== See also ==
- 2001 Women's National Invitation Tournament
- 2001 NCAA Division I men's basketball tournament
- 2001 NCAA Division II men's basketball tournament
- 2001 NCAA Division III men's basketball tournament
- 2001 NCAA Division I women's basketball tournament
- 2001 NAIA Division I men's basketball tournament
- 2001 NAIA Division II men's basketball tournament
