= Marvin O'Connor (basketball) =

American basketball player

Personal information
- Born: July 11, 1978 (age 48) Philadelphia, Pennsylvania, U.S.
- Listed height: 6 ft 4 in (1.93 m)
- Listed weight: 200 lb (91 kg)

Career information
- High school: Simon Gratz (Philadelphia, Pennsylvania)
- College: Villanova (1997–1998); Saint Joseph's (1999–2002)
- NBA draft: 2002: undrafted
- Playing career: 2002–2003
- Position: Shooting guard

Career history
- 2002–2003: Partizan

Career highlights
- YUBA League champion (2003); Robert V. Geasey Trophy (2001); First-team All-Atlantic 10 (2001); Second-team All-Atlantic 10 (2002); Third-team All-Atlantic 10 (2000)

Marvin O'Connor (born July 11, 1978) is an American former professional basketball player. He played high school basketball at Simon Gratz in his native Philadelphia, winning the Philadelphia Public League title as a senior in 1997. After his freshman year in college at Villanova, O'Connor transferred to Saint Joseph's, where he was an all-conference selection in all of his three seasons there, and won the Robert V. Geasey Trophy as the best basketball player in the Philadelphia Big 5 in 2001. He went undrafted in the 2002 NBA draft and spent his only professional season with KK Partizan in Serbia, playing in the 2002–03 Euroleague. He is a member of the St. Joseph's Hawks Hall of Fame (inducted in 2008) and of the Big 5 Hall of Fame (2013).

== High school career ==
O'Connor was born in Philadelphia, Pennsylvania in 1978, to Alfred and Alexandria Dockins. He attended Simon Gratz High School, where he was named a starter as a sophomore in 1994–95 by coach Bill Ellerbee. That season, he scored a season-high 20 points against Central. In the following season, his junior year, O'Connor was one of the main players on the team, and was the team's top scorer in 11 out of 14 regular season games in the Philadelphia Public League. He scored a regular season-best 24 points against Roxborough, 29 points in the semifinals against Frankford and 35 points (a then-career high) against Thomas Edison High School. At the end of the season he was named in the All-City Second Team and in the All-Public League First Team after averaging 15.6 points per game in Public League play. Overall, O'Connor averaged 17 points, 9 rebounds and 3 assists per game in a total of 28 games in his junior season.

In O'Connor's senior season, he led the team in scoring in 10 out of 16 games during the Public League, including 39 points against Olney (a new career-high), 34 against Fels and 30 against Northeast. During the playoffs, O'Connor scored 22 points in the semifinals against Strawberry Mansion, and 14 points, along with 13 rebounds, in the championship game win against Engineering and Science, which was led by Lynn Greer. At the end of the year, O'Connor was named in the All-Public League and All-City First Teams, after averaging 23.7 points per game. The Philadelphia Inquirer named him City Player of the Year. O'Connor scored a total 1,258 points at Simon Gratz.

== College career ==
O'Connor was highly recruited in high school and received offers from several NCAA Division I programs, drawing interest from Clemson, Xavier, NC State, Miami (FL), Penn, Penn State, Princeton, Temple, UMass, and Villanova. He signed to play for Villanova in late November 1996. As a true freshman at Villanova, O'Connor found little playing time under coach Steve Lappas, starting 5 out of 21 games, and scoring a season-high 12 points against Temple. At the end of the season he had averages of 4.7 points, 1.7 rebounds and 1.2 assists per game.

After the end of his first season at Villanova, O'Connor decided to transfer to Saint Joseph's. He had to sit out the 1998–99 season due to NCAA transfer rules. He debuted for Saint Joseph's in 1999. Head coach Phil Martelli immediately included O'Connor in the starting lineup, and he averaged 16.6 points, 4.4 rebounds, 2.6 assists and 1.1 steals per game in 31.5 minutes of playing time. He led the team in points per game (16.6), steals with 31 (1.1 average), three-pointers made (73) and ranked second in assists per game behind Tim Brown. He scored in double figures in 25 out of 28 games, being the team's top scorer in 18 of these occasions, and at the end of his first year at Saint Joseph's he was named in the All-Atlantic 10 Third Team and in the All-Big 5 First Team.

In O'Connor's junior season he was joined in the backcourt by freshman point guard Jameer Nelson. O'Connor was the leading scorer of the team throughout the season, leading the team in 24 out of 32 appearances. On December 11, 2000, O'Connor scored a new career-high 32 points on 11/17 shooting against his former team, Villanova: the game ended with Saint Joseph's losing, 75–78. On March 3, 2001, O'Connor scored 18 points in 57.5 seconds, reaching a new career-high of 37 points in a game against La Salle. The Hawks qualified for the 2001 NCAA tournament, where O'Connor debuted scoring 21 points against Georgia Tech. On March 17, 2000, he scored 37 points (equalling his career high) against Stanford shooting 15/20 from the field, including a perfect 10/10 on 2-point field goals. The performance was the highest-scoring game of the NCAA Tournament that season. At the end of the season he was ranked 10th in the entire NCAA in scoring at 22.1 points per game and he received several accolades: he was named in the All-Atlantic 10 First Team, All-Big 5 First Team, NABC All-District First Team, and he received the Robert V. Geasey Trophy as the best basketball player in the Philadelphia Big 5. His 706 points in the 2000–01 season are an all-time record at Saint Joseph's.

O'Connor was named in the preseason watchlist for the John R. Wooden Award before the beginning of his senior year. He also received nomination in All-American teams selected by The Sporting News and Playboy. On December 21, 2001, he scored 33 points, a season high, against Georgia State. In December 2001 he was included in the Midseason Top 30 list for the Wooden Award. He scored at least 10 points in 26 out of 29 games, and in 8 of these he scored more than 20 points. He was the team's leading scorer for the third season in a row and he was named in the All-Atlantic 10 Second Team, the All-Big 5 First Team, and in the NABC All-District First Team. He ended his career at Saint Joseph's with a total of 1,678 points (14th in program history as of 2018) and 231 three-point field goals made, which at the time of his graduation were the highest mark in Saint Joseph's history (4th as of 2018). He started all the 89 games he played with the Hawks.

In 2008 he was inducted in the Saint Joseph's Hall of Fame, and in 2013 he was inducted in the Big 5 Hall of Fame.

=== College statistics ===
Year	Team	GP	GS	MPG	FG%	3P%	FT%	RPG	APG	SPG	BPG	PPG
1997–98	Villanova	21	5	15.6	.354	.217	.357	1.7	1.2	0.5	0.0	4.7
1998–99	Saint Joseph's	Did not play – transfer										
1999–00	Saint Joseph's	28	28	31.6	.408	.354	.736	4.4	2.6	1.1	0.1	16.6
2000–01	Saint Joseph's	32	32	33.5	.465	.374	.676	3.7	2.6	1.1	0.0	22.1
2001–02	Saint Joseph's	29	29	33.0	.429	.286	.717	4.2	2.5	0.6	0.0	17.5
Career		110	94	29.5	.430	.331	.692	3.6	2.3	0.9	0.0	16.1

== Professional career ==
After the end of his senior season at Saint Joseph's, O'Connor was automatically eligible for the 2002 NBA draft. After playing in the Portsmouth Invitational Tournament, O'Connor went undrafted. He played in the 2002 Shaw's Pro Summer League with the Orlando Magic. After a brief tryout with Italian Serie A team Virtus Bologna, O'Connor signed a professional contract with KK Partizan in Belgrade, Serbia. He played 11 games in the YUBA League, averaging 6.3 points, 1.9 rebounds and 0.9 assists in 17 minutes per game. He also played in 10 Euroleague games during the 2002–03 season, posting averages of 4.1 points, 1.6 rebounds and 1 assist per game in 14.4 minutes of playing time.
