= 2000–01 Tennessee Volunteers basketball team =

American college basketball season

2000–01 Tennessee Volunteers basketball

NCAA tournament, Second round
- Conference: Southeastern Conference
- East
- Record: 22–11 (8–8 SEC)
- Head coach: Jerry Green (4th season)
- Home arena: Thompson–Boling Arena

2000–01 Southeastern Conference men's basketball standings
	Conf.				Overall
Team	W		L	PCT	W		L	PCT
East
No. 8 Florida	12	–	4	.750	24	–	7	.774
No. 9 Kentucky †	12	–	4	.750	24	–	10	.706
Georgia	9	–	7	.563	16	–	15	.516
Tennessee	8	–	8	.500	22	–	11	.667
South Carolina	6	–	10	.375	15	–	15	.500
Vanderbilt	4	–	12	.250	15	–	15	.500
West
No. 14 Ole Miss	11	–	5	.688	27	–	8	.771
Arkansas	10	–	6	.625	20	–	11	.645
Alabama	8	–	8	.500	25	–	11	.694
Mississippi State	7	–	9	.438	18	–	13	.581
Auburn	7	–	9	.438	18	–	14	.563
LSU	2	–	14	.125	13	–	16	.448
† 2001 SEC tournament winner Rankings from AP Poll

The 2000–01 Tennessee Volunteers basketball team represented the University of Tennessee during the 2000–01 NCAA Division I men's basketball season. The team was led by fourth-year head coach Jerry Green, and played their home games at Thompson–Boling Arena in Knoxville, Tennessee as a member of the Southeastern Conference. After finishing with an 8–8 conference record, they were invited to the NCAA tournament where they were beaten in the opening round by Charlotte, 70–63.

== Roster ==
2000–01 Tennessee Volunteers men's basketball team
Players
Coaches

Pos.	#	Name	Height	Weight	Year	Previous school	Hometown
G	2	Jenis Grindstaff	6 ft 2 in (1.88 m)	—	Jr	-	Spruce Pine, North Carolina
G	5	Harris Walker	6 ft 1 in (1.85 m)	—	So	Hargrave Military Academy	Chattanooga, Tennessee
F	12	Marcus Haislip	6 ft 10 in (2.08 m)	—	So	Marshall County	Lewisburg, Tennessee
G	14	Tony Harris	6 ft 0 in (1.83 m)	—	Sr	East	Memphis, Tennessee
F	22	Vincent Yarbrough	6 ft 7 in (2.01 m)	—	Jr	Cleveland	Cleveland, Tennessee
F	30	Zach Turner	6 ft 7 in (2.01 m)	—	So	Christian	Charlotte, North Carolina
G	31	Terrence Woods	6 ft 3 in (1.91 m)	—	So	Treadwell	Memphis, Tennessee
G	32	Del Baker	6 ft 5 in (1.96 m)	—	Sr	Cleveland	Cleveland, Tennessee
C	33	Brandon Crump	6 ft 10 in (2.08 m)	—	Fr	Klein	Houston, Texas
F	34	Andy Ikeakor	6 ft 8 in (2.03 m)	—	Fr	Westbury Christian	Houston, Texas
F	35	Ron Slay	6 ft 8 in (2.03 m)	235 lb (107 kg)	So	Oak Hill Academy	Nashville, Tennessee
G	42	Jon Higgins	6 ft 3 in (1.91 m)	—	So	Shaker Heights	Shaker Heights, Ohio
F	44	Isiah Victor	6 ft 9 in (2.06 m)	—	Sr	University Heights	Hopkinsville, Kentucky
C	55	Charles Hathaway	6 ft 10 in (2.08 m)	—	Sr	Hillwood HS	Nashville, Tennessee

Head coach

- Jerry Green

Assistant coach(es)

Legend

- (C) Team captain
- (S) Suspended
- (I) Ineligible
- (W) Walk-on
- Injured
- Current redshirt

Roster

== Schedule and results ==
Date time, TV	Rank^{#}	Opponent^{#}	Result	Record	Site (attendance) city, state
Regular season
Nov 17, 2000*	No. 9	Chattanooga	W 88–66	1–0	Thompson-Boling Arena; Knoxville, Tennessee
Nov 19, 2000*	No. 9	East Tennessee State	W 102–76	2–0	Thompson-Boling Arena; Knoxville, Tennessee
Nov 21, 2000*	No. 9	No. 18 Wisconsin	W 66–56	3–0	Thompson-Boling Arena; Knoxville, Tennessee
Nov 27, 2000*	No. 7	Austin Peay	W 98–65	4–0	Thompson-Boling Arena; Knoxville, Tennessee
Nov 30, 2000*	No. 7	UNC Asheville	W 85–59	5–0	Thompson-Boling Arena; Knoxville, Tennessee
Dec 2, 2000*	No. 7	at West Virginia	W 79–78	6–0	WVU Coliseum; Morgantown, West Virginia
Dec 5, 2000*	No. 6	Memphis	W 86–76	7–0	Thompson-Boling Arena; Knoxville, Tennessee
Dec 7, 2000*	No. 6	SMU	W 85–76	8–0	Thompson-Boling Arena; Knoxville, Tennessee
Dec 15, 2000*	No. 4	Middle Tennessee	W 99–83	9–0	Thompson-Boling Arena; Knoxville, Tennessee
Dec 19, 2000*	No. 4	vs. No. 14 Virginia; Jimmy V Classic	L 89–107	9–1	Continental Airlines Arena; East Rutherford, New Jersey
Dec 22, 2000*	No. 4	at No. 12 Syracuse	W 83–70	10–1	Carrier Dome (23,164); Syracuse, New York
Dec 28, 2000*	No. 6	vs. George Washington; Rainbow Classic	W 92–81	11–1	Stan Sheriff Center; Honolulu, Hawaii
Dec 29, 2000*	No. 6	vs. No. 23 Iowa; Rainbow Classic	W 80–68	12–1	Stan Sheriff Center; Honolulu, Hawaii
Dec 30, 2000*	No. 6	at Hawaii; Rainbow Classic	W 69–58	13–1	Stan Sheriff Center (8,291); Honolulu, Hawaii
Jan 6, 2001	No. 6	at Auburn	W 96–88 ^{2OT}	14–1 (1–0)	Beard–Eaves–Memorial Coliseum; Auburn, Alabama
Jan 9, 2001	No. 4	No. 16 Alabama	W 86–69	15–1 (2–0)	Thompson-Boling Arena; Knoxville, Tennessee
Jan 13, 2001	No. 4	South Carolina	W 79–71	16–1 (3–0)	Thompson-Boling Arena; Knoxville, Tennessee
Jan 16, 2001	No. 4	Kentucky	L 74–84	16–2 (3–1)	Rupp Arena; Lexington, Kentucky
Jan 20, 2001	No. 4	Mississippi State	W 84–79	17–2 (4–1)	Thompson-Boling Arena; Knoxville, Tennessee
Jan 27, 2001	No. 6	at Georgia	L 75–77 ^{2OT}	17–3 (4–2)	Stegeman Coliseum; Athens, Georgia
Jan 30, 2001	No. 8	at No. 13 Florida	L 67–81	17–4 (4–3)	O'Connell Center; Gainesville, Florida
Feb 3, 2001	No. 8	Vanderbilt	W 72–50	18–4 (5–3)	Thompson-Boling Arena; Knoxville, Tennessee
Feb 7, 2001	No. 8	at Arkansas	L 77–82 ^{OT}	18–5 (5–4)	Bud Walton Arena (19,684); Fayetteville, Arkansas
Feb 10, 2001	No. 10	at No. 25 Ole Miss	L 71–87	18–6 (5–5)	Tad Smith Coliseum; Oxford, Mississippi
Feb 14, 2001	No. 15	No. 22 Kentucky	L 95–103	18–7 (5–6)	Thompson-Boling Arena; Knoxville, Tennessee
Feb 18, 2001	No. 15	No. 11 Florida	L 82–88	18–8 (5–7)	Thompson-Boling Arena; Knoxville, Tennessee
Feb 21, 2001	No. 22	Georgia	L 76–88	18–9 (5–8)	Thompson-Boling Arena; Knoxville, Tennessee
Feb 24, 2001	No. 22	at Vanderbilt	W 78–70	19–9 (6–8)	Memorial Gymnasium; Nashville, Tennessee
Feb 27, 2001		at South Carolina	W 68–67 ^{OT}	20–9 (7–8)	Carolina Coliseum; Columbia, South Carolina
Mar 3, 2001		LSU	W 78–71	21–9 (8–8)	Thompson-Boling Arena; Knoxville, Tennessee
SEC tournament
Mar 8, 2001*		vs. Auburn; First round	W 73–66 ^{OT}	22–9	Bridgestone Arena; Nashville, Tennessee
Mar 9, 2001*		vs. No. 14 Ole Miss; Quarterfinals	L 73–86	22–10	Bridgestone Arena; Nashville, Tennessee
NCAA tournament
Mar 16, 2001*	(8 MW)	vs. (9 MW) Charlotte; First round	L 63–70	22–11	University of Dayton Arena; Dayton, Ohio
*Non-conference game. ^{#}Rankings from AP poll. (#) Tournament seedings in parentheses. MW=Midwest. All times are in Eastern Time.
