= 2000–01 Alabama Crimson Tide men's basketball team =

American college basketball season

2000–01 Alabama Crimson Tide men's basketball

NIT, runner-up
- Conference: Southeastern Conference
- Record: 25–11 (8–8 SEC)
- Head coach: Mark Gottfried (3rd season)
- Assistant coaches: Philip Pearson; Tom Kelsey; Johnny Jones
- Home arena: Coleman Coliseum

2000–01 Southeastern Conference men's basketball standings
	Conf.				Overall
Team	W		L	PCT	W		L	PCT
East
No. 8 Florida	12	–	4	.750	24	–	7	.774
No. 9 Kentucky †	12	–	4	.750	24	–	10	.706
Georgia	9	–	7	.563	16	–	15	.516
Tennessee	8	–	8	.500	22	–	11	.667
South Carolina	6	–	10	.375	15	–	15	.500
Vanderbilt	4	–	12	.250	15	–	15	.500
West
No. 14 Ole Miss	11	–	5	.688	27	–	8	.771
Arkansas	10	–	6	.625	20	–	11	.645
Alabama	8	–	8	.500	25	–	11	.694
Mississippi State	7	–	9	.438	18	–	13	.581
Auburn	7	–	9	.438	18	–	14	.563
LSU	2	–	14	.125	13	–	16	.448
† 2001 SEC tournament winner Rankings from AP Poll

The 2000–01 Alabama Crimson Tide men's basketball team represented the University of Alabama in the 2000–01 NCAA Division I men's basketball season. The team was led by third-year head coach Mark Gottfried and played its home games at Coleman Coliseum in Tuscaloosa, Alabama as a member of the Southeastern Conference. They finished the season 25–11, 8–8 in SEC play, which placed them in fourth place in the SEC Western Division. They defeated Vanderbilt to advance to the quarterfinals of the SEC tournament where they lost to Florida. They received an invitation to the National Invitation Tournament where they advanced all the way to the championship game before they lost to Tulsa.

== Schedule and results ==
Date time, TV	Rank^{#}	Opponent^{#}	Result	Record	Site city, state
Exhibition
November 8, 2000*		Global Sports	W 63–57	-	Coleman Coliseum; Tuscaloosa, AL
November 15, 2000*		Athletes in Action	W 95–87	-	Coleman Coliseum; Tuscaloosa, AL
Regular season
November 20, 2000*		Troy	W 92–64	1–0	Coleman Coliseum; Tuscaloosa, AL
November 25, 2000*; 7:00 pm		Arkansas–Pine Bluff	W 110–53	2–0	Coleman Coliseum; Tuscaloosa, AL
November 30, 2000*; 7:00 pm		Louisville	W 100–71	3–0	Coleman Coliseum; Tuscaloosa, AL
December 4, 2000*; 7:00 pm		Grambling State	W 107–61	4–0	Coleman Coliseum; Tuscaloosa, AL
December 7, 2000*; 7:00 pm	No. 23	Wofford	W 68–64	5–0	Coleman Coliseum; Tuscaloosa, AL
December 9, 2000*; 7:30 pm	No. 23	vs. Akron; Arby's Holiday Hardwood Classic	W 73–59	6–0	BJCC Arena; Birmingham, AL
December 16, 2000*; 9:05 pm	No. 18	vs. North Texas	W 94–55	7–0	Coleman Coliseum; Tuscaloosa, AL
December 20, 2000*; 3:00 pm	No. 17	vs. Northern Iowa; Puerto Rico Holiday Classic Quarterfinals	W 64–56	8–0	Guerra Sports Complex; San Juan, PR
December 21, 2000*; 3:00 pm	No. 17	vs. Washington; Puerto Rico Holiday Classic Semifinals	W 69–60	9–0	Guerra Sports Complex; San Juan, PR
December 22, 2000*; 6:00 pm	No. 17	vs. No. 22 Cincinnati; Puerto Rico Holiday Classic Championship Game	L 74–77 ^{OT}	9–1	Guerra Sports Complex; San Juan, PR
December 30, 2000*; 7:30 pm	No. 20	Alabama State	W 82–56	10–1	Coleman Coliseum; Tuscaloosa, AL
January 2, 2000*	No. 18	Southeastern Louisiana	W 92–63	11–1	Coleman Coliseum; Tuscaloosa, AL
January 6, 2001; 12:30 pm, JP Sports	No. 18	at LSU	W 82–73	12–1 (1–0)	Pete Maravich Assembly Center; Baton Rouge, LA
January 9, 2001	No. 16	at No. 4 Tennessee	L 69–86	12–2 (1–1)	Thompson–Boling Arena; Knoxville, TN
January 13, 2001; 5:00 pm	No. 16	Mississippi State	W 72–59	13–2 (2–1)	Coleman Coliseum; Tuscaloosa, AL
January 17, 2001; 7:00 pm, JP Sports	No. 15	No. 21 Ole Miss	W 82–63	14–2 (3–1)	Coleman Coliseum; Tuscaloosa, AL
January 20, 2001; 4:00 pm	No. 15	at Arkansas	L 58–87	14–3 (3–2)	Bud Walton Arena; Fayetteville, AR
January 23, 2001; 8:00 pm, ESPN	No. 18	Kentucky	W 70–60	15–3 (4–2)	Coleman Coliseum; Tuscaloosa, AL
January 27, 2001; 7:00 pm	No. 18	Auburn; Iron Bowl of Basketball	W 81–80	16–3 (5–2)	Coleman Coliseum; Tuscaloosa, AL
January 31, 2001	No. 17	at Vanderbilt	L 62–68	16–4 (5–3)	Memorial Gymnasium; Nashville, TN
February 3, 2001; 7:00 pm	No. 17	LSU	W 76–68	17–4 (6–3)	Coleman Coliseum; Tuscaloosa, AL
February 7, 2001; 7:00 pm	No. 18	at Mississippi State	L 70–84	17–5 (6–4)	Humphrey Coliseum; Starkville, MS
February 10, 2001; 7:00 pm	No. 18	Georgia	W 76–68	18–5 (7–4)	Coleman Coliseum; Tuscaloosa, AL
February 14, 2001; 7:00 pm	No. 21	South Carolina	W 60–55	19–5 (8–4)	Coleman Coliseum; Tuscaloosa, AL
February 17, 2001*; 3:00 pm, CBS	No. 21	Ohio State	W 85–67	20–5	Coleman Coliseum; Tuscaloosa, AL
February 21, 2001; 7:00 pm	No. 14	at Auburn; Iron Bowl of Basketball	L 69–72 ^{OT}	20–6 (8–5)	Beard-Eaves-Memorial Coliseum; Auburn, AL
February 24, 2001; 12:00 pm, JP Sports	No. 14	at No. 7 Florida	L 68–89	20–7 (8–6)	Stephen C. O'Connell Center; Gainesville, FL
February 28, 2001; 7:00 pm	No. 20	Arkansas	L 63–66	20–8 (8–7)	Coleman Coliseum; Tuscaloosa, AL
March 3, 2001; 3:00 pm, JP Sports	No. 20	at No. 14 Ole Miss	L 71–105	20–9 (8–8)	The Pavilion at Ole Miss; Oxford, MS
SEC tournament
March 8, 2001; JP Sports	(W3)	vs. (E6) Vanderbilt; First Round	W 78–59	21–9	Bridgestone Arena; Nashville, TN
March 9, 2001; 6:30 pm, JP Sports	(W3)	vs. (E2) No. 5 Florida; Quarterfinals	L 61–69	21–10	Bridgestone Arena; Nashville, TN
National Invitation tournament
March 13, 2001*		Seton Hall; First Round	W 85–79	22–10	Coleman Coliseum; Tuscaloosa, AL
March 20, 2001*		Toledo; Second Round	W 79–69	23–10	Coleman Coliseum; Tuscaloosa, AL
March 23, 2001*; 6:00 pm		at Purdue; Quarterfinals	W 85–77 ^{2OT}	24–10	Mackey Arena; West Lafayette, IN
March 27, 2001*; 6:00 pm, ESPN		vs. Detroit; Semifinals	W 74–63	25–10	Madison Square Garden; New York City, NY
March 29, 2001*; 6:00 pm, ESPN		vs. Tulsa; Championship	L 60–79	25–11	Madison Square Garden; New York City, NY
*Non-conference game. ^{#}Rankings from AP Poll. (#) Tournament seedings in parentheses. All times are in Central Time.
