= 2000–01 Florida Gators men's basketball team =

American college basketball season

2000–01 Florida Gators men's basketball

SEC Regular Season Co-Champions

NCAA tournament, Round of 32
- Conference: Southeastern Conference
- East

Ranking
- Coaches: No. 13
- AP: No. 8
- Record: 24–7 (12–4 SEC)
- Head coach: Billy Donovan (5th season)
- Assistant coach: John Pelphrey; Anthony Grant; Donnie Jones
- Home arena: O'Connell Center

2000–01 Southeastern Conference men's basketball standings
	Conf.				Overall
Team	W		L	PCT	W		L	PCT
East
No. 8 Florida	12	–	4	.750	24	–	7	.774
No. 9 Kentucky †	12	–	4	.750	24	–	10	.706
Georgia	9	–	7	.563	16	–	15	.516
Tennessee	8	–	8	.500	22	–	11	.667
South Carolina	6	–	10	.375	15	–	15	.500
Vanderbilt	4	–	12	.250	15	–	15	.500
West
No. 14 Ole Miss	11	–	5	.688	27	–	8	.771
Arkansas	10	–	6	.625	20	–	11	.645
Alabama	8	–	8	.500	25	–	11	.694
Mississippi State	7	–	9	.438	18	–	13	.581
Auburn	7	–	9	.438	18	–	14	.563
LSU	2	–	14	.125	13	–	16	.448
† 2001 SEC tournament winner Rankings from AP Poll

The 2000–01 Florida Gators men's basketball team represented the University of Florida in the sport of basketball during the 2000–01 college basketball season. The Gators competed in Division I of the National Collegiate Athletic Association (NCAA) and the Eastern Division of the Southeastern Conference (SEC). They were led by head coach Billy Donovan, and played their home games in the O'Connell Center on the university's Gainesville, Florida campus.

The Gators were the SEC regular season champions, winning a share of the title with a 12–4 conference record. Despite having four players undergo surgery during the year, and starting off 1–3 in conference play, they rebounded to capture the school's first ever back-to-back SEC championships. They earned a three seed in the 2001 NCAA tournament and advanced to the Second Round before losing to Temple. The Gators won an opening round game in the NCAA Tournament for a school record third consecutive year.

== Roster ==
Name	Number	Position	Height	Weight	Class	Hometown
Matt Bonner	15	F	6–10	237	Sophomore	Concord, NH
Bonell Colas	42	F	6–9	225	Freshman	Miami, Florida
Adriel Davis	33	F	6–5	221	Sophomore	Tallahassee, Florida
Teddy Dupay	5	G	5–11	178	Junior	Fort Myers, Florida
Orien Greene	1	G	6–4	208	Freshman	Gainesville, Florida
LaDarius Halton	23	F	6–4	200	Sophomore	New Smyrna Beach, Florida
Justin Hamilton	12	G	6–3	207	Sophomore	Sarasota, Florida
Udonis Haslem	50	C	6–9	246	Junior	Miami, Florida
David Kliewer	20	G	6–2	175	Sophomore	Tarpon Springs, Florida
Brett Nelson	10	G	6–4	182	Sophomore	St. Albans, West Virginia
Major Parker	25	F	6–4	218	Senior	Fort Lauderdale, Florida
Brent Wright	0	F	6–9	235	Senior	Miami, Florida

=== Coaches ===
Name	Position	College	Graduating year
Billy Donovan	Head coach	Providence College	1987
John Pelphrey	Assistant coach	University of Kentucky	1992
Anthony Grant	Assistant coach	Dayton	1987
Donnie Jones	Assistant coach	Pikeville	1988

== Schedule and results ==
Date time, TV	Rank^{#}	Opponent^{#}	Result	Record	Site city, state
Regular Season
Nov 17, 2000*	No. 11	at Florida State	W 85–70	1–0	Donald L. Tucker Center; Tallahassee, Florida
Nov 27, 2000*	No. 10	Florida Atlantic	W 100–42	2–0	Stephen C. O'Connell Center; Gainesville, Florida
Dec 2, 2000*	No. 10	DePaul	W 83–76	3–0	Stephen C. O'Connell Center; Gainesville, Florida
Dec 6, 2000*	No. 8	at No. 2 Michigan State	L 83–99	3–1	Breslin Student Events Center; East Lansing, Michigan
Dec 9, 2000*	No. 8	Rutgers	W 79–65	4–1	Stephen C. O'Connell Center; Gainesville, Florida
Dec 10, 2000*	No. 8	Florida A&M	W 125–50	5–1	Stephen C. O'Connell Center; Gainesville, Florida
Dec 16, 2000*	No. 8	Gonzaga; Orange Bowl Basketball Classic	W 85–71	6–1	National Car Rental Center; Sunrise, Florida
Dec 19, 2000*	No. 7	Bethune-Cookman	W 106–64	7–1	Stephen C. O'Connell Center; Gainesville, Florida
Dec 23, 2000*	No. 7	American	W 76–33	8–1	Stephen C. O'Connell Center; Gainesville, Florida
Dec 28, 2000*	No. 7	at Tulane	W 103–85	9–1	Avron B. Fogelman Arena; New Orleans, Louisiana
Dec 30, 2000*	No. 5	New Hampshire	W 102–54	10–1	Stephen C. O'Connell Center; Gainesville, Florida
Jan 7, 2001	No. 5	at South Carolina	L 68–69	10–2 (0–1)	Carolina Coliseum; Columbia, South Carolina
Jan 10, 2001	No. 8	at Mississippi State	W 81–80	11–2 (1–1)	Humphrey Coliseum; Starkville, Mississippi
Jan 17, 2001	No. 7	Georgia	L 72–75	11–3 (1–2)	Stephen C. O'Connell Center; Gainesville, Florida
Jan 20, 2001	No. 7	Vanderbilt	L 61–63	11–4 (1–3)	Stephen C. O'Connell Center; Gainesville, Florida
Jan 24, 2001	No. 14	at Auburn	W 65–63	12–4	Beard-Eaves-Memorial Coliseum; Auburn, Alabama
Feb 28, 2001	No. 6	at Vanderbilt	W 72–62	21–5 (11–4)	Memorial Gymnasium; Nashville, Tennessee
Mar 4, 2001	No. 6	No. 15 Kentucky	W 94–86	22–5 (12–4)	Stephen C. O'Connell Center; Gainesville, Florida
SEC Tournament
Mar 9, 2001*	No. 5	vs. Alabama; Quarterfinals	W 69–61	23–5	Bridgestone Arena; Nashville, Tennessee
Mar 10, 2001*	No. 5	vs. No. 14 Ole Miss; Semifinals	L 69–74	23–6	Bridgestone Arena; Nashville, Tennessee
NCAA Tournament
Mar 16, 2001*; 2:52 pm, CBS	(3 S) No. 8	vs. (14 S) Western Kentucky; First Round	W 69–56	24–6	Louisiana Superdome; New Orleans, Louisiana
Mar 18, 2001*; 2:30 pm, CBS	(3 S) No. 8	vs. (11 S) Temple; Second Round	L 54–75	24–7	Louisiana Superdome; New Orleans, Louisiana
*Non-conference game. ^{#}Rankings from AP Poll. (#) Tournament seedings in parentheses. S=South.
