= 2001 SEC men's basketball tournament =

- Classification: Division I
- Season: 2000–01
- Teams: 12
- Site: Gaylord Entertainment Center; Nashville, Tennessee
- Champions: Kentucky (24th title)
- Winning coach: Tubby Smith (3rd title)
- MVP: Tayshaun Prince (Kentucky)
- Attendance: 203,489
- Television: Jefferson Pilot Sports (1st Round, Quarterfinals, Semifinals); CBS (Championship game)

2000–01 Southeastern Conference men's basketball standings
	Conf.				Overall
Team	W		L	PCT	W		L	PCT
East
No. 8 Florida	12	–	4	.750	24	–	7	.774
No. 9 Kentucky †	12	–	4	.750	24	–	10	.706
Georgia	9	–	7	.563	16	–	15	.516
Tennessee	8	–	8	.500	22	–	11	.667
South Carolina	6	–	10	.375	15	–	15	.500
Vanderbilt	4	–	12	.250	15	–	15	.500
West
No. 14 Ole Miss	11	–	5	.688	27	–	8	.771
Arkansas	10	–	6	.625	20	–	11	.645
Alabama	8	–	8	.500	25	–	11	.694
Mississippi State	7	–	9	.438	18	–	13	.581
Auburn	7	–	9	.438	18	–	14	.563
LSU	2	–	14	.125	13	–	16	.448
† 2001 SEC tournament winner Rankings from AP Poll

The 2001 SEC Men’s Basketball Tournament took place on March 8–11, 2001 in Nashville, Tennessee at the Gaylord Entertainment Center.

The Kentucky Wildcats won the tournament and received the SEC’s automatic bid to the NCAA tournament by defeating the Ole Miss Rebels by a score of 77–55.

== Television coverage ==
The first, quarterfinal, and semifinal rounds were televised by Jefferson Pilot Sports, in its 15th season as the SEC's regional syndicated rightsholder. The SEC Championship Game was televised by CBS.

== Tournament notes ==
- This tournament marks the first time the SEC Tournament was played at Gaylord Entertainment Center (now Bridgestone Arena), and the third time that Nashville was the host city of the event with Vanderbilt University's Memorial Gymnasium having hosted the tournament in 1984 and 1991.

== Bracket ==
First round
W5	Auburn	66
E4	Tennessee	73
E6	Vanderbilt	59
W3	Alabama	78
E5	South Carolina	69
W4	Mississippi State	62
W6	LSU	63
E3	Georgia	62

Second Round
W1	#14 Ole Miss	86
E4	Tennessee	73
E2	#5 Florida	69
W3	Alabama	61
E1	#15 Kentucky	78
E5	South Carolina	61
W2	Arkansas	77
W6	LSU	72

Semifinals
W1	#14 Ole Miss	74
E2	#5 Florida	69
E1	#15 Kentucky	87
W2	Arkansas	78

Championship game
W1	#14 Ole Miss	55
E1	#15 Kentucky	77
