= 2000–01 Auburn Tigers men's basketball team =

American college basketball season

2000–01 Auburn Tigers men's basketball

NIT, Second Round
- Conference: Southeastern Conference
- West
- Record: 18–14 (7–9 SEC)
- Head coach: Cliff Ellis (7th season)
- Captains: Scott Pohlman; Reggie Sharp
- Home arena: Beard–Eaves–Memorial Coliseum

2000–01 Southeastern Conference men's basketball standings
	Conf.				Overall
Team	W		L	PCT	W		L	PCT
East
No. 8 Florida	12	–	4	.750	24	–	7	.774
No. 9 Kentucky †	12	–	4	.750	24	–	10	.706
Georgia	9	–	7	.563	16	–	15	.516
Tennessee	8	–	8	.500	22	–	11	.667
South Carolina	6	–	10	.375	15	–	15	.500
Vanderbilt	4	–	12	.250	15	–	15	.500
West
No. 14 Ole Miss	11	–	5	.688	27	–	8	.771
Arkansas	10	–	6	.625	20	–	11	.645
Alabama	8	–	8	.500	25	–	11	.694
Mississippi State	7	–	9	.438	18	–	13	.581
Auburn	7	–	9	.438	18	–	14	.563
LSU	2	–	14	.125	13	–	16	.448
† 2001 SEC tournament winner Rankings from AP Poll

The 2000–01 Auburn Tigers men's basketball team represented Auburn University in the 2000–01 college basketball season. The team's head coach was Cliff Ellis, who was in his seventh season at Auburn. The team played their home games at Beard–Eaves–Memorial Coliseum in Auburn, Alabama. They finished the season 18–14, 7–9 in SEC play. They lost to Tennessee in the first round of the SEC tournament. They received an invitation to the National Invitation Tournament, where they defeated Miami to advance to the second round where they lost to Purdue.

== Roster ==
2000–01 Auburn Tigers men's basketball team
Players
Coaches

Pos.	#	Name	Height	Weight	Year	Previous school	Hometown
G	3	Marquis Daniels	6 ft 6 in (1.98 m)	195 lb (88 kg)	So	Mount Zion Christian Academy	Orlando, Florida
G	10	Scott Pohlman	6 ft 2 in (1.88 m)	170 lb (77 kg)	Sr	Roswell	Roswell, Georgia
G	11	Reggie Sharp	6 ft 1 in (1.85 m)	185 lb (84 kg)	Sr	West Georgia	Shannon, Mississippi
F	31	Mack McGadney	6 ft 7 in (2.01 m)	245 lb (111 kg)	Jr	LeFlore	Mobile, Alabama

Head coach

- Cliff Ellis

Assistant coach(es)

Legend

- (C) Team captain
- (S) Suspended
- (I) Ineligible
- (W) Walk-on
- Injured
- Current redshirt

Roster
