= Jerry Green (basketball coach) =

American college basketball coach (born 1944)

Jerry Green (born c. 1944) was a college basketball coach from the 1980s through 2001. He was the head coach at UNC Asheville, the University of Oregon, and the University of Tennessee. He also was an assistant at the University of Kansas under Roy Williams.

In his four years at Kansas (1988–1992) under Williams, he helped the Jayhawks to a 103–30 (.774) record and the 1991 national title game. Previously, he spent twelve seasons at UNC Asheville, three as an assistant coach (1976–1979) and his last nine as head coach (1979–1988). Green helped guide Asheville through two major changes in the last three years of his tenure. The Bulldogs made the move up from the NAIA level to the ranks of NCAA Division II, and then became a Division I program for Green's final two seasons. His teams posted a combined 150–108 (.581) record.

Green was the head coach at Oregon from 1992–97, where in 1995 he led the Ducks to their first NCAA tournament appearance since 1961. In April 1997, he was hired by Tennessee, then resigned four years later in March 2001. Green led the Volunteers to four consecutive NCAA tournament appearances, and was succeeded by Buzz Peterson.

He was the Director of Basketball Operations at Indiana University, but has since retired.

== Head coaching record ==
Statistics overview
Season	Team	Overall	Conference	Standing	Postseason
North Carolina-Asheville Bulldogs (Was Transitioning to Division 1) (1979–1985)
1979–1980	North Carolina-Asheville	11–16			
1980–1981	North Carolina-Asheville	14–15			
1981–1982	North Carolina-Asheville	19–10			
1982–1983	North Carolina-Asheville	22–9			
1983–1984	North Carolina-Asheville	21–10			
1984–1985	North Carolina-Asheville	15–13			
North Carolina-Asheville:		89–73			
North Carolina-Asheville Bulldogs (Big South) (1985–1988)
1985–1986	North Carolina-Asheville	20–9	4–2	5th	
1986–1987	North Carolina-Asheville	15–11	5–3	3rd	
1987–1988	North Carolina-Asheville	13–15	5–7	T-5th	
North Carolina-Asheville:		48–35	14–12		
North Carolina-Asheville:		150–108	14–12		
University of Oregon (Pacific-10 Conference) (1992–1997)
1992–93	Oregon	10–20	3–15	9th	
1993–94	Oregon	10–17	6–12	8th	
1994–95	Oregon	19–9	11–7	4th	NCAA 1st Round
1995–96	Oregon	16–13	9–9	T-5th	
1996–97	Oregon	17–11	8–10	7th	NIT 1st Round
Oregon:		72–70	37–53		
University of Tennessee (SEC East) (1997–2001)
1997–98	Tennessee	20–9	9–7	3rd	NCAA 1st Round
1998–99	Tennessee	21–9	12–4	1st	NCAA 2nd Round
1999-00	Tennessee	26–7	12–4	T-1st	NCAA Sweet Sixteen
2000–01	Tennessee	22–11	8–8	4th	NCAA 1st Round
Tennessee:		89–36	41–23		
Total:		161–106			
National champion Postseason invitational champion Conference regular season champion Conference regular season and conference tournament champion Division regular season champion Division regular season and conference tournament champion Conference tournament champion
