= 2000–01 Kentucky Wildcats men's basketball team =

2000–01 season of University of Kentucky men's basketball team

2000–01 Kentucky Wildcats men's basketball
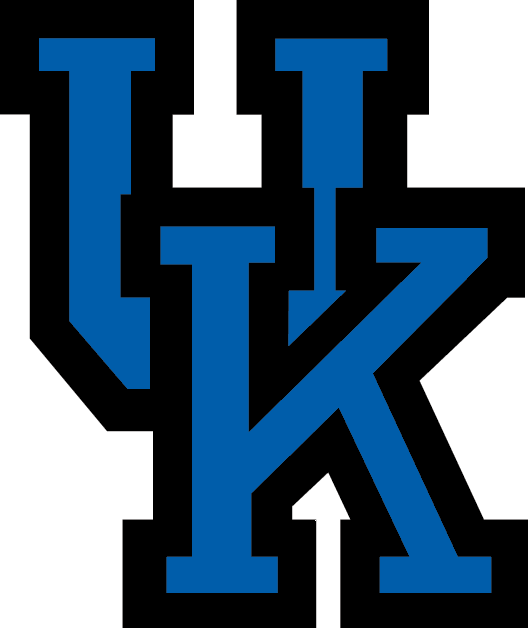

SEC tournament champions SEC regular season co-champions

NCAA tournament, Sweet Sixteen
- Conference: Southeastern Conference

Ranking
- Coaches: No. 8
- AP: No. 9
- Record: 24–10 (12–4 SEC)
- Head coach: Tubby Smith (4th season)
- Home arena: Rupp Arena

2000–01 Southeastern Conference men's basketball standings
	Conf.				Overall
Team	W		L	PCT	W		L	PCT
East
No. 8 Florida	12	–	4	.750	24	–	7	.774
No. 9 Kentucky †	12	–	4	.750	24	–	10	.706
Georgia	9	–	7	.563	16	–	15	.516
Tennessee	8	–	8	.500	22	–	11	.667
South Carolina	6	–	10	.375	15	–	15	.500
Vanderbilt	4	–	12	.250	15	–	15	.500
West
No. 14 Ole Miss	11	–	5	.688	27	–	8	.771
Arkansas	10	–	6	.625	20	–	11	.645
Alabama	8	–	8	.500	25	–	11	.694
Mississippi State	7	–	9	.438	18	–	13	.581
Auburn	7	–	9	.438	18	–	14	.563
LSU	2	–	14	.125	13	–	16	.448
† 2001 SEC tournament winner Rankings from AP Poll

The 2000–01 Kentucky Wildcats men's basketball team represented University of Kentucky in the 2000–01 NCAA Division I men's basketball season. The head coach was Tubby Smith and the team finished the season with an overall record of 24–10. In the 2001 NCAA Tournament Kentucky advanced to the Sweet 16, before being eliminated by USC 79–69.
