= 2000–01 Arkansas Razorbacks men's basketball team =

American college basketball season

2000–01 Arkansas Razorbacks men's basketball

NCAA tournament, Round of 64
- Conference: Southeastern Conference
- West
- Record: 20–11 (10–6 SEC)
- Head coach: Nolan Richardson (16th season)
- Home arena: Bud Walton Arena

2000–01 Southeastern Conference men's basketball standings
| | Conf. | | | | Overall |
| Team | W | | L | PCT | W | | L | PCT |
|---|---|---|---|---|---|---|---|---|
East
| No. 8 Florida | 12 | – | 4 | .750 | 24 | – | 7 | .774 |
| No. 9 Kentucky † | 12 | – | 4 | .750 | 24 | – | 10 | .706 |
| Georgia | 9 | – | 7 | .563 | 16 | – | 15 | .516 |
| Tennessee | 8 | – | 8 | .500 | 22 | – | 11 | .667 |
| South Carolina | 6 | – | 10 | .375 | 15 | – | 15 | .500 |
| Vanderbilt | 4 | – | 12 | .250 | 15 | – | 15 | .500 |
West
| No. 14 Ole Miss | 11 | – | 5 | .688 | 27 | – | 8 | .771 |
| Arkansas | 10 | – | 6 | .625 | 20 | – | 11 | .645 |
| Alabama | 8 | – | 8 | .500 | 25 | – | 11 | .694 |
| Mississippi State | 7 | – | 9 | .438 | 18 | – | 13 | .581 |
| Auburn | 7 | – | 9 | .438 | 18 | – | 14 | .563 |
| LSU | 2 | – | 14 | .125 | 13 | – | 16 | .448 |
† 2001 SEC tournament winner Rankings from AP Poll

The 2000–01 Arkansas Razorbacks men's basketball team represented the University of Arkansas in the 2000–01 college basketball season. The head coach was Nolan Richardson, serving for his 16th year. The team played its home games in Bud Walton Arena in Fayetteville, Arkansas.

== Schedule ==
| Date time, TV | Rank^{#} | Opponent^{#} | Result | Record | Site (attendance) city, state |
John Thompson Foundation Challenge Classic
| 11/17/00*; 8:15 pm | No. 15 | Tennessee State | W 90–68 | 1–0 | Bud Walton Arena (16,781); Fayetteville, Arkansas |
| 11/18/00*; 8:30 pm | No. 15 | Southern Miss | L 54–63 | 1–1 | Bud Walton Arena (16,372); Fayetteville, Arkansas |
Regular Season
| 11/22/00*; 7:00 pm | No. 24 | Jackson State | W 107–78 | 2–1 | Bud Walton Arena (13,417); Fayetteville, Arkansas |
| 11/25/00*; 2:00 pm | No. 24 | Louisiana-Monroe | W 99–59 | 3–1 | Bud Walton Arena (13,755); Fayetteville, Arkansas |
| 11/28/00*; 7:00 pm | No. 25 | Centenary | W 88–57 | 4–1 | Bud Walton Arena (14,017); Fayetteville, Arkansas |
| 12/2/00*; 2:00 pm, WLMT | No. 25 | Memphis | W 74–68 | 5–1 | Bud Walton Arena (18,725); Fayetteville, Arkansas |
| 12/5/00*; 7:00 pm | No. 21 | North Texas | W 97–77 | 6–1 | Bud Walton Arena (14,183); Fayetteville, Arkansas |
| 12/9/00*; 7:00 pm | No. 21 | vs. Oklahoma State | L 73–74 | 6–2 | Mabee Center (9,574); Tulsa, Oklahoma |
| 12/20/00*; 7:00 pm | No. 25 | Northwestern State | W 115–47 | 7–2 | Bud Walton Arena (15,220); Fayetteville, Arkansas |
| 12/23/00*; 7:00 pm | No. 23 | at No. 17 Oklahoma | L 79–88 ^{OT} | 7–3 | Lloyd Noble Center (11,479); Norman, Oklahoma |
| 12/31/00*; 1:00 pm | | Grambling State | W 121–66 | 8–3 | Bud Walton Arena (8,242); Fayetteville, Arkansas |
| 1/2/01*; 7:00 pm | | Maryland Eastern Shore | W 100–40 | 9–3 | Bud Walton Arena (7,362); Fayetteville, Arkansas |
| 1/6/01; 2:00 pm | | at Mississippi State | L 73–87 | 9–4 | Humphrey Coliseum (6,142); Starkville, Mississippi |
| 1/10/01; 7:00 pm | | No. 20 Mississippi | L 48–53 | 9–5 | Bud Walton Arena (18,419); Fayetteville, Arkansas |
| 1/13/01; 3:00 pm, CBS | | at Vanderbilt | L 64–81 | 9–6 | Memorial Gymnasium (12,221); Nashville, Tennessee |
| 1/17/01; 7:00 pm | | Auburn | W 82–72 | 10–6 | Bud Walton Arena (17,917); Fayetteville, Arkansas |
| 1/20/01; 4:00 pm, FSN | | No. 12 Alabama | W 87–58 | 11–6 | Bud Walton Arena (19,235); Fayetteville, Arkansas |
| 1/27/01; 4:00 pm, FSN | | at LSU | W 59–52 | 12–6 | Maravich Assembly Center (10,728); Baton Rouge, Louisiana |
| 1/31/01; 7:00 pm, JP Sports | | at Mississippi | L 73–84 | 12–7 | Tad Smith Coliseum (8,085); Oxford, Mississippi |
| 2/3/01; 12:00 pm, JP Sports | | Mississippi State | W 83–72 | 13–7 | Bud Walton Arena (19,112); Fayetteville, Arkansas |
| 2/7/01; 7:00 pm, JP Sports | | No. 8 Tennessee | W 82–77 ^{OT} | 14–7 | Bud Walton Arena (19,684); Fayetteville, Arkansas |
| 2/10/01; 12:00 pm, JP Sports | | at No. 8 Florida | L 63–73 | 14–8 | O'Connell Center (12,009); Gainesville, Florida |
| 2/14/01; 7:00 pm, JP Sports | | at Auburn | L 63–71 | 14–9 | Beard-Eaves-Memorial Coliseum (10,500); Auburn, AL |
| 2/17/01; 12:00 pm, JP Sports | | LSU | W 87–70 | 15–9 | Bud Walton Arena (19,076); Fayetteville, Arkansas |
| 2/20/01; 8:00 pm, ESPN | | at South Carolina | W 69–67 | 16–9 | Frank McGuire Arena (5,962); Columbia, South Carolina |
| 2/25/01; 12:00 pm, CBS | | Kentucky | W 82–78 | 17–9 | Bud Walton Arena (20,266); Fayetteville, Arkansas |
| 2/28/01; 7:00 pm, JP Sports | | at No. 19 Alabama | W 66–63 | 18–9 | Coleman Coliseum (10,659); Tuscaloosa, AL |
| 3/3/01; 1:00 pm | | Georgia | W 82–67 | 19–9 | Bud Walton Arena (20,274); Fayetteville, Arkansas |
2001 SEC men's basketball tournament
| 3/9/01; 8:45 pm | | vs. LSU | W 77–72 | 20–9 | Gaylord Entertainment Center (18,895); Nashville, Tennessee |
| 3/10/01; 2:15 pm, JP Sports | | vs. No. 15 Kentucky | L 78–87 | 20–10 | Gaylord Entertainment Center (20,225); Nashville, Tennessee |
NCAA Tournament – West Region
| 3/15/01*; 6:50 pm, CBS | (7) | vs. (10) Georgetown | L 61–63 | 20–11 | BSU Pavilion (11,085); Boise, Idaho |
*Non-conference game. ^{#}Rankings from AP Poll. (#) Tournament seedings in parentheses.
