= Ryan Mendez (basketball) =

American basketball player

Ryan Mendez (born c. 1977) was a highly successful basketball player at Stanford University.

== College basketball ==
Mendez played basketball at Stanford University from 1996-2001. He set a Pac-10 record for most consecutive free throws (49) during the 2000-01 season. Luke Ridnour of Oregon broke that record in 2003 with 62.

He also is Stanford's 7th highest career three-point percentage at .420 (178/424) and has a career FT percentage of .869 (186/214) which is 4th highest in Pac-10 and 2nd highest in Stanford history. Mendez led the Pac-10 in free-throw percentage during the 1999-2000 (63/72, .875) and 2000-01 (94/101, .931) seasons. He led Stanford in 3-point shooting percentage in 1996-97 (29/68, .427) and the Pac-10 in 1997-98 (45/95, .474).
