= 2000–01 Big East Conference men's basketball season =

American college basketball season

2000–01 Big East Conference Men's Basketball Season
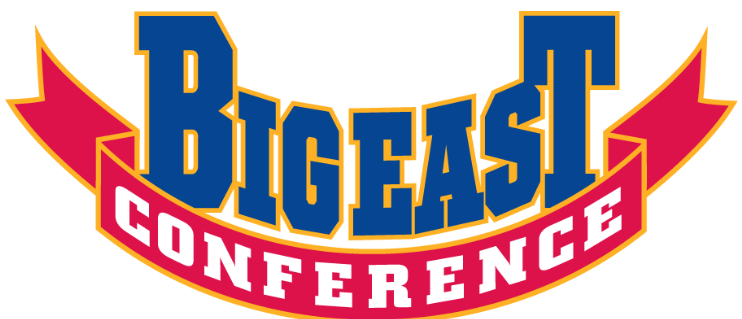
- League: NCAA Division I
- Sport: Basketball
- Duration: November 9, 2000 through March 10, 2001
- Teams: 14
- TV partner: ESPN

Regular Season
- Champion: Boston College (East, 13–3); Notre Dame (West, 11–5)
- Season MVP: Troy Bell – Boston College and Troy Murphy – Notre Dame

Tournament
- Champions: Boston College
- Finals MVP: Troy Bell – Boston College

Basketball seasons
- 1999–2000 2001–02

2000–01 Big East men's basketball standings
	Conf.				Overall
Team	W		L	PCT	W		L	PCT
East
No. 7 Boston College †	13	–	3	.813	27	–	5	.844
Providence	11	–	5	.688	21	–	10	.677
St. John's#	8	–	8	.500	5	–	15	.250
Miami	8	–	8	.500	16	–	13	.552
Villanova	8	–	8	.500	18	–	13	.581
Connecticut	8	–	8	.500	20	–	12	.625
Virginia Tech*	2	–	14	.125	8	–	19	.296
West
No. 19 Notre Dame	11	–	5	.688	20	–	10	.667
No. 21 Georgetown	10	–	6	.625	25	–	8	.758
No. 17 Syracuse	10	–	6	.625	25	–	9	.735
West Virginia	8	–	8	.500	17	–	12	.586
Pittsburgh	7	–	9	.438	19	–	14	.576
Seton Hall	5	–	11	.313	16	–	15	.516
Rutgers*	3	–	13	.188	11	–	16	.407
† 2001 Big East tournament winner As of April 2, 2001; Rankings from AP Poll #St. John's had 9 regular-season games vacated due to sanctions against the program; the school′s disputed record was 8–8, 14–15. *Did not qualify for 2001 Big East tournament.

The 2000–01 Big East Conference men's basketball season was the 22nd in conference history, and involved its 14 full-time member schools.

Boston College was the regular-season champion of the East Division with a record of 13–3, and Notre Dame won the West Division with a record of 11–5. Boston College won the Big East tournament championship.

== Season summary & highlights ==
- The Big East expanded for the first time since the 1995–96 season, adding Virginia Tech as its 14th member.
- For the second time in its history, the Big East adopted a divisional structure, with an East Division and a West Division, each composed of seven teams. (Note: For three seasons, from the 1995–96 season through the 1997–98 season, the Big East played with two divisions, the Big East 6 and Big East 7 divisions.) The divisional structure lasted through the 2002–03 season.
- The Big East reduced its regular-season schedule from 18 to 16 games.
- Boston College won the East Division regular-season championship with a record of 13–3. It was Boston College's fourth regular-season championship or co-championship. It also was Boston College's second division championship or co-championship and first outright division title. (Note: Boston College won the Big East 6 Division co-championship in the 1996–97 season.)
- Notre Dame won the West Division regular-season championship with a record of 11–5. It was Notre Dame's first conference championship or co-championship and first division title.
- Boston College won its second Big East tournament championship.
- St. John's later had nine of its regular-season wins this season vacated due to sanctions imposed on the program for the use of an ineligible player.

== Head coaches ==
School	Coach	Season	Notes
Boston College	Al Skinner	4th	Big East Coach of the Year
Connecticut	Jim Calhoun	15th	
Georgetown	Craig Esherick	3rd	
Miami	Perry Clark	1st	
Notre Dame	Mike Brey	1st	
Pittsburgh	Ben Howland	2nd	
Providence	Tim Welsh	3rd	
Rutgers	Kevin Bannon	4th	Fired March 20, 2001
St. John's	Mike Jarvis	3rd	
Seton Hall	Tommy Amaker	4th	Resigned March 21, 2001
Syracuse	Jim Boeheim	25th	
Villanova	Steve Lappas	9th	Resigned March 24, 2001
Virginia Tech	Ricky Stokes	2nd	
West Virginia	Gale Catlett	23rd	

== Rankings ==
Boston College, Connecticut, Georgetown, Notre Dame, St. John's, Seton Hall, and Syracuse all spent time in the Associated Press poll Top 25 during the season. Boston College finished the season ranked No. 7.

2000–01 Big East Conference Weekly Rankings Key: ██ Increase in ranking. ██ Decrease in ranking.
AP Poll	Pre	11/13	11/20	11/27	12/4	12/11	12/18	12/25	1/1	1/8	1/15	1/22	1/29	2/5	2/12	2/19	2/26	3/5	Final
Boston College										24	25	23	20	17	9	10	11	10	7
Connecticut	14	13	12	16	15	11	11	10	10	13	15	24							
Georgetown						24	23	21	19	12	9	10	14	15	18	21	21	18	21
Miami																			
Notre Dame	15	16	14	11	10	21	21	22	21	25			23	20	14	18	13	19	19
Pittsburgh																			
Providence																			
Rutgers																			
St. John's		24	23	19	24														
Seton Hall	10	10	10	8	7	9	8	11	11	15	18	16	22						
Syracuse				20	13	12	12	15	14	11	8	11	12	9	10	17	19	17	17
Villanova																			
Virginia Tech																			
West Virginia																			

== Regular-season statistical leaders ==
Scoring
Name	School	PPG
Troy Murphy	ND	21.8
Michael Bradley	Vill	20.8
Troy Bell	BC	20.4
Preston Shumpert	Syr	19.5
Eddie Griffin	SHU	17.8

Rebounding
Name	School	RPG
Eddie Griffin	SHU	10.8
Michael Bradley	Vill	9.8
Calvin Bowman	WVU	9.7
Rashod Kent	RU	9.3
Troy Murphy	ND	9.2

Assists
Name	School	APG
Omar Cook	SJU	8.7
Allen Griffin	Syr	6.5
Martin Ingelsby	ND	6.4
Kevin Braswell	GU	6.1
Brandin Knight	Pitt	5.5

Steals
Name	School	SPG
John Linehan	Prov	3.1
Kevin Braswell	GU	2.8
Troy Bell	BC	2.6
Omar Cook	SJU	2.3
Brandin Knight	Pitt	2.2

Blocks
Name	School	BPG
Eddie Griffin	SHU	4.4
Ryan Humphrey	ND	2.7
Ruben Boumtje-Boumtje	GU	2.4
Karim Shabazz	Prov	2.4
Samuel Dalembert	SHU	2.1

Field Goals
Name	School	FG%
Michael Bradley	Vill	.692
Calvin Bowman	WVU	.541
Ryan Humphrey	ND	.505
Anthony Glover	SJU	.494
Damone Brown	Syr	.492

3-Pt Field Goals
Name	School	3FG%
Brian Chase	VT	.458
Todd Billet	RU	.406
Darius Lane	SHU	.395
(no other qualifiers)

Free Throws
Name	School	FT%
Gary Buchanan	Vill	.942
Albert Mouring	Conn	.889
Troy Bell	BC	.857
John Linehan	Prov	.896
John Salmons	Mia	.793

== Postseason ==
=== Big East tournament ===
==== Seeding ====
Two teams — the seventh-place finishers in each division based on conference record, after the application of tiebreakers as necessary — did not qualify for the Big East Tournament, the first time in history that some teams were excluded from the tournament. The remaining six teams in each division were seeded No. 1 through No. 6 by division based on conference record, again applying tiebreakers as necessary. Four teams — the No. 1 and No. 2 seeds in each division — received a bye into the quarterfinal round. Eight teams — the No. 3 through No. 6 seeds in each division — played in the first round. In the first round the No. 3 East seed played the No. 6 West seed, the No. 4 East seed played the No. 5 West seed, the No. 5 East seed played the No. 4 West seed, and the No. 6 East seed played the No. 3 West seed.

Seeding in the East Division was (1) Boston College, (2) Providence, (3) St. John's, (4) Miami, (5) Villanova, and (6) Connecticut. Seeding in the West Division was (1) Notre Dame, (2) Georgetown, (3) Syracuse, (4) West Virginia, (5) Pittsburgh, and (6) Seton Hall. The two seventh-place finishers that did not qualify for the tournament were Virginia Tech in the East Division and Rutgers in the West Division.

==== Bracket ====
First round March 7, 2001
W5	Pittsburgh	78
E4	Miami	69
E6	Connecticut	75
W3	#17 Syracuse	86
E5	Villanova	82
W4	West Virginia	71
W6	Seton Hall	78
E3	St. John's	66

Quarterfinals; March 8, 2001
W1	#19 Notre Dame	54
W5	Pittsburgh	66
E2	Providence	54
W3	#17 Syracuse	55
E1	#10 Boston College	93
E5	Villanova	79
W2	#18 Georgetown	40
W6	Seton Hall	58

Semifinals; March 9, 2001
W5	Pittsburgh*	55
W3	#17 Syracuse	54
E1	#10 Boston College	75
W6	Seton Hall	48

Championship Game; March 10, 2001
W5	Pittsburgh	57
E1	#10 Boston College	79

=== NCAA tournament ===
Five Big East teams received bids to the NCAA Tournament. Providence lost in the first round and Boston College, Notre Dame, and Syracuse in the second round. Georgetown was defeated in the West Region semifinals.

School	Region	Seed	Round 1	Round 2	Sweet 16
Georgetown	West	10	7 Arkansas, W 63–61	15 Hampton, W 76–57	3 Maryland, L 76–66
Boston College	East	3	14 Southern Utah, W 68–65	6 USC, L 74–71	
Syracuse	Midwest	5	12 Hawaii, W 79–69	4 Kansas, L 87–58	
Notre Dame	Midwest	6	11 Xavier, W 83–71	3 Ole Miss, L 59–56	
Providence	South	10	7 Penn State, L 69–59		

=== National Invitation Tournament ===
Six Big East teams received bids to the National Invitation Tournament, which did not yet have seeding. They played in three of the tournament's four unnamed brackets. Miami, Seton Hall, Villanova, and West Virginia all lost in the first round. Connecticut and Pittsburgh lost in the second round.

School	Round 1	Round 2
Connecticut	South Carolina, W 72–65	Detroit, L 67–61
Pittsburgh	St. Bonaventure, W 84–75	Mississippi State, W 66–61
Miami	Auburn, L 60–58	
Seton Hall	Alabama, L 85–79	
Villanova	Minnesota, L 87–78	
West Virginia	Richmond, L 79–56	

== Awards and honors ==
=== Big East Conference ===
Co-Players of the Year:

- Troy Bell, Boston College, G, So.
- Troy Murphy, Notre Dame, F, Jr.

Defensive Player of the Year:

- John Linehan, Providence, G, Jr.

Rookie of the Year:

- Eddie Griffin, Seton Hall, F, Fr.

Co-Most Improved Players:

- Calvin Bowman, West Virginia, C, Sr.
- Preston Shumpert, Syracuse, F, Jr.

Coach of the Year:

- Al Skinner, Boston College (4th season)

All-Big East First Team

- Troy Bell, Boston College, G, So., 6 ft 1 in (185 cm), 180 lb (82 kg), Minneapolis, Minn.
- Troy Murphy, Notre Dame, F, Jr., 6 ft 11 in (211 cm), 245 lb (111 kg), Morristown, N.J.
- Preston Shumpert, Syracuse, F, Jr., 6 ft 6 in (198 cm), 200 lb (91 kg), Muncie, Ind.
- Michael Bradley, Villanova, C, Jr., 6 ft 10 in (208 cm), 235 lb (107 kg), Worcester, Mass.
- Calvin Bowman, West Virginia, C, Sr., 6 ft 9 in (206 cm), 220 lb (100 kg), Brooklyn, N.Y.

All-Big East Second Team:

- Kevin Braswell, Georgetown, G, Jr., 6 ft 2 in (188 cm), 190 lb (86 kg), Baltimore, Md.
- Ricardo Greer, Pittsburgh, F, Sr., 6 ft 5 in (196 cm), 200 lb (91 kg), New York, N.Y.
- John Linehan, Providence, G, Jr., 5 ft 9 in (175 cm), 165 lb (75 kg), Chester, Pa.
- Eddie Griffin, Seton Hall, F, Fr., 6 ft 10 in (208 cm), 240 lb (109 kg), Philadelphia, Pa.
- Damone Brown, Syracuse, F, Sr., 6 ft 9 in (206 cm), 212 lb (96 kg), Buffalo, N.Y.

All-Big East Third Team:

- Caron Butler, Connecticut, F, Fr., 6 ft 7 in (201 cm), 217 lb (98 kg), Racine, Wis.
- John Salmons, Miami, G, Jr., 6 ft 7 in (201 cm), 210 lb (95 kg), Plymouth Meeting, Pa.
- Ryan Humphrey, Notre Dame, F, Jr., 6 ft 8 in (203 cm), 235 lb (107 kg), Tulsa, Okla.
- Todd Billet, Rutgers, G, So., 6 ft 0 in (183 cm), 192 lb (87 kg), Middletown, N.J.
- Omar Cook, St. John's, G, Fr., 6 ft 1 in (185 cm), 190 lb (86 kg), Queens, N.Y.

Big East All-Rookie Team:

- Caron Butler, Connecticut, F, Fr., 6 ft 7 in (201 cm), 217 lb (98 kg), Racine, Wis.
- Michael Sweetney, Georgetown, F, Fr., 6 ft 8 in (203 cm), 275 lb (125 kg), Oxon Hill, Md.
- Darius Rice, Miami, F, Fr., 6 ft 10 in (208 cm), 222 lb (101 kg), Jackson, Miss.
- Eddie Griffin, Seton Hall, F, Fr., 6 ft 10 in (208 cm), 240 lb (109 kg), Philadelphia, Pa.
- Omar Cook, St. John's, G, Fr., 6 ft 1 in (185 cm), 190 lb (86 kg), Queens, N.Y.

=== All-Americans ===
The following players were selected to the 2001 Associated Press All-America teams.

Consensus All-America First Team:

- Troy Murphy, Notre Dame, Key Stats: 21.8 ppg, 9.2 rpg, 2.1 apg, 1.7 bpg, 47.1 FG%, 34.9 3P%, 653 points

Consensus All-America Second Team:

- Troy Bell, Boston College, Key Stats: 20.4 ppg, 4.3 rpg, 4.2 apg, 2.6 bpg, 45.9 FG%, 39.1 3P%, 652 points
- Michael Bradley, Villanova, Key Stats: 20.8 ppg, 9.8 rpg, 2.6 apg, 1.8 bpg, 69.2 FG%, 35.3 3P%, 645 points

First Team All-America:

- Troy Murphy, Notre Dame, Key Stats: 21.8 ppg, 9.2 rpg, 2.1 apg, 1.7 bpg, 47.1 FG%, 34.9 3P%, 653 points

Second Team All-America:

- Troy Bell, Boston College, Key Stats: 20.4 ppg, 4.3 rpg, 4.2 apg, 2.6 bpg, 45.9 FG%, 39.1 3P%, 652 points
- Michael Bradley, Villanova, Key Stats: 20.8 ppg, 9.8 rpg, 2.6 apg, 1.8 bpg, 69.2 FG%, 35.3 3P%, 645 points

AP Honorable Mention

- Eddie Griffin, Seton Hall
- Preston Shumpert, Syracuse

== See also ==
- 2000–01 NCAA Division I men's basketball season
- 2000–01 Boston College Eagles men's basketball team
- 2000–01 Connecticut Huskies men's basketball team
- 2000–01 Georgetown Hoyas men's basketball team
- 2000–01 Notre Dame Fighting Irish men's basketball team
- 2000–01 Pittsburgh Panthers men's basketball team
- 2000–01 Providence Friars men's basketball team
- 2000–01 St. John's Red Storm men's basketball team
- 2000–01 Syracuse Orangemen basketball team
