= Tommy Amaker =

American basketball player and coach (born 1965)

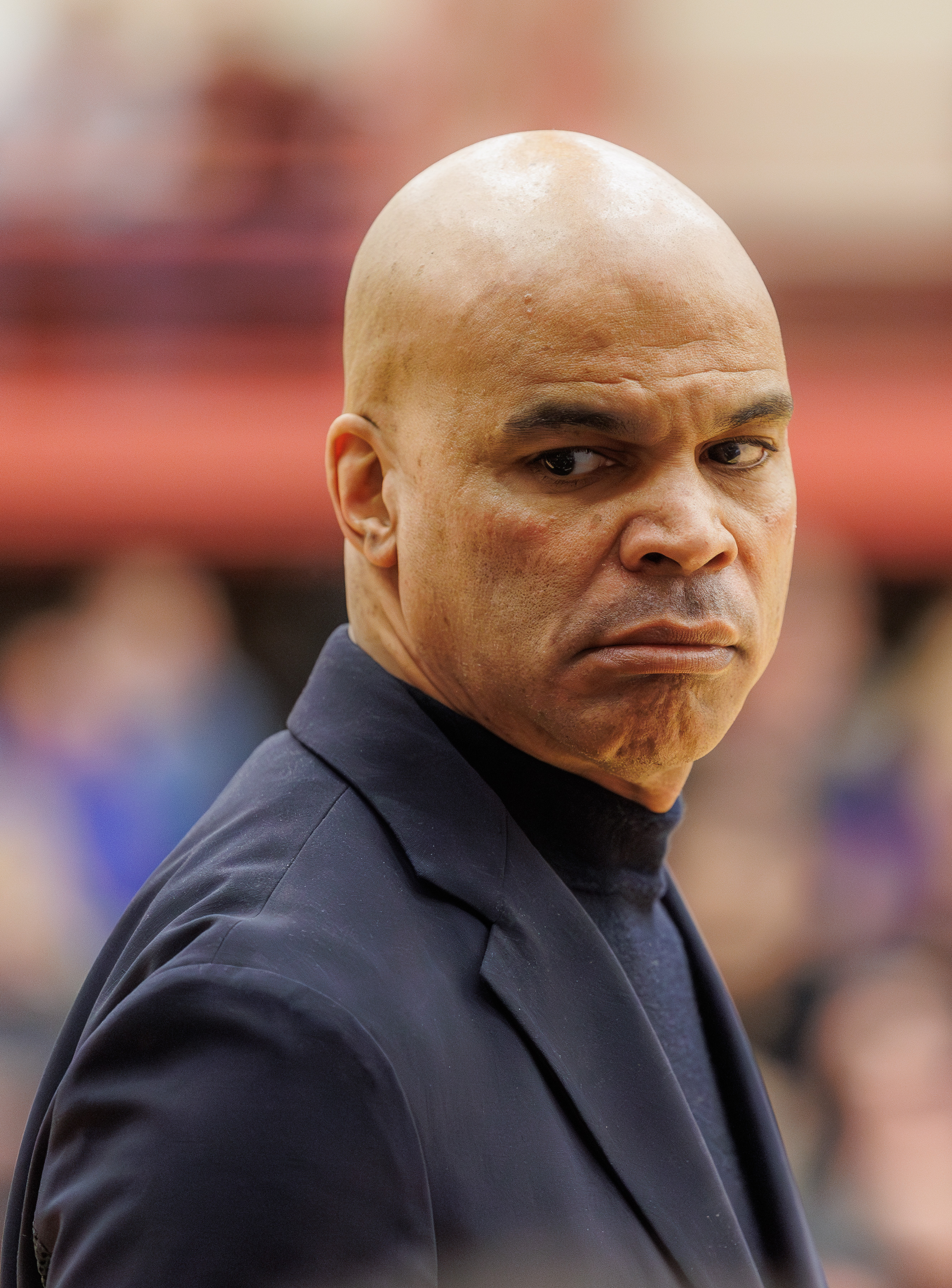
- Amaker in 2024

Current position
- Title: Head coach
- Team: Harvard
- Conference: Ivy League
- Record: 324–210 (.607)

Biographical details
- Born: June 6, 1965 (age 61); Falls Church, Virginia, U.S.

Playing career
- 1983–1987: Duke
- Position: Point guard

Coaching career (HC unless noted)
- 1988–1997: Duke (assistant)
- 1997–2001: Seton Hall
- 2001–2007: Michigan
- 2007–present: Harvard

Head coaching record
- Overall: 500–349 (.589)
- Tournaments: 4–5 (NCAA Division I); 11–8 (NIT); 0–1 (CIT)

Accomplishments and honors

Championships
- NIT (2004); 7 Ivy League regular-season (2011–2015, 2018, 2019)

Awards
- Player: NABC Defensive Player of the Year (1987); Third-team All-American – NABC (1987); Second-team All-ACC (1987); High School All-American (1983: McD, Parade)
Medal record
Men's basketball
Representing United States
William Jones Cup
Silver medal – second place	1985 Taipei	USA
FIBA World Championship
Gold medal – first place	1986 Spain	USA

Harold Tommy Amaker Jr. (/ˈæməkər/; born June 6, 1965) is an American college basketball coach and the head coach of the Harvard University men's basketball team. He has also coached for the University of Michigan and Seton Hall University. He played point guard and later served as an assistant coach at Duke University under Mike Krzyzewski. An All-American player, Amaker set numerous records and earned many honors and awards. He took Seton Hall to the postseason in each of his four seasons as their coach, helped Michigan win the National Invitation Tournament the year after a probationary ban from postseason play, and had the three highest single-season win totals in the history of Harvard basketball, the school's first six Ivy League championships and first NCAA tournament victory.

Amaker was a high school basketball star at W. T. Woodson High School from 1979 to 1983 under coach Paul (Red) Jenkins. Amaker led the Woodson Cavaliers to four straight Northern District titles, including victories over the national powerhouse DeMatha Catholic High School. A McDonald's All-American, Amaker also earned the Wooden Defensive Player of the Year award in 1983, awarded to the nation's best high school defensive player. He averaged almost 18 points, and contributed 7.5 assists and 3.5 steals per game while at Woodson. In December 1992, the Connection named Amaker to the Connection Dream Team, as a point guard.McDonald's All-American and a Parade All-American. As a college basketball player, he set most of the assists records and many steals records for Duke basketball. He also set the Atlantic Coast Conference single-season games played and games started records. Among his numerous accolades, he was the first winner of the NABC Defensive Player of the Year, and he was a third team All-American.

Amaker was an assistant coach for the Duke Blue Devils men's basketball under Krzyzewski for nine seasons. His first four seasons were part of a five-year streak of Final Four appearances by Duke (including back-to-back national championships). As a head coach, Amaker took the Seton Hall Pirates to postseason tournaments (NCAA Division I men's basketball tournament [2000] and National Invitation Tournament [1998, 1999 and 2001]) in each of his four seasons as their coach. Assistant coach, Jason Lampa, credits the success that Amaker experienced at Seton Hall to his calm demeanor and respect for players. He dealt with the turmoil and self-imposed sanctions of the University of Michigan basketball scandal in his first years with Michigan, where he eventually won the 2004 National Invitation Tournament with the 2003–04 Michigan Wolverines men's basketball team and finished as the runner-up with Michigan in the 2006 National Invitation Tournament.

In his tenure as Harvard men's basketball coach, he was the first coach to lead the Crimson to victory over a ranked opponent with the school. He also coached the 2009–10 Harvard Crimson men's basketball team into the postseason (2010 CollegeInsider.com Tournament) in his third year there, which included the highest single-season victory total (21) in school history. In the summer of 2010, the NCAA ruled that Amaker had committed a recruiting violation, resulting in NCAA-mandated recruiting restrictions, the university's first NCAA penalty of the men's basketball program. The 2010–11 team became the first Harvard men's basketball team to clinch a share of the Ivy League championship and surpassed the prior season win total (23). The 2011–12 team became the first in school history to appear in the Associated Press (AP) and Coaches Polls and, for the third year in a row, established a new school record for wins (26). Amaker's 2011–12, 2012–13, 2013–14 and 2014–15 teams repeated as Ivy League champions. The 2012–13 team gave Harvard its first NCAA tournament victory. The 2013–14 team posted a record 27 wins. Amaker became the winningest coach in school history in 2016.

== Early years ==
Amaker was born in Falls Church, Virginia in 1965.

Amaker resided in Falls Church, but he attended W. T. Woodson High School in Fairfax, Virginia, because his mother, Alma Amaker, was a high school English teacher in Fairfax County. Her job allowed her to choose among the county schools, her choice made because the school's basketball coach, Red Jenkins, who called Amaker "T-bird", had been impressed with his performances at his youth summer league since Amaker was 10 years old. He began playing varsity for Woodson by December, making him the first freshman to play varsity in the school's history. His mother, whom Jenkins called "his first coach and his best coach," attended his practices and graded papers in the coach's office.

Duke University basketball head coach Mike Krzyzewski, who had just completed his first season as Duke coach, was in town to evaluate Johnny Dawkins in a 1981 Washington D.C. summer league game, but was convinced to stay for a second game to see Amaker play. Krzyzewski met Amaker's mother and said, "Mrs. Amaker, your son is going to look great in Duke blue." At the time, Amaker had wanted to play for the Maryland Terrapins because his sister Tami went to the University of Maryland, College Park and Amaker idolized Maryland star guard John Lucas. He was recruited eventually to Duke by assistant coach Chuck Swenson, who would later become an assistant coach during Amaker's first five seasons at Michigan from 2001 to 2006.

Amaker played on the 1983 McDonald's All-American Team and was also named to the Parade All-American team. According to the Fairfax Connection, the county changed the rules regarding where teachers could send their children due to Amaker's success at Woodson.

== College career ==
Amaker was a star point guard at Duke after becoming a freshman starter for head coach Krzyzewski. He led the team in assists three years and in steals four seasons. While at Duke his roommate for away games was Mike Brey.

=== Freshman and sophomore years ===
Dawkins played point guard for the 1982–83 Blue Devils, but moved to shooting guard the following year to make way for Amaker. When Amaker joined the 1983–84 Blue Devils, unranked Duke, led by Dawkins and Amaker, won its first seven games, the longest winning streak of fourth-year head coach Krzyzewski's career. Amaker had a field goal accuracy of over 65 percent in those games. He led Duke to the NCAA Tournament during his 1984 freshman and 1985 sophomore seasons, but neither team advanced to the Sweet Sixteen (regional semifinals). In the quarterfinal round of the 1984 ACC men's basketball tournament against the Mark Price-led Georgia Tech Yellow Jackets, Amaker hit the game-winning shot with the score tied and less than 10 seconds left in overtime. In some instances, Amaker's defense changed the game by limiting dribble penetration and forcing low shooting percentages regardless of whether he had notable offensive contributions.

=== Junior year ===
During Amaker's junior year (1985–86), Duke won the inaugural NIT Season Tip-Off (then known as the preseason National Invitation Tournament) and Amaker had nine assists in the championship game against a Danny Manning-led Kansas team. In the March Carolina–Duke rivalry game against North Carolina Amaker stole the ball from Jeff Lebo and made a layup that gave Duke a late first half three-point lead it never surrendered. The win clinched Duke's first regular-season ACC championship since 1966. According to ESPN college basketball color commentator Dick Vitale, Amaker had a reputation for putting pressure on the ball. That year, he helped the team win the 1986 ACC men's basketball tournament, including a championship game victory over the Price-led Georgia Tech.

Duke entered the 1986 NCAA tournament ranked number one with a team that was built around the defensive efforts of its guards, Dawkins and Amaker. In the final four with Duke clinging to a 69–67 lead in a rematch against Kansas, Amaker pulled down the final rebound and sank two clinching free throws in the final five seconds. The win sent Duke to the championship game, giving the team its 21st consecutive victory and an NCAA record 37 single-season victories. Chicago Tribune journalist Robert Markus described Amaker and Dawkins as the best guard combination in the country, although Vitale described Amaker as unknown.

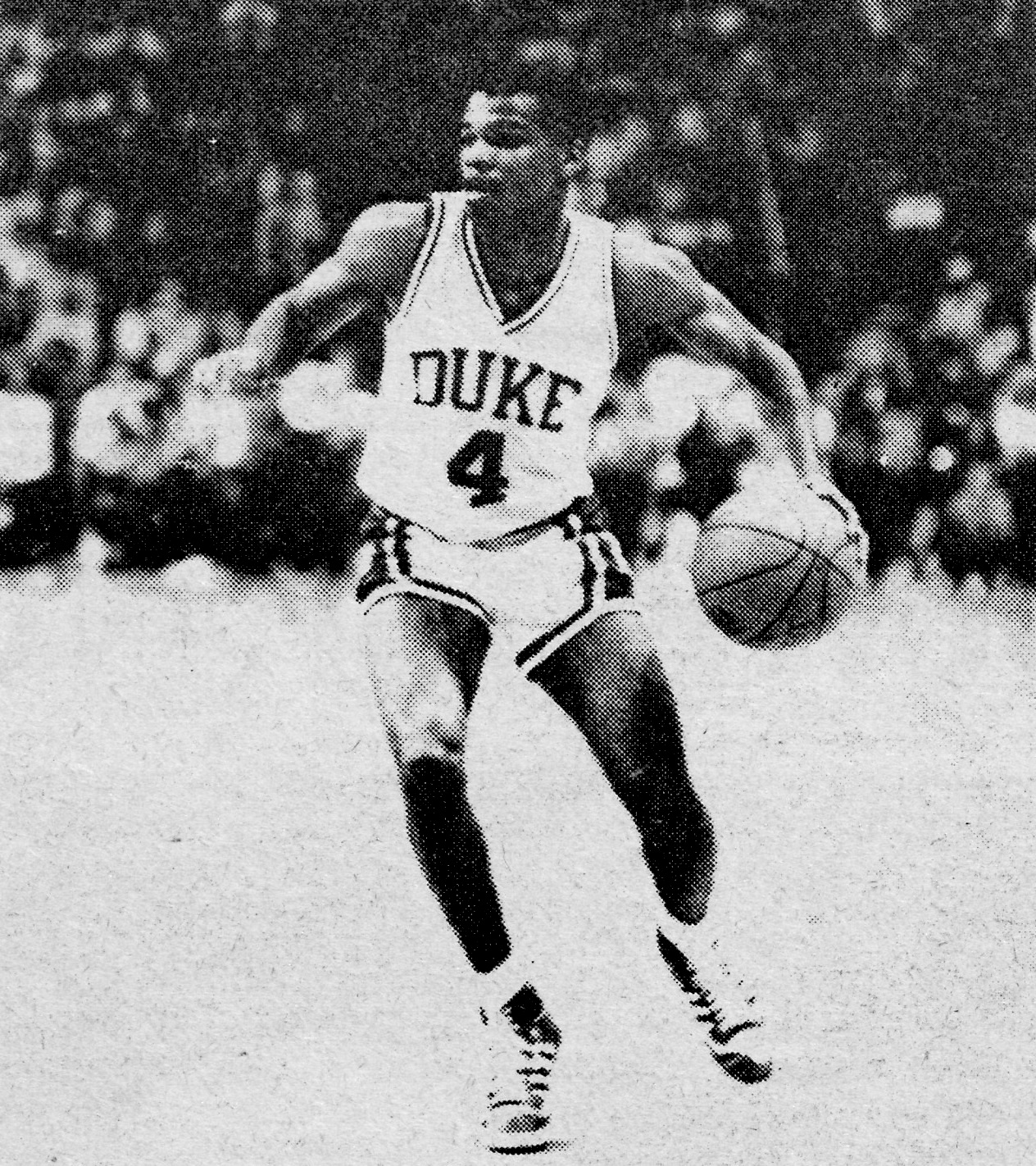
Amaker with Duke in the 1986 NCAA tournament

The 1985–86 Blue Devils finished as national runner-up in the 1986 NCAA tournament to Louisville. That year, Amaker recorded 81 steals, second to Jim Spanarkel at that point in Duke history. He set the career steals record, which stood until Shane Battier broke it in 2001. Amaker also holds the Duke single-year NCAA tournament record with 18 steals in 1986, which had been a tournament record. That year, he had seven steals in two tournament games—against Old Dominion in the second round on March 15 and Louisville in the final on March 31. This seven-steal total stood as the single-game NCAA tournament record for seven years until the 1993 NCAA tournament when Darrell Hawkins had eight for Arkansas against Holy Cross and Grant Hill had eight for Duke against California. The seven steals was a championship game record that was tied by Mookie Blaylock in the 1988 NCAA tournament for Oklahoma against Kansas and was surpassed by Ty Lawson in the 2009 NCAA tournament for North Carolina against Michigan State. Amaker was selected to the 1986 Division I basketball tournament all-NCAA Final Four team. The 1986 Duke team graduated four of its five starters (Dawkins, Mark Alarie, Jay Bilas and David Henderson), leaving Amaker with an inexperienced supporting cast for his senior season. That year, Amaker was a spokesman against drug and alcohol abuse as part of an NCAA-Fiesta Bowl drug education television program.

=== Senior year ===
Muggsy Bogues, Amaker's ACC rival, was his roommate during the July 1986 FIBA World Championship. He played in at least two games in the tournament, the first for a mere two minutes against Puerto Rico, but he played a prominent role in the USA's win over Italy. Amaker won a gold medal while serving on the US national team in the FIBA World Championship, which served as the basketball tournament for the 1986 Goodwill Games.

Senior Amaker served as team captain for the 1986–87 Blue Devils, and he led Duke back to the 1987 NCAA tournament, where they advanced to the Sweet Sixteen before losing to eventual champion Indiana. The key players on the team that year were Amaker and sophomore Danny Ferry. During his senior season, the National Collegiate Athletic Association instituted the three-point field goal. Amaker led Duke in three point shooting that year. He hit a three-point shot with 1:39 remaining in overtime against 17–0 (4–0 ACC) Horace Grant-led Clemson to give Duke the lead for good. A few weeks later, with the score tied in regulation at 60 against Notre Dame and on a two-on-one fast break with 16 seconds left, Amaker took a jump shot. Krzyzewski said Duke lost the game because it did not play as smart as its opponent and Markus described this example in his column. In Amaker's final home game, he made a jump shot with 1:15 remaining that put number seventeen Duke, which made all six of its free throws in the final 45 seconds, ahead for good in its rematch against number thirteen Clemson. In the 1987 tournament he led Duke in scoring in its final two games, including 23 against the Rick Calloway/Keith Smart/Steve Alford-led Indiana, who was coached by Bobby Knight, Krzyzewski's college coach.

That year, the National Association of Basketball Coaches (NABC) awarded Amaker with the first Henry Iba Corinthian Award (also known as the NABC Defensive Player of the Year). Amaker was selected to the 1987 NCAA Men's Basketball All-American third team by the NABC. He was named to the 1987 NCAA Division I men's basketball tournament All-Midwest Regional Team. He was a 1987 All-ACC 2nd-team honoree and earned the team co-MVP award with Ferry that year. Amaker earned a bachelor's degree in economics in 1987 from Duke.

=== Accomplishments ===
Amaker set many Duke career and single-season assists records. He held the record for single-season assists in the years between 1986 and 1990, which was broken by Bobby Hurley. Hurley also broke Amaker's records in career assists per game (5.1, 1987–93) and career assists (708, 1987–92). Steve Wojciechowski broke Amaker's records in single-season assists to turnover ratio (2.88, 1985–97) and career assists to turnover ratio (2.11, 1987–98). Although his single-season assists records were surpassed by Hurley's freshman, sophomore and senior season totals, it still remains a record for a Duke junior. He also held Duke's career NCAA tournament assist average record with 57 in 12 games for a 4.7 average until Hurley surpassed it with 145 in 20 games for a 7.3 average. His school single-game assists record of 14 that he tied (Kevin Billerman, March 2, 1974, vs. North Carolina) vs. Miami on February 19, 1986, was not broken until Hurley's senior 1993 season and is still a record for a junior.

Amaker holds several Duke and ACC records for games played. Amaker, Alarie and Dawkins have all started 40 games for the 1985–86 Duke team and both Ferry and Billy King have played 40 games in a season. Amaker's 138 consecutive games started surpassed Alarie and Dawkins' totals of 133. His 138 consecutive games played was a Duke record until Chris Duhon played 144 in a row ending in 2004. Consecutive games started is not shown in the 2009–10 Atlantic Coast Conference Media Guide records section. However, no ACC player has ever played more than 40 games in a season.

== Pro career ==
Following his college basketball career, Amaker was drafted by the Seattle SuperSonics in the third round of the 1987 NBA draft with the 55th pick overall. He was also drafted in the first round of the April 1987 United States Basketball League's draft by the Staten Island Stallions. He was regarded to be too small to play in the NBA at 6 feet (1.83 m) and 155 pounds (70 kg). He was cut from the SuperSonics team on October 21, 1987. Subsequently, he spent three days with the Wyoming Wildcatters of the Continental Basketball Association in Casper, Wyoming. He quickly decided he wanted to return to Duke to pursue a Master of Business Administration (MBA).

== Coaching career ==
=== Duke ===
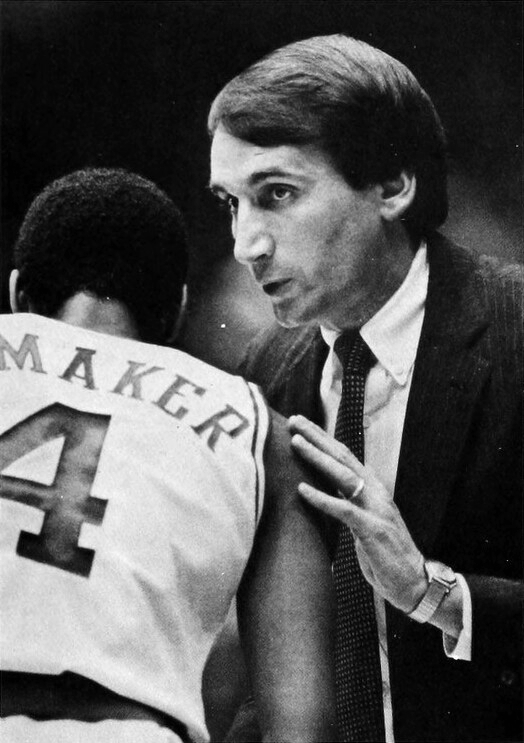
After playing four years for Duke basketball, Amaker returned to serve on the staff of his former coach, Mike Krzyzewski (pictured).

Amaker accepted a graduate assistant position on Krzyzewski's staff at Duke in 1988 while pursuing his MBA degree from the Fuqua School of Business; the team reached the Final Four of the 1989 NCAA tournament. He was an assistant coach from 1989 through 1997, during which Duke won two NCAA Championships (1991 and 1992) and made two other Final Four appearances (1990 and 1994). By 1992, Duke had been to five consecutive final fours. While an assistant coach, he declined numerous Division I head coaching opportunities. Duke also won four regular-season Atlantic Coast Conference men's basketball championships (1991, 1992, 1994 and 1997) and the 1992 ACC men's basketball tournament. The 1994–95 season was turbulent. In October 1994, Krzyzewski underwent back surgery. He attempted to return to coaching two weeks later but eventually was re-admitted to Duke University Hospital for four days in January due to related complications. He eventually relinquished control of the team for the season to interim coach Pete Gaudet.

After Wimp Sanderson was forced out as coach of Alabama in 1992, Amaker was under consideration to replace him. In 1993, he was the leading candidate to assume the head coaching job at Northwestern when Bill Foster stepped aside to serve as interim athletic director, but at age 27, he declined the job when it was offered, noting that he had only been married one year and saying "It boiled down to us looking at a situation where we were extremely flattered, but a situation that wasn't right for us now." That summer Amaker was one of two college basketball members of the 10-man selection committee for the United States Olympic Team. In 1994, he was on the short list to replace Kevin O'Neill, who left Marquette for a job at Tennessee. In 1995, USC was in negotiations to hire Amaker to replace interim coach Charlie Parker, who replaced George Raveling following a car accident. The reason his negotiations with USC failed was compensation since Amaker was both a Duke assistant coach and earned an additional $100,000 (US$211,291 in 2025 dollars) through a summer youth day camp. That summer, Duke promoted Amaker from assistant basketball coach to associate head coach. Krzyzewski returned to coaching in October 1995. USC went on to hire Parker, who did not last a full season as head coach. In 1996, Amaker was rumored to be on the short list to replace interim coach Steve Lavin at UCLA in 1997. When the Northwestern job opened up again in 1997, he was not under consideration because athletic director Rick Taylor sought a candidate with Division I head coaching postseason experience.

=== Seton Hall ===
In 1997, Amaker took the head coaching position at Seton Hall, who had missed the postseason in the two prior years. At 31, Amaker became the youngest head basketball coach in Big East Conference history. Then, he took Seton Hall to the NCAA tournament once (2000)—when his team reached the "Sweet Sixteen"—and to the National Invitation Tournament three times (1998, 1999 and 2001).

The 1997–98 Seton Hall team earned the sixth seed in the 1998 Big East men's basketball tournament, but were ousted in the first round by eleventh-seeded Boston College in overtime in the first round. They ended up in the 1998 National Invitation Tournament where they lost in the first round to Georgia Tech to fall to a final record of 15–15. After returning Seton Hall to the postseason, Amaker was considered for the Michigan job, but they decided to make interim coach Brian Ellerbe a full-time head coach.

Seton Hall's 1998–99 team earned the ninth seed in the 1999 Big East men's basketball tournament. They defeated eighth-seeded Notre Dame in the first round, but lost by one point to top-seeded Connecticut, who went on to win the national championship. They were invited to the 1999 National Invitation Tournament where they lost in the first round to Old Dominion and again finished 15–15.

According to ESPN, Amaker recruited the #2 recruiting class in the nation for the class of 2000 while at Seton Hall. The class consisted of Eddie Griffin (ranked by some as the top high school player in the nation), Andre Barrett and Marcus Toney-El. The Pirates were ranked high on many experts' pre-season rankings. The 1999–2000 Seton Hall team earned the fifth seed in the 2000 Big East men's basketball tournament and earned a victory against twelfth-seeded Providence in the first round, but lost to fourth-seeded Connecticut. The first-round win gave the team 20 victories and no Big East team had achieved that number of victories without getting invited to the NCAA Division I men's basketball tournament in the 21-year history of the conference. They were invited to the 2000 NCAA Division I men's basketball tournament where they were seeded tenth in the East Region. They knocked off seventh-seeded Oregon and second-seeded Temple. In the Sweet Sixteen round they were ousted by third-seeded Oklahoma State and finished with a 22–10 record.

The 2000–01 Pirates earned the Big East West Division's sixth seed in the 2001 Big East men's basketball tournament and beat the East Division three seed St. John's and west two seed Georgetown. They were defeated in the semifinals by east top seed Boston College and ended the year at 16–15. They were invited to the 2001 National Invitation Tournament where they lost in the first round to Alabama. The following season, Amaker resigned as the Seton Hall head coach and became head coach at Michigan, replacing Ellerbe, who had been fired. Amaker met with Michigan athletic director Bill Martin in a hotel lobby instead of renting a room because Martin wanted to save money. Word of the meeting got back to ESPN and the New Jersey press was not kind to Amaker, hinting that he was devious and selfish.

=== Michigan ===
Amaker inherited a Michigan Wolverines men's basketball team that was five years into the investigation of the University of Michigan basketball scandal. The Wolverines opposed Amaker's former mentor Krzyzewski and the 2001–02 Duke Blue Devils in his seventh game as head coach, but his team lost. Although the 2001–02 Wolverines finished at 11–18, Amaker was able to lead the tenth-seeded team to a victory over seventh-seeded Northwestern in the 2002 Big Ten Conference men's basketball tournament before losing to two seed, Ohio State.

Michigan finished the 2002–03 season with a 17–13 record, but sat out both that year's NCAA and NIT tournaments due to the self-imposed postseason ban. The team had banned itself from postseason play before the season started. Nonetheless, over the course of the season the team had earned a three seed and a first-round bye in the 2003 Big Ten Conference men's basketball tournament, but was upset in the second round by Indiana. At the conclusion of the season, the NCAA added a second year of postseason ineligibility to bring the severity of the punishment to a level it deemed more appropriate.

Amaker's 2003–04 team earned a fifth seed and first-round bye in the 2004 Big Ten Conference men's basketball tournament where it defeated fourth-seeded Iowa before losing to top-seeded Illinois. The team experienced successive wins in the 2004 National Invitation Tournament against Missouri, Oklahoma, Hawaii and Oregon. The team won the championship game against Rutgers, giving Amaker his highest single-season victory total up to that point in time with a 23–11 record. Amaker, who has tended to avoid the spotlight, was not on the court as his team celebrated the college basketball tradition of cutting of the nets in celebration of a championship at the 2004 NIT.

The 2004–05 team only achieved a nine seed in the 2005 Big Ten Conference men's basketball tournament when it lost in the first round to eighth-seeded Northwestern. It posted a 13–18 record (4–12 in conference) and finished ninth in the conference.

The Wolverines' 2005–06 team was a high percentage shooting, disciplined and balanced team. It was seeded seventh in the 2006 Big Ten Conference men's basketball tournament but lost to the tenth-seeded Minnesota Golden Gophers. The team had been ranked 37th in the Ratings Percentage Index prior to the game, making them a solid contender for a 2006 NCAA Division I men's basketball tournament invitation. The loss sent them to the 2006 National Invitation Tournament where they were a number one seed, and they finished as the runner-up to South Carolina. Along the way to its runner-up finish, the team defeated ninth-seeded UTEP, fifth-seeded Notre Dame (2OT), third-seeded Miami and fifth-seeded Old Dominion. The team ended with a 22–11 (8–8) record.

Michigan's 2006–07 team earned an eight seed in the 2007 Big Ten Conference men's basketball tournament, when it defeated the ninth-seeded Minnesota Golden Gophers before succumbing to top-seeded Ohio State. After receiving a three seed, Michigan advanced to the second round of the 2007 National Invitation Tournament by beating Utah State before falling to Florida State. The team finished with a 22–13 record yet only 8–8 in conference play.

Amaker was credited for helping to restore the ethical reputation of a Michigan program which had been tarnished by scandal. However, he was criticized in the press for being unable to take the Wolverines to the NCAA tournament in six seasons at the helm. Some fans and sportswriters argued that Amaker's Michigan teams tended to underachieve and fall apart in pressure situations, particularly in conference, on the road and at the end of the regular season. On March 17, 2007, Amaker was fired by the University of Michigan. Amaker was paid $900,000 to buy out the remaining years on his contract.

=== Harvard ===
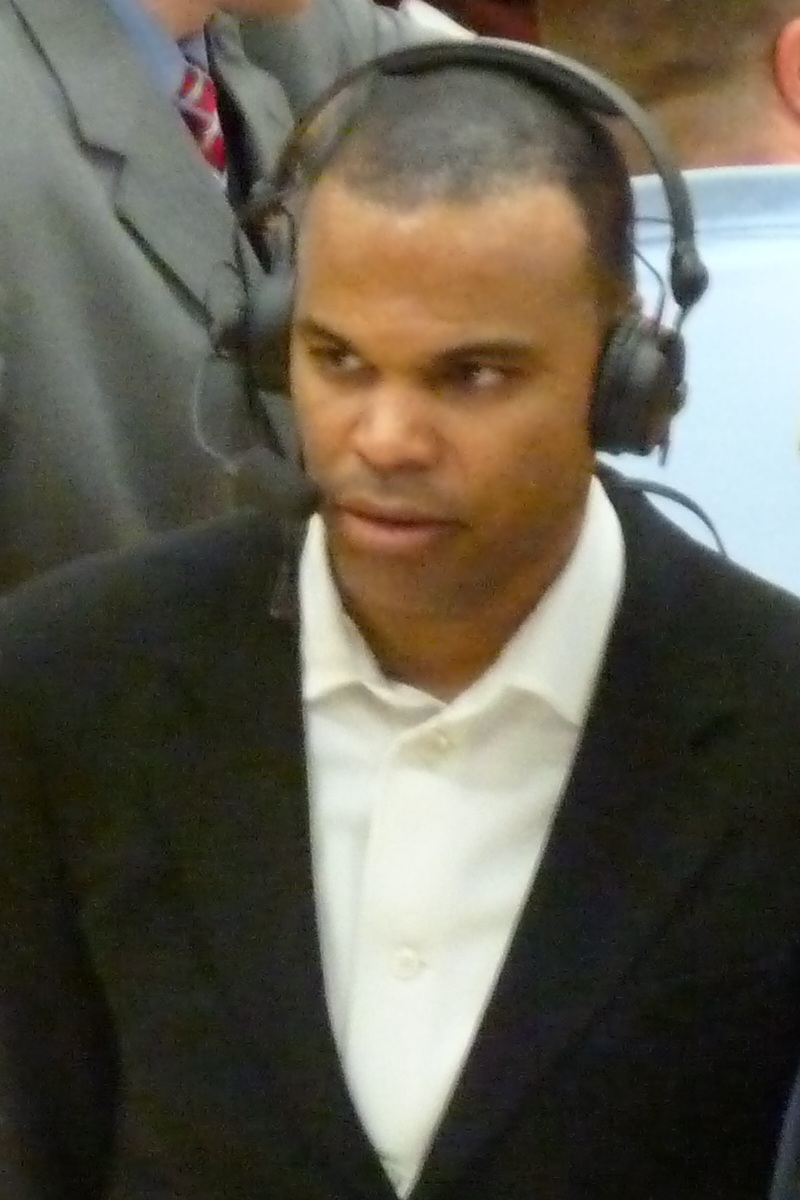
Amaker in 2011

On April 11, 2007, Amaker was named head men's basketball coach at Harvard University. Harvard's recruiting process had included interviewing the underclassmen on the team who preferred Amaker to alternatives that included Mike Jarvis and Mike Gillian. Upon his arrival, Harvard had endured five consecutive non-winning seasons, a streak that Amaker would not halt until his third year. Amaker became the only African American among the head coaches of Harvard's 32 athletic teams. Amaker's Harvard team beat his former team, Michigan, in his eighth game as coach at Harvard during the 2007–08 season. It was the school's first win ever against a BCS conference school.

The New York Times published an accusatory article in March 2008, raising allegations of diminished academic standards among Amaker's first class of recruits and potentially improper recruiting practices. Prodded by this negative publicity, the Ivy League office conducted a four-month investigation and "determined that no violations of NCAA or Ivy League rules occurred", clearing Amaker and his staff completely. Typically, the NCAA would accept the results of a formal investigation performed by a conference office but, in this case, the NCAA initially tabled and then eventually rejected the Ivy League's findings completely. The NCAA commenced its own investigation which ultimately took two years to complete.

Amaker's Harvard squad defeated then-ranked Boston College (#17 AP poll – #24 Coaches' Poll) on January 7, 2009 for the first win over a ranked team in the program's history. His 2008–09 recruiting class was the first time an Ivy League institution was ranked in the top 25 by ESPN.

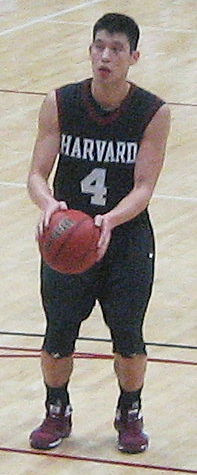
Jeremy Lin led Amaker's 2009–10 Harvard team.

The following season, the 2009–10 Harvard team played competitively against #14 ranked Connecticut getting 30 points and 9 rebounds from senior Jeremy Lin on December 6. Although they held the lead only once, they were within 4 points in the final seconds of the game. They also won their December 9 rematch with Boston College by a 74–67 margin. After coaching Harvard to its highest single-season win total ever behind the play of Lin, Harvard was invited to participate in the 2010 CollegeInsider.com Tournament. The team was defeated in the first round by Appalachian State. During the season, Amaker was a nominee for the first Ben Jobe Award as the top minority Division I college basketball coach, and was recognized by Fox Sports as the 2010 Ivy League Coach of the Year. Amaker was mentioned for the 2010 head coach opening at St. John's.

In the summer of 2010, the NCAA informed Harvard that Amaker's behavior constituted impermissible recruiting behavior. Harvard and the NCAA negotiated a settlement in which the university would "declare" what the NCAA consented to classify as secondary violations. Under the terms of the agreement, Harvard accepted punitive recruiting restrictions for the 2010–11 season. These were the first NCAA penalties ever assessed against the Harvard men's basketball program and the first instance of the Ivy League being overruled on a formal rules interpretation.

Under Amaker's leadership, the 2010–11 team tied with Princeton for the 2010–11 Ivy League men's basketball season championship, which was the school's first men's basketball Ivy League championship since the league was formed in the 1956–57 season. Harvard finished the season a perfect 14–0 at home, which surpassed the prior season's school record of 11 home wins. Harvard's 12 conference game wins established a school record. The team's victory over Colorado was the Crimson's first against a Big 12 Conference opponent since that conference commenced play in 1996. His fourth season also marked the fourth straight season that Harvard defeated at least one power conference opponent. Although Harvard never appeared in the 2010–11 NCAA Division I men's basketball rankings, for a few weeks during the season they received a vote in the AP poll. On March 7, Harvard received a vote in both the AP poll and the Coaches' Poll. Harvard faced Ivy League co-champion Princeton in a one-game playoff and lost by a 63–62 margin. Princeton earned the 2011 NCAA Division I men's basketball tournament automatic bid, while Harvard earned an at-large bid to the 2011 National Invitation Tournament, marking the school's first appearance in the National Invitation Tournament. On March 15, Harvard was defeated by Oklahoma State by a 71–54 margin in the first round. The final record of 23–7 established a school record for number of wins, surpassing the prior season's total of 21. Amaker was again a finalist for the Ben Jobe Award, was a finalist for the Hugh Durham Award and was selected by the NABC as the District 13 Coach of the Year. He was named Ivy League coach of the year by Collegeinsider.com.

The 2011–12 Harvard team defeated then-ranked Florida State (#22 AP poll – #20 Coaches' Poll) on November 25, 2011 for the school's second win over a ranked team in the program's history, and the highest-ranked opponent in the Coaches' Poll that Harvard had defeated up to that point. On December 5, 2011, Harvard made its first appearance in either the AP poll (25) or Coaches' Poll (24). It left Brown as the only remaining Ivy League school to have never been ranked in the AP poll and leaves only seven schools that have played Division I basketball since the AP poll began that have never been ranked in it. Harvard was the first Ivy League team ranked in the Coaches' Poll since the 2009–10 Cornell Big Red and the first Ivy League team ranked in the AP poll since the 1997–98 Princeton Tigers, who finished 8th in the poll. By January 2, the team achieved rankings of 22 in the AP poll and 21 in the Coaches' Poll. The team was also ranked 21st in the Coaches' Poll on February 6. The team established a new record for single-season wins as well as single-season non-league wins and tied the record for conference game wins. Amaker was selected by the U.S. Basketball Writers Association as the 2011–12 Men's District I (ME, VT, NH, RI, MA, CT) Coach of the Year. He won the NABC Coach of the Year for District 13 and was again a finalist for both the Ben Jobe Award and the Hugh Durham Award. On March 6, 2012, Harvard earned its first bid to the NCAA tournament since 1946.

On October 6, 2012, Amaker was inducted into his high school's inaugural hall of fame class. Amaker's 2012–13 Harvard team entered the season affected by the 2012 Harvard cheating scandal. Instead of being the favorite as originally expected, the team was predicted to finish second to Princeton by various media sources because Kyle Casey and Brandyn Curry withdrew due to the scandal. Casey and Curry had been first-team and second-team All-Ivy selections for the 2011–12 Ivy League men's basketball season, respectively. Both players withdrew in hopes of preserving their final year of athletic eligibility following the investigation. During the season, the team defeated Boston College—its fifth consecutive victory against them—making Amaker a perfect 6–0 against the Atlantic Coast Conference. The 2012–13 Harvard team overcame the withdrawal of its senior co-captains to repeat as 2013 Ivy League champions, which earned Harvard a trip to the 2013 NCAA Division I men's basketball tournament. On March 21, 14th-seeded Harvard earned the school's first NCAA tournament victory by a 68–62 margin and its first victory over a top 10 opponent when it defeated 3rd-seeded New Mexico (#10 AP poll – #10 Coaches' Poll). Two nights later, Harvard lost to Arizona 74–51. Following the season, Amaker was inducted into the New England Basketball Hall of Fame class of 2013. Amaker won the National Sportscasters and Sportswriters Association (NSSA) Clarence "Big House" Gaines College Basketball Coach of the Year in Division I as the top minority coach, the NABC Coach of the Year for District 13 and was again a finalist for the Ben Jobe Award. In August, Amaker was inducted into his fourth Hall of Fame (Washington Metro Basketball Hall of Fame).

The 2013–14 team won the 2013 Great Alaska Shootout and 2013–14 Ivy League conference regular-season championship with a 13–1 record and posting a school-record 27 wins against five defeats. The team entered the 2014 NCAA Division I men's basketball tournament with a number twelve seed where it defeated a (#15 AP poll – #14 Coaches' Poll) Cincinnati team that was seeded fifth. Harvard eventually lost to number (#11/13) four seed Michigan State. The team was the first Ivy League school to win games in consecutive NCAA Division I men's basketball tournaments since the 1983–84 Princeton Tigers.

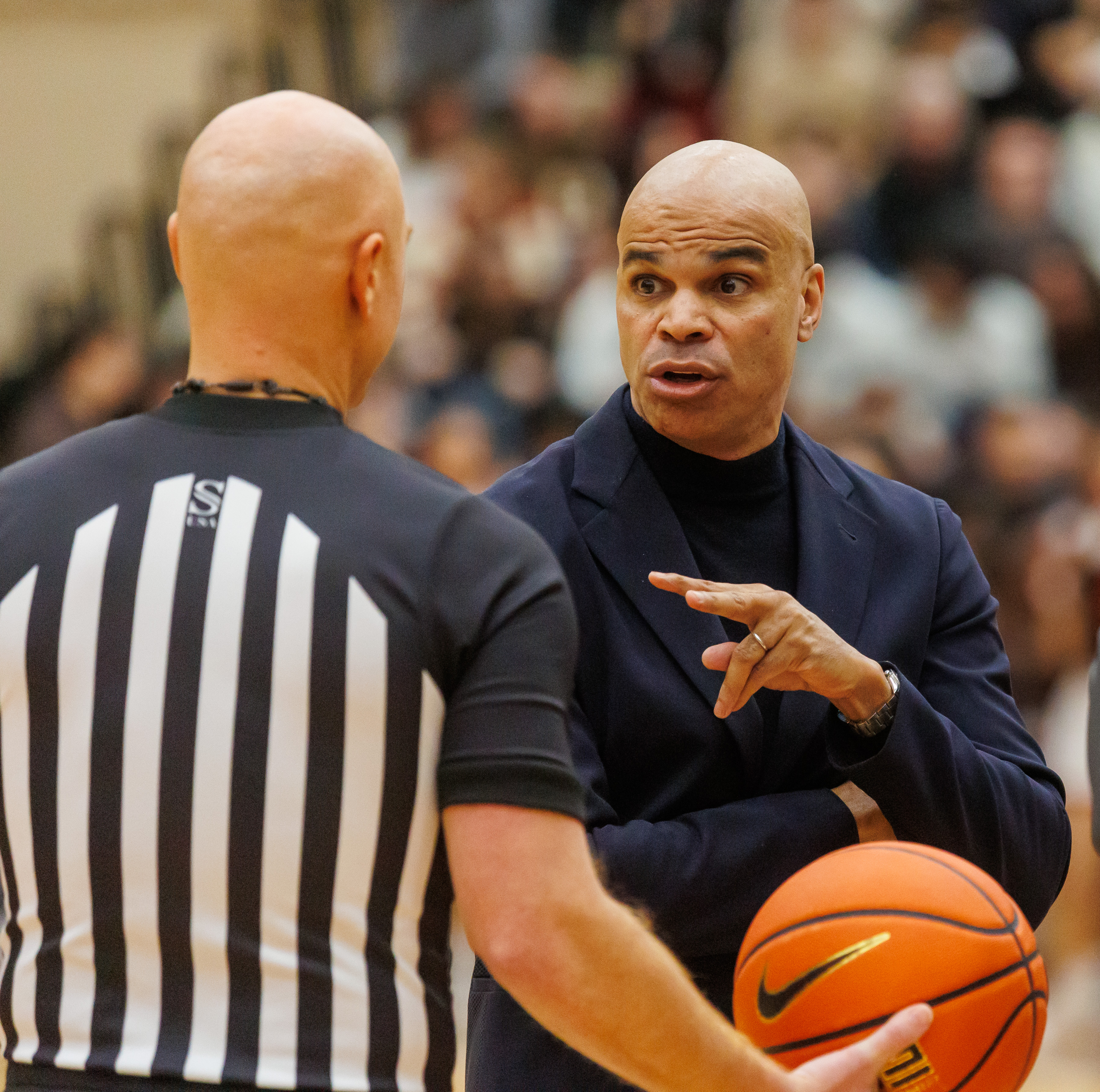
Amaker speaking with a referee

The 2014–15 team was the first Ivy League team to make a fifth consecutive postseason appearance since the 2001–02 Princeton Tigers men's basketball team completed a seven-year run for Princeton. They were the third Ivy team to make four consecutive NCAA basketball tournament appearances, a feat last accomplished by the 1991–92 Princeton Tigers men's basketball team.

On December 7, 2016, in a rivalry contest against Boston College, Amaker earned his 179th win with the 2016–17 team, surpassing Frank Sullivan as Harvard's all-time winningest coach. Amaker led the 2017–18 Harvard Crimson to a share of the 2017–18 Ivy League regular-season title. The team reached the championship game of the 2018 Ivy League men's basketball tournament, but lost to Penn earning an automatic bid to the 2018 National Invitation Tournament.

In addition to his coaching duties at Harvard, Amaker served as a Special Assistant to Harvard University President Larry Bacow and a Spring 2021 Fellow at the Hauser Center for Public Leadership at the Harvard Kennedy School. In February 2021, he was named as a Champion of Diversity by the NCAA.

== Personal life ==
Amaker is married to Stephanie Pinder-Amaker, who is a licensed clinical psychologist. The couple met at Duke. Amaker's grandmother is Annie Deskins. Amaker's mother, Alma, continued to make him the sauce for his favorite meal of spaghetti and express mail it to him from her home in Falls Church, Virginia, during his career at least until his days at Michigan. According to Duke teammate Bilas, Amaker was quite fashion-conscious and attempted to be a trendsetter.

At Michigan, his daily routine included breakfast at a local hotel where he read USA Today. At Harvard, once a month, he convenes The Breakfast Club at the Cambridge, Massachusetts, restaurant Henrietta's Table with a group of noted African-American scholars and businessmen led by Harvard Law School professor Charles Ogletree to discuss sociopolitical issues. Amaker is known for his trademark mock turtleneck shirts, each of which has his initials monogrammed into the collar, and for wearing a sports coat at each news conference. Unlike most of his peers, Amaker avoids the press and will not do a radio or television show.

Amaker was enshrined in the Duke Athletic Hall of Fame in 2001. He was a member of the board of directors for USA Basketball. During his time on the board he served as a member of the Men's Collegiate and Men's Senior National Committees, where he helped select members of the United States 1996 Olympic gold medal team. Amaker owns two vintage Mercedes-Benz cars, which were featured in an article in The Star magazine, and is a Washington Commanders fan.

On August 30, 2026, Amaker was inducted into the Washington DC Sports Hall of Fame.

== Head coaching record ==
Record table
Season	Team	Overall	Conference	Standing	Postseason
Seton Hall Pirates (Big East Conference) (1997–2001)
1997–98	Seton Hall	15–15	9–9	3rd (BE 7)	NIT First Round
1998–99	Seton Hall	15–15	8–10	T–8th	NIT First Round
1999–00	Seton Hall	22–10	10–6	T–4th	NCAA Division I Sweet 16
2000–01	Seton Hall	16–15	5–11	6th (West)	NIT First Round
Seton Hall:		68–55 (.553)	32–36 (.471)		
Michigan Wolverines (Big Ten Conference) (2001–2007)
2001–02	Michigan	11–18	5–11	T–8th	
2002–03	Michigan	18–12	10–6	T–3rd	
2003–04	Michigan	23–11	8–8	T–5th	NIT Champion
2004–05	Michigan	13–18	4–12	9th	
2005–06	Michigan	22–11	8–8	T–6th	NIT Runner-Up
2006–07	Michigan	22–13	8–8	T–7th	NIT Second Round
Michigan:		109–83 (.568)	43–53 (.448)		
Harvard Crimson (Ivy League) (2007–present)
2007–08	Harvard	8–22	3–11	T–6th	
2008–09	Harvard	14–14	6–8	T–6th	
2009–10	Harvard	21–7	10–4	3rd	CIT First Round
2010–11	Harvard	23–7	12–2	T–1st	NIT First Round
2011–12	Harvard	26–5	12–2	1st	NCAA Division I Round of 64
2012–13	Harvard	20–10	11–3	1st	NCAA Division I Round of 32
2013–14	Harvard	27–5	13–1	1st	NCAA Division I Round of 32
2014–15	Harvard	22–8	11–3	T–1st	NCAA Division I Round of 64
2015–16	Harvard	14–16	6–8	4th	
2016–17	Harvard	18–10	10–4	2nd	
2017–18	Harvard	18–14	12–2	T–1st	NIT First Round
2018–19	Harvard	19–12	10–4	T–1st	NIT Second Round
2019–20	Harvard	20–7	10–4	2nd	
2020–21	Harvard (Note: Harvard did not play in the 2020–21 school year due to COVID-19 concerns.)				
2021–22	Harvard	13–13	5–9	T–6th	
2022–23	Harvard	14–14	5–9	7th	
2023–24	Harvard	14–13	5–9	5th	
2024–25	Harvard	12–15	7–7	5th	
2025–26	Harvard	17–12	10–4	2nd	
2026–27	Harvard	3–4	0–0		
Harvard:		324–210 (.607)	158–94 (.627)		
Total:		500–349 (.589)			
National champion Postseason invitational champion Conference regular season champion Conference regular season and conference tournament champion Division regular season champion Division regular season and conference tournament champion Conference tournament champion
