= 2000–01 Syracuse Orangemen basketball team =

American college basketball season

2000–01 Syracuse Orangemen men's basketball

Great Alaska Shootout champion

NCAA tournament, Second round
- Conference: Big East Conference
- West Division

Ranking
- Coaches: No. 18
- AP: No. 17
- Record: 25–9 (10–6 Big East)
- Head coach: Jim Boeheim (25th season)
- Assistant coaches: Bernie Fine (25th season); Mike Hopkins (6th season); Prosper çell (1st season)
- Home arena: Carrier Dome

2000–01 Big East men's basketball standings
	Conf.				Overall
Team	W		L	PCT	W		L	PCT
East
No. 7 Boston College †	13	–	3	.813	27	–	5	.844
Providence	11	–	5	.688	21	–	10	.677
St. John's#	8	–	8	.500	5	–	15	.250
Miami	8	–	8	.500	16	–	13	.552
Villanova	8	–	8	.500	18	–	13	.581
Connecticut	8	–	8	.500	20	–	12	.625
Virginia Tech*	2	–	14	.125	8	–	19	.296
West
No. 19 Notre Dame	11	–	5	.688	20	–	10	.667
No. 21 Georgetown	10	–	6	.625	25	–	8	.758
No. 17 Syracuse	10	–	6	.625	25	–	9	.735
West Virginia	8	–	8	.500	17	–	12	.586
Pittsburgh	7	–	9	.438	19	–	14	.576
Seton Hall	5	–	11	.313	16	–	15	.516
Rutgers*	3	–	13	.188	11	–	16	.407
† 2001 Big East tournament winner As of April 2, 2001; Rankings from AP Poll #St. John's had 9 regular-season games vacated due to sanctions against the program; the school′s disputed record was 8–8, 14–15. *Did not qualify for 2001 Big East tournament.

The 2000–01 Syracuse Orangemen basketball team represented Syracuse University during the 2000–01 NCAA men's basketball season.

== Roster ==
2000–01 Syracuse Orange men's basketball team
Players
Coaches

Pos.	#	Name	Height	Weight	Year	Hometown
G/F	3	Preston Shumpert	6 ft 6 in (1.98 m)	195 lb (88 kg)	Jr	Fort Walton Beach, Florida
G	13	Kueth Duany	6 ft 4 in (1.93 m)	190 lb (86 kg)	So	Bloomington, Indiana
F	25	Damone Brown	6 ft 8 in (2.03 m)	202 lb (92 kg)	Sr	Buffalo, New York

Head coach

- Jim Boeheim (Syracuse)

Assistant coach(es)

- Bernie Fine (Syracuse)
- Mike Hopkins (Syracuse)

Legend

- (C) Team captain
- (S) Suspended
- (I) Ineligible
- (W) Walk-on
- Injured
- Current redshirt

Roster

== Schedule and results ==
Date time, TV	Rank^{#}	Opponent^{#}	Result	Record	High points	High rebounds	High assists	Site (attendance) city, state
November 19, 2000*		St. Francis (NY)	W 73–53	1-0	–	–	–	Carrier Dome (17,730); Syracuse, NY
November 23, 2000*		vs. DePaul; Great Alaska Shootout	W 92–84	2-0	–	–	–	Sullivan Arena (7,556); Anchorage, AK
November 24, 2000*		vs. Ohio State; Great Alaska Shootout	W 77–66	3-0	–	–	–	Sullivan Arena (8,034); Anchorage, AK
November 25, 2000*		vs. Missouri; Great Alaska Shootout	W 84–62	4-0	–	–	–	Sullivan Arena (8,700); Anchorage, AK
November 28, 2000*	No. 20	Colgate	W 73–65	5-0	–	–	–	Carrier Dome (17,066); Syracuse, NY
December 1, 2000*	No. 20	Akron	W 81–51	6-0	–	–	–	Carrier Dome (16,893); Syracuse, NY
December 2, 2000	No. 20	Virginia Tech	W 88–68	7-0	–	–	–	Carrier Dome (18,409); Syracuse, NY
December 5, 2000*	No. 13	Albany	W 105–75	8-0	–	–	–	Carrier Dome (16,285); Syracuse, NY
December 16, 2000*	No. 12	Wisconsin–Green Bay	W 69–57	9-0	–	–	–	Carrier Dome (18,105); Syracuse, NY
December 22, 2000*; ESPN	No. 12	No. 4 Tennessee	L 70–83	9-1	–	–	–	Carrier Dome (23,164); Syracuse, NY
December 28, 2000*	No. 15	Columbia	W 61–47	10-1	–	–	–	Carrier Dome (16,203); Syracuse, NY
December 30, 2000*	No. 15	Niagara	W 95–69	11-1	–	–	–	Carrier Dome (16,579); Syracuse, NY
January 2, 2001	No. 14	Notre Dame	W 79–70	12-1	–	–	–	Carrier Dome (17,368); Syracuse, NY
January 6, 2001	No. 14	at Pittsburgh	W 71–66	13-1	–	–	–	Fitzgerald Field House (6,798); Pittsburgh, PA
January 9, 2001	No. 11	at Rutgers	W 64–63	14-1	–	–	–	Louis Brown Center (7,013); Piscataway, NJ
January 13, 2001	No. 11	West Virginia	W 86–80	15-1	–	–	–	Carrier Dome (20,495); Syracuse, NY
January 21, 2001	No. 8	at Seton Hall	L 65–77	15-2	–	–	–	(15,086); East Rutherford, NJ
January 23, 2001	No. 11	at Notre Dame	L 60–74	15-3	–	–	–	Joyce Center (11,120); South Bend, IN
January 27, 2001	No. 11	Rutgers	W 68–54	16-3	–	–	–	Carrier Dome; Syracuse, NY
January 29, 2001	No. 11	Georgetown; Rivalry	W 70–63	17-3	–	–	–	Carrier Dome (21,054); Syracuse, NY
February 3, 2001*; 1:00, CBS	No. 12	at NC State	W 54–53	18-3	–	–	–	(16,494); Raleigh, NC
February 7, 2001	No. 9	at Boston College	L 63–65	18-4	–	–	–	Conte Forum (8,606); Chestnut Hill, MA
February 10, 2001	No. 9	Seton Hall	W 63–62	19-4	–	–	–	Carrier Dome (29,453); Syracuse, NY
February 13, 2001	No. 10	Miami (FL)	L 57–68	19-5	–	–	–	Carrier Dome (18,395); Syracuse, NY
February 17, 2001	No. 10	at West Virginia	L 76–87	19-6	–	–	–	WVU Coliseum (12,389); Morgantown, WV
February 19, 2001	No. 10	Connecticut	W 65–60	20-6	–	–	–	Carrier Dome (22,082); Syracuse, NY
February 24, 2001	No. 17	Georgetown; Rivalry	L 61–72	20-7	–	–	–	MCI Center (18,189); Washington, D.C.
February 27, 2001	No. 19	Pittsburgh	W 80–69	21-7	–	–	–	Carrier Dome (18,721); Syracuse, NY
March 4, 2001; 12:00, CBS	No. 19	at St. John's	W 93–91	22-7	–	–	–	Madison Square Garden (18,401); New York, NY
March 7, 2001*	No. 17	vs. Connecticut; Big East tournament	W 86–75	23-7	–	–	–	Madison Square Garden (19,528); New York, NY
March 8, 2001*	No. 17	vs. Providence; Big East tournament	W 55–54	24-7	–	–	–	Madison Square Garden (19,528); New York, NY
March 9, 2001*	No. 17	vs. Pittsburgh; Big East tournament	L 54–55	24-8	–	–	–	Madison Square Garden (19,528); New York, NY
March 16, 2001*; CBS	(MW5) No. 17	vs. (MW12) Hawaii; First Round	W 79–69	25-8	–	–	–	(13,133); Dayton, OH
March 18, 2001*; CBS	(MW5) No. 17	vs. (MW4) Kansas; Second Round	L 58–87	25-9	–	–	–	(13,159); Dayton, OH
*Non-conference game. ^{#}Rankings from AP Poll. (#) Tournament seedings in parentheses. MW=Midwest.
