= 2000–01 Miami Hurricanes men's basketball team =

American college basketball season

2000–01 Miami Hurricanes men's basketball

NIT, 1st round
- Conference: Atlantic Coast Conference
- Record: 16-13 (8-8 Big East)
- Head coach: Perry Clark
- Home arena: Miami Arena

2000–01 Big East men's basketball standings
	Conf.				Overall
Team	W		L	PCT	W		L	PCT
East
No. 7 Boston College †	13	–	3	.813	27	–	5	.844
Providence	11	–	5	.688	21	–	10	.677
St. John's#	8	–	8	.500	5	–	15	.250
Miami	8	–	8	.500	16	–	13	.552
Villanova	8	–	8	.500	18	–	13	.581
Connecticut	8	–	8	.500	20	–	12	.625
Virginia Tech*	2	–	14	.125	8	–	19	.296
West
No. 19 Notre Dame	11	–	5	.688	20	–	10	.667
No. 21 Georgetown	10	–	6	.625	25	–	8	.758
No. 17 Syracuse	10	–	6	.625	25	–	9	.735
West Virginia	8	–	8	.500	17	–	12	.586
Pittsburgh	7	–	9	.438	19	–	14	.576
Seton Hall	5	–	11	.313	16	–	15	.516
Rutgers*	3	–	13	.188	11	–	16	.407
† 2001 Big East tournament winner As of April 2, 2001; Rankings from AP Poll #St. John's had 9 regular-season games vacated due to sanctions against the program; the school′s disputed record was 8–8, 14–15. *Did not qualify for 2001 Big East tournament.

The 2000–01 Miami Hurricanes men's basketball team represented the University of Miami during the 2000–01 NCAA Division I men's basketball season. The Hurricanes, led by head coach Perry Clark, played their home games at the Miami Arena and were members of the Big East Conference.

On December 15, 2000, Nebraska defeated Miami in the 2000 Orange Bowl Basketball Classic, 72-64.

The Hurricanes finished the season with a 16–13 record. They lost to Pittsburgh 78–69 in the Big East tournament first round. In the NIT 1st round Miami lost 60–58 to Auburn on March 14, 2001.
