= Al Skinner =

American basketball player and coach (born 1952)

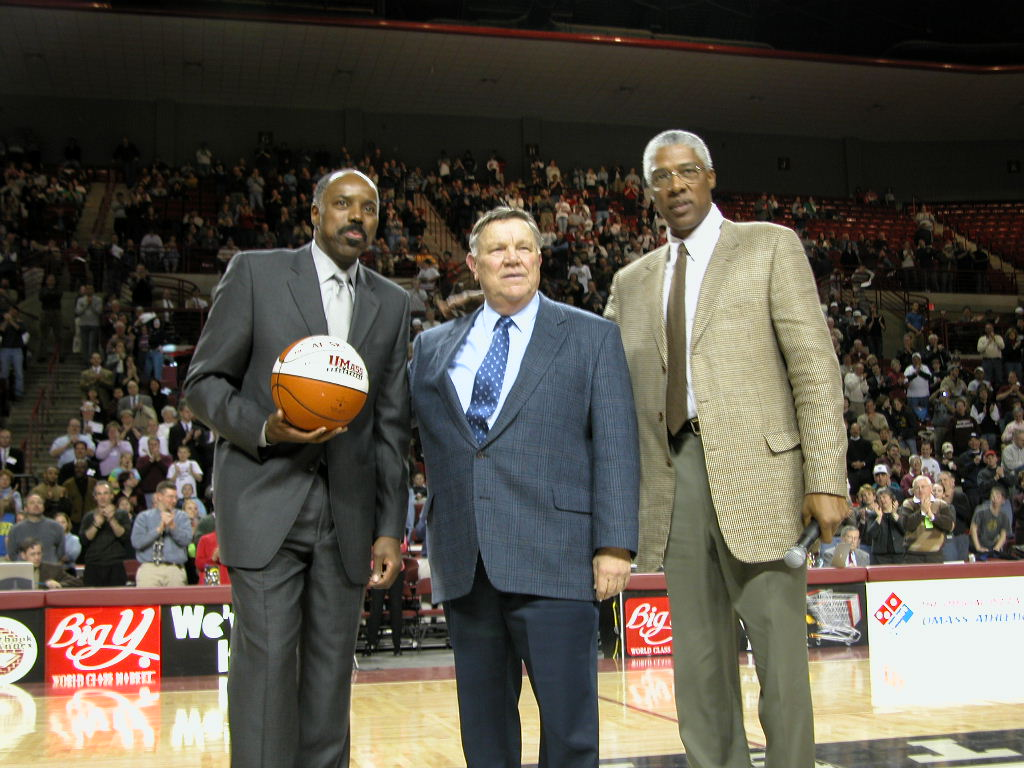
- Left to right: Al Skinner, Jack Leaman, and Julius Erving at the ceremony to retire Skinner's UMass jersey, 2004

Personal information
- Born: June 16, 1952 (age 74) Mount Vernon, New York, U.S.
- Listed height: 6 ft 3 in (1.91 m)
- Listed weight: 190 lb (86 kg)

Career information
- High school: Malverne (Malverne, New York)
- College: UMass (1971–1974)
- NBA draft: 1974: 9th round, 160th overall pick
- Drafted by: Boston Celtics
- Playing career: 1974–1981
- Position: Shooting guard
- Number: 30, 35
- Coaching career: 1982–2019

Career history

Playing
- 1974–1977: New York/New Jersey Nets
- 1977–1978: Detroit Pistons
- 1978–1979: New Jersey Nets
- 1979–1980: Philadelphia 76ers
- 1980–1981: Joventut Badalona

Coaching
- 1982–1984: Marist (assistant)
- 1984–1988: Rhode Island (assistant)
- 1988–1997: Rhode Island
- 1997–2010: Boston College
- 2013–2015: Bryant (assistant)
- 2015–2019: Kennesaw State

Career highlights
- As player: ABA champion (1976); 3× First-team All-Yankee (1972–1974); No. 30 retired by UMass Minutemen; As coach: 2× Big East regular season champion (2001, 2005); Big East tournament champion (2001); Henry Iba Award (2001); 2× Big East Coach of the Year (2001, 2005); Atlantic 10 Coach of the Year (1992)
- Stats at NBA.com
- Stats at Basketball Reference

Albert Lee Skinner Jr. (born June 16, 1952) is an American men's college basketball head coach and a former collegiate and professional basketball player. He was formerly the head coach of the Boston College Eagles men's basketball team and was then an assistant at Bryant University before becoming the head coach of Kennesaw State University in 2015.

== Playing career ==
=== College ===
Skinner played at the University of Massachusetts. While on the freshman team in the 1970–71 season, the varsity team was led by Julius Erving, in what would be Erving's final season in college. (Skinner and Erving would later play together professionally.) Skinner was also a teammate of Rick Pitino.

Skinner scored 1,235 points in his three years on the varsity squad. He led the team in rebounding each of those three years, and in scoring in his junior and senior seasons. As a senior, he averaged a double-double with 18.8 points and 11.0 rebounds. That scoring average also led the Yankee Conference. He recorded the first triple-double in UMass history, with 28 points, 18 rebounds and 10 assists against St. Peter's on December 28, 1973, in Springfield MA.

Skinner was a three-time Yankee Conference First Team selection. He led UMass to two straight YC titles in the 1972–73 and 1973–74 seasons. As a senior in 1973–74, he was the team captain and an All-America honorable mention selection.

His jersey number 30 was retired in a ceremony at UMass on February 18, 2004.

=== Professional ===
Skinner was drafted by the Boston Celtics in the 1974 NBA draft (16th pick of the 9th round, or 160th overall pick). He never ended up playing with Boston. Instead, he joined the New York Nets in the ABA, where he reunited with Julius Erving. The pair helped the Nets win the ABA title in 1975–76.

In his total ABA/NBA career, he spent time with the Nets (1974–77, 1978–79), Pistons (1977–78) and 76ers (1979–80).

An odd footnote to Skinner's career is that he is the only player in NBA history to earn a DNP for both teams in the same game. In a game against the Philadelphia 76ers on November 8, 1978, Skinner's Nets lost in overtime. However, the result was protested by New Jersey due to a total of six technical fouls being called on Bernard King and coach Kevin Loughery by referee Richie Powers, with both men receiving three each. Per the rules, only two technical fouls could be called against any individual player or coach; as such, the protest was upheld and the game was ordered to be replayed from the point where King and Loughery were ejected. Before this could happen, the Nets and 76ers made a trade where Skinner and Eric Money were swapped for Harvey Catchings and Ralph Simpson; this mean that, when the teams returned to finish the protested game on March 23, 1979, the four players were noted in the stat sheets for both teams with Skinner not playing for the 76ers in the return contest.

== Coaching career ==
=== Marist and Rhode Island ===
After retiring from his playing career, Skinner entered the college coaching ranks. He served as an assistant coach at Marist from 1982 to 1984, and then at the University of Rhode Island from 1984 to 1988.

He was named head coach at URI beginning with the 1988–89 season, replacing Tom Penders. Skinner coached the Rams for nine seasons, during which he won the Atlantic 10 Coach of the Year award for the 1991–92 season. He is also credited for recruiting many of the players of the Rams' 1997–98 team – Cuttino Mobley and Tyson Wheeler – which reached the Elite Eight of the 1998 NCAA tournament.

During Skinner's tenure, the Rams were selected to two NITs and two NCAA Tournaments. He was inducted into URI's Athletic Hall of Fame in 2000.

=== Boston College ===
On April 17, 1997, Skinner was hired to lead Boston College after Jim O'Brien left for Ohio State. Nearly all of the Eagles' prominent players followed O'Brien to Ohio State, leaving Skinner with a depleted roster. As a result, the Eagles struggled for Skinner's first three seasons in Chestnut Hill, winning only 12 games in Big East play and 32 overall.

After the Eagles struggled in Skinner's first three seasons in Chestnut Hill, he guided the 2000–01 team to the Big East regular season title with a 13–3 record—their first regular season title in 18 years. The Eagles went on to win the Big East tournament, and earned a #3 seed in the NCAA tournament. He was named the season's Coach of the Year both Nationally and in the Big East.

In the 2004–05 season, the Eagles became the first Big East team in history to start a season 20–0. The Eagles were ranked #4 in the AP Poll at the time, and even reached as high as #3 later in the season. Though they won the conference regular season title, the Eagles fell in the Quarter-Finals of the Big East tournament. As a #4 seed in the 2005 NCAA tournament, they were upset by #12 seed Milwaukee. Skinner was named Big East Coach of the Year in 2004–05.

The 2005–06 Eagles finished with a 28–8 record, which stands as the most wins in a single season in BC history. They also advanced to the Sweet 16, tying the second-deepest NCAA run for an Eagle team. During the season, Skinner also became the all-time winningest coach in BC history, surpassing O'Brien's 168 wins.

Through the 2009–10 season, Skinner led Boston College to seven NCAA Tournaments, and one NIT.

On March 30, 2010, Skinner was fired as head coach at Boston College following only his second losing season of the millennium.

Almost a year to the day after his firing, Skinner took part in a phone interview with Boston Globe sportswriter Mark Blaudschun. Ending a year of self-imposed silence about what transpired at Boston College, Skinner defended his record, stating, "I ran a good program, I graduated my kids. Everybody has problems, but we addressed them and handled them in a matter that satisfied every one." Skinner continued the interview by saying that he felt that, had he been at BC during the 2010–11 season, the Eagles would have been more of a factor in the national picture. "I know the potential we had", he said. "We would have had a dog in this fight, and that we don’t bothers me." His remarks, and the fact that his interview ran on the front page of the Sports section of The Boston Globe, demonstrated the ongoing controversy regarding his firing in March 2010.

=== Bryant ===
In 2013, Skinner joined the staff of his former assistant coach, Tim O'Shea, as an assistant coach at Bryant University, and his first coaching job since being let go at Boston College.

=== Kennesaw State ===
On April 26, 2015, Skinner was named the sixth head coach in school history at Kennesaw State, replacing Jimmy Lallathin.

On February 21, 2019, Skinner announced his resignation from Kennesaw State effective at the end of the season.

== Head coaching record ==
Record table
Season	Team	Overall	Conference	Standing	Postseason
Rhode Island Rams (Atlantic 10 Conference) (1988–1997)
1988–89	Rhode Island	13–15	9–9	5th	
1989–90	Rhode Island	15–13	11–7	4th	
1990–91	Rhode Island	11–17	6–12	9th	
1991–92	Rhode Island	22–10	9–7	4th	NIT Quarterfinal
1992–93	Rhode Island	19–11	8–6	5th	NCAA Division I Second Round
1993–94	Rhode Island	11–16	7–9	6th	
1994–95	Rhode Island	7–20	2–14	9th	
1995–96	Rhode Island	20–14	8–8	4th (East)	NIT Quarterfinal
1996–97	Rhode Island	20–10	12–4	2nd (East)	NCAA Division I First Round
Rhode Island:		138–126	72–76		
Boston College Eagles (Big East Conference) (1997–2005)
1997–98	Boston College	15–16	6–12	6th (BE 6)	
1998–99	Boston College	6–21	3–15	13th	
1999–00	Boston College	11–19	3–13	13th	
2000–01	Boston College	27–5	13–3	1st (East)	NCAA Division I Second Round
2001–02	Boston College	20–12	8–8	4th (East)	NCAA Division I First Round
2002–03	Boston College	19–12	10–6	1st (East)	NIT First Round
2003–04	Boston College	24–10	10–6	5th	NCAA Division I Second Round
2004–05	Boston College	25–5	13–3	1st	NCAA Division I Second Round
Boston College Eagles (Atlantic Coast Conference) (2005–2010)
2005–06	Boston College	28–8	11–5	3rd	NCAA Division I Sweet 16
2006–07	Boston College	21–12	10–6	4th	NCAA Division I Second Round
2007–08	Boston College	14–17	4–12	11th	
2008–09	Boston College	22–12	9–7	6th	NCAA Division I First Round
2009–10	Boston College	15–16	6–10	8th	
Boston College:		247–165	106–106		
Kennesaw State Owls (ASUN Conference) (2015–2019)
2015–16	Kennesaw State	11–20	7–7	T–5th	
2016–17	Kennesaw State	14–18	7–7	T–4th	
2017–18	Kennesaw State	10–20	6–8	6th	
2018–19	Kennesaw State	6–26	3–13	T–8th	
Kennesaw State:		41–84	23–35		
Total:		426–375			
National champion Postseason invitational champion Conference regular season champion Conference regular season and conference tournament champion Division regular season champion Division regular season and conference tournament champion Conference tournament champion

== Two teams, same game ==
During the 1978–79 season, Skinner was traded by the New Jersey Nets to the Philadelphia 76ers along with Eric Money for Harvey Catchings and Ralph Simpson. The trade occurred while a protest filed by the Nets against the referees of an earlier game against the 76ers, which New Jersey had actually won, where head coach Kevin Loughery was called for three technical fouls. The rules only allowed two to be called, and the league granted the Nets' appeal. Therefore, the game was considered suspended at the point of the illegal technical foul call and the game would be restarted and finished from there when the two teams met again, by which time the trade had occurred. The players involved in the trade were allowed to suit up for their new teams when the suspended game resumed, and everyone but Skinner, who had not dressed for the original game either, got to play.

== Notes ==
- Skinner was inducted into the New England Basketball Hall of Fame in 2004.
- When Skinner coached Boston College, WEEI radio would broadcast the Al Skinner Show. The half hour program was hosted by Ted Sarandis and was taped before a live audience at the Metropolitan Club in Chestnut Hill and aired each Thursday.
- Coach Skinner was known for his impeccable dress habits among Boston College fans, which earned him the nickname "Coach Handsome". Those who watch closely notice that Skinner only wears a tie for home games, electing to wear either a polo or mock turtleneck on the road. It is rumored that Skinner does not wear the same suit twice in a given season.
- Skinner was a spokesperson for Eastern Clothing of Watertown, a prominent men's clothing store near Boston College.
