= 2000–01 Providence Friars men's basketball team =

American college basketball season

2000–01 Providence Friars men's basketball

NCAA tournament, First round
- Conference: Big East Conference
- Record: 21–10 (11–5 Big East)
- Head coach: Tim Welsh (3rd season)
- Home arena: Providence Civic Center

2000–01 Big East men's basketball standings
	Conf.				Overall
Team	W		L	PCT	W		L	PCT
East
No. 7 Boston College †	13	–	3	.813	27	–	5	.844
Providence	11	–	5	.688	21	–	10	.677
St. John's#	8	–	8	.500	5	–	15	.250
Miami	8	–	8	.500	16	–	13	.552
Villanova	8	–	8	.500	18	–	13	.581
Connecticut	8	–	8	.500	20	–	12	.625
Virginia Tech*	2	–	14	.125	8	–	19	.296
West
No. 19 Notre Dame	11	–	5	.688	20	–	10	.667
No. 21 Georgetown	10	–	6	.625	25	–	8	.758
No. 17 Syracuse	10	–	6	.625	25	–	9	.735
West Virginia	8	–	8	.500	17	–	12	.586
Pittsburgh	7	–	9	.438	19	–	14	.576
Seton Hall	5	–	11	.313	16	–	15	.516
Rutgers*	3	–	13	.188	11	–	16	.407
† 2001 Big East tournament winner As of April 2, 2001; Rankings from AP Poll #St. John's had 9 regular-season games vacated due to sanctions against the program; the school′s disputed record was 8–8, 14–15. *Did not qualify for 2001 Big East tournament.

The 2000–01 Providence Friars men's basketball team represented Providence College during the 2000–01 NCAA Division I men's basketball season. Led by head coach Tim Welsh, the Friars finished the season 21–10 (11–5 Big East) and received an at-large bid to the NCAA tournament as the 10 seed in the South region. The team was beaten by No. 7 seed Penn State, 69–59, in the opening round.

== Roster ==
2000–01 Providence Friars men's basketball team
Players
Coaches

Pos.	#	Name	Height	Weight	Year	Previous school	Hometown
C	3	Karim Shabazz	7 ft 2 in (2.18 m)	230 lb (104 kg)	Sr	Lawrence Woodmere Academy; Florida State	Far Rockaway, New York
F	4	Romuald Augustin	6 ft 7 in (2.01 m)	205 lb (93 kg)	So	Rayen	Montreal, Quebec
G	10	Chris Rogers	6 ft 4 in (1.93 m)	190 lb (86 kg)	Sr	Bossier Parish CC	Shreveport, Louisiana
G	11	Abdul Mills	6 ft 3 in (1.91 m)	190 lb (86 kg)	So	Milford Academy	Brooklyn, New York
G	12	John Linehan	5 ft 9 in (1.75 m)	165 lb (75 kg)	Jr	The Winchendon School	Chester, Pennsylvania
G	13	Sheiku Kabba	6 ft 2 in (1.88 m)	185 lb (84 kg)	Fr	Bronx Regional	Bronx, New York
G	15	Kareem Hayletts	6 ft 0 in (1.83 m)	160 lb (73 kg)	Jr	Bergenfield	Bergenfield, New Jersey
F	20	Christopher Anrin	6 ft 7 in (2.01 m)	220 lb (100 kg)	Fr	Alvik	Värmdö, Sweden
F/C	21	Marcus Douthit	6 ft 10 in (2.08 m)	235 lb (107 kg)	Fr	Notre Dame Prep	Syracuse, New York
F	22	Māris Ļaksa	6 ft 9 in (2.06 m)	230 lb (104 kg)	Fr	Latvian Junior National Team	Ventspils, Latvia
F	24	Erron Maxey	6 ft 6 in (1.98 m)	220 lb (100 kg)	Sr	Elsinore	Lake Elsinore, California
F	25	Stephen Traugott	6 ft 5 in (1.96 m)	195 lb (88 kg)	So	Iona Prep	New Rochelle, New York

Head coach

- Tim Welsh (SUNY Potsdam)

Assistant coach(es)

Legend

- (C) Team captain
- (S) Suspended
- (I) Ineligible
- (W) Walk-on
- Injured
- Current redshirt

Roster

== Schedule and results ==
Date time, TV	Rank^{#}	Opponent^{#}	Result	Record	Site city, state
Exhibition
Nov 4, 2000*; 7:30 p.m.		One World All-Stars	W 78–72		Providence Civic Center (6,029); Providence, Rhode Island
Nov 11, 2000*; 7:30 p.m.		USDBL	W 94–62		Providence Civic Center (6,661); Providence, Rhode Island
Regular season
Nov 18, 2000*; 7:30 p.m.		Holy Cross	W 63–57	1–0	Providence Civic Center (6,536); Providence, Rhode Island
Nov 21, 2000*; 7:30 p.m.		Maine	L 71–80	1–1	Providence Civic Center (6,432); Providence, Rhode Island
Nov 24, 2000*; 7:30 p.m.		at UMKC; Energia Systems Thanksgiving Tournament	W 60–53	2–1	Municipal Auditorium (5,134); Kansas City, Missouri
Nov 25, 2000*; 7:30 p.m.		vs. Creighton; Energia Systems Thanksgiving Tournament	L 51–63	2–2	Municipal Auditorium (5,206); Kansas City, Missouri
Nov 26, 2000*; 4:30 p.m.		vs. Auburn; Energia Systems Thanksgiving Tournament	L 69–80	2–3	Municipal Auditorium (5,226); Kansas City, Missouri
Nov 29, 2000*; 7:30 p.m.		FIU	W 74–55	3–3	Providence Civic Center (6,625); Providence, Rhode Island
Dec 2, 2000*; 7:30 p.m.		Rhode Island	W 95–72	4–3	Providence Civic Center (11,272); Providence, Rhode Island
Dec 7, 2000*; 7:00 p.m.		at UMass	W 85–70	5–3	Mullins Center (4,718); Amherst, Massachusetts
Dec 11, 2000*; 7:30 p.m.		at George Washington	W 93–80	6–3	Charles E. Smith Center (3,194); Washington, D.C.
Dec 23, 2000*; 7:30 p.m.		at Brown	W 110–59	7–3	Pizzitola Sports Center (6,821); Providence, Rhode Island
Dec 28, 2000*; 7:30 p.m.		Boston University	W 73–49	8–3	Providence Civic Center (6,881); Providence, Rhode Island
Dec 30, 2000*; 7:30 p.m.		South Carolina	W 60–55	9–3	Providence Civic Center (7,120); Providence, Rhode Island
Jan 3, 2001; 7:30 p.m.		at No. 11 Seton Hall	L 80–87	9–4 (0–1)	Continental Airlines Arena (9,387); East Rutherford, New Jersey
Jan 9, 2001; 7:30 p.m.		at Villanova	W 76–67	10–4 (1–1)	First Union Center (6,500); Philadelphia, Pennsylvania
Jan 13, 2001; 12:00 p.m., WTXX		No. 13 Connecticut	W 81–68	11–4 (2–1)	Providence Civic Center (12,409); Providence, Rhode Island
Jan 16, 2001; 7:30 p.m.		Miami (FL)	L 64–78	11–5 (2–2)	Providence Civic Center (9,075); Providence, Rhode Island
Jan 20, 2001; 2:00 p.m.		at Virginia Tech	W 75–60	12–5 (3–2)	Cassell Coliseum (5,261); Blacksburg, Virginia
Jan 23, 2001; 7:30 p.m.		Pittsburgh	W 77–61	13–5 (4–2)	Providence Civic Center (8,177); Providence, Rhode Island
Jan 28, 2001; 7:30 p.m.		at Miami (FL)	W 80–70	14–5 (5–2)	Miami Arena (2,154); Miami, Florida
Jan 31, 2001; 7:30 p.m.		Villanova	W 84–64	15–5 (6–2)	Providence Civic Center (11,056); Providence, Rhode Island
Feb 3, 2001; 8:00 p.m.		St. John's	W 75–63	16–5 (7–2)	Providence Civic Center (12,993); Providence, Rhode Island
Feb 6, 2001; 7:30 p.m., WTXX		at Connecticut	L 68–83	16–6 (7–3)	Hartford Civic Center (16,294); Hartford, Connecticut
Feb 10, 2001; 7:00 p.m.		at No. 15 Georgetown	W 103–79	17–6 (8–3)	MCI Center (11,891); Washington, D.C.
Feb 14, 2001; 7:30 p.m., WLNY-TV		at St. John's	W 64–53	18–6 (9–3)	Alumni Hall (6,008); Queens, New York
Feb 17, 2001; 7:00 p.m.		at No. 9 Boston College	L 73–81	18–7 (9–4)	Silvio O. Conte Forum (8,606); Chestnut Hill, Massachusetts
Feb 20, 2001; 7:30 p.m.	No. 25	Virginia Tech	W 96–56	19–7 (10–4)	Providence Civic Center (10,912); Providence, Rhode Island
Feb 22, 2001*; 7:30 p.m.	No. 25	Binghamton	W 119–58	20–7	Providence Civic Center (8,742); Providence, Rhode Island
Feb 24, 2001*; 2:00 p.m.	No. 25	No. 10 Boston College	L 58–59	20–8 (10–5)	Providence Civic Center (12,993); Providence, Rhode Island
Mar 3, 2001; 4:00 p.m.		at Rutgers	W 69–66	21–8 (11–5)	Louis Brown Athletic Center (6,690); Piscataway, New Jersey
Big East Tournament
Mar 8, 2001*; 9:00 p.m.	(E2)	vs. (W3) No. 17 Syracuse; Quarterfinals	L 54–55	21–9	Madison Square Garden (19,528); New York, New York
NCAA Tournament
Mar 16, 2001*; 7:50 p.m.	(10 S)	vs. (7 S) Penn State; First round	L 59–69	21–10	Louisiana Superdome; New Orleans, Louisiana
*Non-conference game. ^{#}Rankings from AP Poll. (#) Tournament seedings in parentheses. S=South. All times are in Eastern Time.
