= 2000–01 Connecticut Huskies men's basketball team =

American college basketball season

2000–01 Connecticut Huskies men's basketball

NIT, Second Round
- Conference: Big East Conference
- Record: 20–12 (8–8 Big East)
- Head coach: Jim Calhoun (15th season)
- Assistant coaches: Karl Hobbs; Dave Leitao; Tom Moore
- Home arena: Hartford Civic Center; Harry A. Gampel Pavilion

2000–01 Big East men's basketball standings
	Conf.				Overall
Team	W		L	PCT	W		L	PCT
East
No. 7 Boston College †	13	–	3	.813	27	–	5	.844
Providence	11	–	5	.688	21	–	10	.677
St. John's#	8	–	8	.500	5	–	15	.250
Miami	8	–	8	.500	16	–	13	.552
Villanova	8	–	8	.500	18	–	13	.581
Connecticut	8	–	8	.500	20	–	12	.625
Virginia Tech*	2	–	14	.125	8	–	19	.296
West
No. 19 Notre Dame	11	–	5	.688	20	–	10	.667
No. 21 Georgetown	10	–	6	.625	25	–	8	.758
No. 17 Syracuse	10	–	6	.625	25	–	9	.735
West Virginia	8	–	8	.500	17	–	12	.586
Pittsburgh	7	–	9	.438	19	–	14	.576
Seton Hall	5	–	11	.313	16	–	15	.516
Rutgers*	3	–	13	.188	11	–	16	.407
† 2001 Big East tournament winner As of April 2, 2001; Rankings from AP Poll #St. John's had 9 regular-season games vacated due to sanctions against the program; the school′s disputed record was 8–8, 14–15. *Did not qualify for 2001 Big East tournament.

The 2000–01 Connecticut Huskies men's basketball team represented the University of Connecticut in the 2000–01 collegiate men's basketball season. The Huskies completed the season with a 20–12 overall record. The Huskies were members of the Big East Conference where they finished with an 8–8 record. UConn made it to the Second Round in the 2001 National Invitation Tournament before losing to Detroit 67–61.

The Huskies played their home games at Harry A. Gampel Pavilion in Storrs, Connecticut and the Hartford Civic Center in Hartford, Connecticut, and they were led by fifteenth-year head coach Jim Calhoun.

== Roster ==
Listed are the student athletes who were members of the 2000–2001 team.

Name	Position	Year
Justin Brown	C	SO
Taliek Brown	G	FR
Caron Butler	F	FR
Marcus Cox	G	SO
Ajou Deng	F	JR
Kwasi Gyambibi	G	JR
Scott Hazelton	F	FR
Albert Mouring	G	SR
Tony Robertson	G	SO
Edmund Saunders	F	SR
Johnnie Selvie	F	JR
Robert Swain	G	FR
Shamon Tooles	G	FR
Souleymane Wane	C	SR
Ace Watanasuparp	G	FR
Mike Woodward	G	SO

== Schedule ==
Date time, TV	Rank^{#}	Opponent^{#}	Result	Record	Site (attendance) city, state
Exhibition
11/8/2000*	No. 13	Marathon Basketball	W 100–87		Harry A. Gampel Pavilion; Storrs, Connecticut
11/14/2000*	No. 13	NY All-Stars	W 111–59		Hartford Civic Center; Hartford, Connecticut
Regular Season
11/17/2000*; WTXX	No. 13	Quinnipiac	W 86–71	1–0	Hartford Civic Center (14,423); Hartford, Connecticut
11/20/2000*; WTXX	No. 13	vs. Dayton; Maui Invitational Tournament	L 66–80	1–1	Lahaina Civic Center (2,500); Lahaina, HI
11/21/2000*	No. 12	vs. Chaminade; Maui Invitational Tournament	W 77–61	2–1	Lahaina Civic Center (2,500); Lahaina, HI
11/22/2000*; WTXX	No. 12	vs. Louisville; Maui Invitational Tournament	W 83–71	3–1	Lahaina Civic Center (2,500); Lahaina, HI
11/28/2000*; WTXX	No. 16	Brown	W 88–78	4–1	Harry A. Gampel Pavilion (9,992); Storrs, Connecticut
11/30/2000*; WTXX	No. 16	Houston	W 72–60	5–1	Harry A. Gampel Pavilion (10,027); Storrs, Connecticut
12/2/2000*; WTXX	No. 16	New Hampshire	W 97–70	6–1	Harry A. Gampel Pavilion (10,027); Storrs, Connecticut
12/9/2000*; CBS	No. 15	No. 5 Arizona	W 71–69	7–1	Harry A. Gampel Pavilion (10,027); Storrs, Connecticut
12/12/2000*; ESPN	No. 11	Massachusetts; MassMutual UGame	W 82–67	8–1	Hartford Civic Center (9,123); Hartford, Connecticut
12/22/2000*; WTXX	No. 11	Fairfield	W 100–66	9–1	Hartford Civic Center (15,694); Hartford, Connecticut
12/26/2000*; WTXX	No. 10	Rhode Island	W 87–76	10–1	Hartford Civic Center (16,294); Hartford, Connecticut
12/28/2000*; WTXX	No. 10	Stony Brook	W 67–58	11–1	Hartford Civic Center (15,876); Hartford, Connecticut
1/3/2001; WTXX	No. 10	at Boston College	L 68–85	11–2 (0–1)	Conte Forum (8,606); Boston
1/6/2001; CBS	No. 10	St. John's	W 82–80	12–2 (1–1)	Harry A. Gampel Pavilion (10,027); Storrs, Connecticut
1/10/2001; WTXX	No. 13	Pittsburgh	W 73–53	13–2 (2–1)	Hartford Civic Center (16,294); Hartford, Connecticut
1/13/2001; WTXX	No. 13	at Providence	L 68–81	13–3 (2–2)	Providence Civic Center (12,409); Providence, Rhode Island
1/15/2001*; ESPN	No. 13	at No. 23 Texas	L 56–60	13–4	Frank Erwin Center (14,311); Austin, Texas
1/20/2001; WTXX	No. 15	at Miami	L 59–70	13–5 (2–3)	Miami Arena (7,138); Miami
1/24/2001; ESPN	No. 24	Villanova	L 59–70	13–6 (2–4)	Hartford Civic Center (16,294); Hartford, Connecticut
1/30/2001; ESPN2		at St. John's	L 55–60	13–7 (2–5)	Madison Square Garden (16,314); New York City
2/3/2001; WTXX		Virginia Tech	W 85–72	14–7 (3–5)	Harry A. Gampel Pavilion (10,027); Storrs, Connecticut
2/6/2001; WTXX		Providence	W 83–68	15–7 (4–5)	Hartford Civic Center (16,294); Hartford, Connecticut
2/10/2001; WTXX		at Villanova	L 60–74	15–8 (4–6)	First Union Center (15,242); Philadelphia
2/13/2001; WTXX		No. 9 Boston College	W 82–71	16–8 (5–6)	Hartford Civic Center (16,294); Hartford, Connecticut
2/17/2001; WTXX		at Virginia Tech	W 61–46	17–8 (6–6)	Cassell Coliseum (6,211); Blacksburg, Virginia
2/19/2001; ESPN		at No. 17 Syracuse; Rivalry	L 60–65	17–9 (6–7)	Carrier Dome (22,082); Syracuse, New York
2/24/2001; ABC		Miami	W 60–53	18–9 (7–7)	Harry A. Gampel Pavilion (10,027); Storrs, Connecticut
2/26/2001; ESPN		No. 13 Notre Dame	W 75–59	19–9 (8–7)	Hartford Civic Center (16,294); Hartford, Connecticut
3/3/2001; CBS		at Seton Hall	L 63–65	19–10 (8–8)	Continental Airlines Arena (18,055); East Rutherford, New Jersey
Big East tournament
3/7/2001; ESPN		vs. No. 14 Syracuse; First round/Rivalry	L 75–86	19–11	Madison Square Garden (19,528); New York
NIT
3/14/2001*; ESPN2		South Carolina; First Round	W 72–65	20–11	Harry A. Gampel Pavilion (3,244); Storrs, Connecticut
3/18/2001*		Detroit; Second Round	L 61–67	20–12	Harry A. Gampel Pavilion (8,689); Storrs, Connecticut
*Non-conference game. ^{#}Rankings from AP Poll. (#) Tournament seedings in parentheses. All times are in Eastern Time.

Schedule Source:
