= 2000–01 Boston College Eagles men's basketball team =

American college basketball season

2000–01 Boston College Eagles men's basketball

Big East tournament champion Big East Regular season champion

NCAA tournament, Round of 32
- Conference: Big East Conference

Ranking
- Coaches: No. 11
- AP: No. 7
- Record: 27–5 (13–3 Big East)
- Head coach: Al Skinner (4th season)
- Assistant coaches: Bill Coen (4th season); Ed Cooley (4th season); Pat Duquette (4th season)
- Home arena: Silvio O. Conte Forum

2000–01 Big East men's basketball standings
	Conf.				Overall
Team	W		L	PCT	W		L	PCT
East
No. 7 Boston College †	13	–	3	.813	27	–	5	.844
Providence	11	–	5	.688	21	–	10	.677
St. John's#	8	–	8	.500	5	–	15	.250
Miami	8	–	8	.500	16	–	13	.552
Villanova	8	–	8	.500	18	–	13	.581
Connecticut	8	–	8	.500	20	–	12	.625
Virginia Tech*	2	–	14	.125	8	–	19	.296
West
No. 19 Notre Dame	11	–	5	.688	20	–	10	.667
No. 21 Georgetown	10	–	6	.625	25	–	8	.758
No. 17 Syracuse	10	–	6	.625	25	–	9	.735
West Virginia	8	–	8	.500	17	–	12	.586
Pittsburgh	7	–	9	.438	19	–	14	.576
Seton Hall	5	–	11	.313	16	–	15	.516
Rutgers*	3	–	13	.188	11	–	16	.407
† 2001 Big East tournament winner As of April 2, 2001; Rankings from AP Poll #St. John's had 9 regular-season games vacated due to sanctions against the program; the school′s disputed record was 8–8, 14–15. *Did not qualify for 2001 Big East tournament.

The 2000–01 Boston College Eagles men's basketball team represented Boston College as a member of the Big East Conference during the 2000–01 NCAA Division I men's basketball season. Led by head coach Al Skinner, they played their home games at Conte Forum in Chestnut Hill, Massachusetts. The team finished atop the Big East regular season standings, won the Big East tournament, and received an automatic bid to the NCAA tournament. Playing as the No. 3 seed in the East region, the Eagles defeated Southern Utah in the opening round before being upset 74–71 by No. 6 seed USC in the second round. Boston College finished the season with a 27–5 (13–3 Big East) record and a No. 7 ranking in the AP poll.

== Roster ==
2000–01 Boston College Eagles men's basketball team
Players
Coaches

Pos.	#	Name	Height	Weight	Year	Hometown
G	2	Troy Bell	6 ft 1 in (1.85 m)	175 lb (79 kg)	So	Minneapolis, Minnesota
G		Xavier Singletary	6 ft 6 in (1.98 m)	216 lb (98 kg)	Sr	Washington, D.C.
G		Kenny Harley	6 ft 5 in (1.96 m)	196 lb (89 kg)	Sr	Bronx, New York
G		Ryan Sidney	6 ft 2 in (1.88 m)	205 lb (93 kg)	Fr	Ann Arbor, Michigan
F		Uka Agbai	6 ft 8 in (2.03 m)	262 lb (119 kg)	So	Queens Village, Queens
G		Kenny Walls	6 ft 5 in (1.96 m)	194 lb (88 kg)	Jr	San Francisco, California
F		Jonathan Beerbohm	6 ft 7 in (2.01 m)	229 lb (104 kg)	Sr	Fairbury, Nebraska
F		Brian Ross	7 ft 8 in (2.34 m)	240 lb (109 kg)	Jr	North Quincy, Massachusetts
G		Ludmil Hadjisotirov	6 ft 2 in (1.88 m)	202 lb (92 kg)	Fr	Sofia
G		Nicolas Dunn	6 ft 3 in (1.91 m)	201 lb (91 kg)	Sr	Braintree, Massachusetts
G		Adam DeMong	6 ft 2 in (1.88 m)	180 lb (82 kg)	So	Glen Ellyn, Illinois
G		Jon Ekweozor (W)	6 ft 1 in (1.85 m)	170 lb (77 kg)	Sr	Newton, Massachusetts
C		Andrew Dudley	6 ft 11 in (2.11 m)	255 lb (116 kg)	So	Bristol, Pennsylvania

Head coach

- Al Skinner

Assistant coach(es)

- Bill Coen
- Ed Cooley
- Pat Duquette

Legend

- (C) Team captain
- (S) Suspended
- (I) Ineligible
- (W) Walk-on
- Injured
- Current redshirt

== Schedule and results ==
Date time, TV	Rank^{#}	Opponent^{#}	Result	Record	Site city, state
Regular season
Nov 19, 2000*		Saint Peter's	W 100–75	1–0	Silvio O. Conte Forum; Chestnut Hill, Massachusetts
Nov 25, 2000*		Brown	W 81–52	2–0	Silvio O. Conte Forum; Chestnut Hill, Massachusetts
Nov 28, 2000*		Marist	W 74–65	3–0	Silvio O. Conte Forum; Chestnut Hill, Massachusetts
Dec 2, 2000*		Wofford	W 71–57	4–0	Silvio O. Conte Forum; Chestnut Hill, Massachusetts
Dec 4, 2000*		Holy Cross	W 77–48	5–0	Silvio O. Conte Forum; Chestnut Hill, Massachusetts
Dec 9, 2000*		Youngstown State	W 93–65	6–0	Silvio O. Conte Forum; Chestnut Hill, Massachusetts
Dec 17, 2000*		at UMass	W 74–65	7–0	Mullins Center; Amherst, Massachusetts
Dec 23, 2000*		Quinnipiac	W 88–55	8–0	Silvio O. Conte Forum; Chestnut Hill, Massachusetts
Dec 30, 2000*		Vanderbilt	W 97–74	9–0	Silvio O. Conte Forum; Chestnut Hill, Massachusetts
Jan 3, 2001		No. 10 Connecticut	W 85–68	10–0 (1–0)	Silvio O. Conte Forum; Chestnut Hill, Massachusetts
Jan 7, 2001		at Miami (FL)	W 73–72	11–0 (2–0)	Miami Arena; Miami, Florida
Jan 10, 2001	No. 24	at St. John's	L 71–73	11–1 (2–1)	Madison Square Garden; New York, New York
Jan 13, 2001	No. 24	Miami (FL)	W 82–73	12–1 (3–1)	Silvio O. Conte Forum; Chestnut Hill, Massachusetts
Jan 16, 2001*	No. 25	at No. 2 Duke	L 75–97	12–2	Cameron Indoor Stadium; Durham, North Carolina
Jan 20, 2001	No. 25	Rutgers	W 77–51	13–2 (4–1)	Silvio O. Conte Forum; Chestnut Hill, Massachusetts
Jan 27, 2001	No. 23	at Villanova	W 90–80	14–2 (5–1)	Wells Fargo Center; Philadelphia, Pennsylvania
Jan 31, 2001	No. 20	Virginia Tech	W 83–61	15–2 (6–1)	Silvio O. Conte Forum; Chestnut Hill, Massachusetts
Feb 4, 2001	No. 20	Villanova	W 89–74	16–2 (7–1)	Silvio O. Conte Forum; Chestnut Hill, Massachusetts
Feb 7, 2001	No. 17	No. 9 Syracuse	W 65–63	17–2 (8–1)	Silvio O. Conte Forum; Chestnut Hill, Massachusetts
Feb 10, 2001	No. 17	at Virginia Tech	W 83–59	18–2 (9–1)	Cassell Coliseum; Blacksburg, Virginia
Feb 13, 2001	No. 9	at UConn	L 71–82	18–3 (9–2)	Harry A. Gampel Pavilion; Storrs, Connecticut
Feb 17, 2001	No. 9	Providence	W 81–73	19–3 (10–2)	Silvio O. Conte Forum; Chestnut Hill, Massachusetts
Feb 21, 2001	No. 10	at No. 18 Notre Dame	L 75–76	19–4 (10–3)	Purcell Pavilion; Notre Dame, Indiana
Feb 24, 2001	No. 10	at No. 25 Providence	W 59–58	20–4 (11–3)	Dunkin' Donuts Center; Providence, Rhode Island
Feb 26, 2001	No. 11	Morris Brown	W 84–63	21–4 (11–3)	Silvio O. Conte Forum; Chestnut Hill, Massachusetts
Feb 28, 2001	No. 11	St. John's	W 67–62	22–4 (12–3)	Silvio O. Conte Forum; Chestnut Hill, Massachusetts
Mar 3, 2001	No. 11	at West Virginia	W 96–65	23–4 (13–3)	WVU Coliseum; Morgantown, West Virginia
Big East tournament
Mar 8, 2001*	(1 E) No. 10	vs. (5 E) Villanova; Quarterfinals	W 93–79	24–4	Madison Square Garden; New York, New York
Mar 9, 2001*	(1 E) No. 10	vs. (6 W) Seton Hall; Semifinals	W 75–48	25–4	Madison Square Garden; New York, New York
Mar 10, 2001*	(1 E) No. 10	vs. (5 W) Pittsburgh; Championship game	W 79–57	26–4	Madison Square Garden; New York, New York
NCAA Tournament
Mar 15, 2001*	(3 E) No. 7	vs. (14 E) Southern Utah; First Round	W 68–65	27–4	Nassau Coliseum; Uniondale, New York
Mar 17, 2001*	(3 E) No. 7	vs. (6 E) USC; Second Round	L 71–74	27–5	Nassau Coliseum; Uniondale, New York
*Non-conference game. ^{#}Rankings from AP poll. (#) Tournament seedings in parentheses. E=East.
