= 2001 Big East men's basketball tournament =

- Classification: Division I
- Season: 2000–01
- Teams: 12
- Site: Madison Square Garden; New York City
- Champions: Boston College (2nd title)
- Winning coach: Al Skinner (1st title)
- MVP: Troy Bell (Boston College)

2000–01 Big East men's basketball standings
| | Conf. | | | | Overall |
| Team | W | | L | PCT | W | | L | PCT |
|---|---|---|---|---|---|---|---|---|
East
| No. 7 Boston College † | 13 | – | 3 | .813 | 27 | – | 5 | .844 |
| Providence | 11 | – | 5 | .688 | 21 | – | 10 | .677 |
| St. John's# | 8 | – | 8 | .500 | 5 | – | 15 | .250 |
| Miami | 8 | – | 8 | .500 | 16 | – | 13 | .552 |
| Villanova | 8 | – | 8 | .500 | 18 | – | 13 | .581 |
| Connecticut | 8 | – | 8 | .500 | 20 | – | 12 | .625 |
| Virginia Tech* | 2 | – | 14 | .125 | 8 | – | 19 | .296 |
West
| No. 19 Notre Dame | 11 | – | 5 | .688 | 20 | – | 10 | .667 |
| No. 21 Georgetown | 10 | – | 6 | .625 | 25 | – | 8 | .758 |
| No. 17 Syracuse | 10 | – | 6 | .625 | 25 | – | 9 | .735 |
| West Virginia | 8 | – | 8 | .500 | 17 | – | 12 | .586 |
| Pittsburgh | 7 | – | 9 | .438 | 19 | – | 14 | .576 |
| Seton Hall | 5 | – | 11 | .313 | 16 | – | 15 | .516 |
| Rutgers* | 3 | – | 13 | .188 | 11 | – | 16 | .407 |
† 2001 Big East tournament winner As of April 2, 2001; Rankings from AP Poll #St. John's had 9 regular-season games vacated due to sanctions against the program; the school′s disputed record was 8–8, 14–15. *Did not qualify for 2001 Big East tournament.

The 2001 Big East men's basketball tournament took place at Madison Square Garden in New York City. Its winner received the Big East Conference's automatic bid to the 2001 NCAA tournament. It is a single-elimination tournament with four rounds and the two highest seeds in each division received byes in the first round. The six teams with the best conference records in each division were invited to participate for a total of 12 teams. Teams were seeded by division. Boston College had the best regular season conference record and received the East #1 seed, while Notre Dame received the West #1 seed.

Boston College defeated Pittsburgh in the championship game 79–57 for its second and final Big East tournament championship.

== Bracket ==
First round March 7, 2001
W5 | Pittsburgh | 78
E4 | Miami | 69
E6 | Connecticut | 75
W3 | #17 Syracuse | 86
E5 | Villanova | 82
W4 | West Virginia | 71
W6 | Seton Hall | 78
E3 | St. John's | 66

Quarterfinals; March 8, 2001
W1 | #19 Notre Dame | 54
W5 | Pittsburgh | 66
E2 | Providence | 54
W3 | #17 Syracuse | 55
E1 | #10 Boston College | 93
E5 | Villanova | 79
W2 | #18 Georgetown | 40
W6 | Seton Hall | 58

Semifinals; March 9, 2001
W5 | Pittsburgh* | 55
W3 | #17 Syracuse | 54
E1 | #10 Boston College | 75
W6 | Seton Hall | 48

Championship Game; March 10, 2001
W5 | Pittsburgh | 57
E1 | #10 Boston College | 79

* denotes an overtime (OT) period.

Note: By finishing in last place during the regular season in their respective divisions, Virginia Tech and Rutgers did not qualify for the tournament.

== Awards ==
Dave Gavitt Trophy (Most Outstanding Player): Troy Bell, Boston College

All-Tournament Team

- Jonathan Beerbohm, Boston College
- Ricardo Greer, Pittsburgh
- Eddie Griffin, Seton Hall
- Preston Shumpert, Syracuse
- Xavier Singletary, Boston College
