= 2000–01 Georgetown Hoyas men's basketball team =

American college basketball season

2000–01 Georgetown Hoyas men's basketball

Hawaii-Pacific Classic Champions

NCAA tournament, Sweet Sixteen
- Conference: Big East
- West Division

Ranking
- Coaches: No. 17
- AP: No. 21
- Record: 25–8 (10–6 Big East)
- Head coach: Craig Esherick (3rd season)
- Assistant coaches: Mike Riley (19th season); Ronny Thompson (3rd season); Chip Simms (2nd season)
- Captains: Ruben Boumtje-Boumtje; Kevin Braswell
- Home arena: MCI Center

2000–01 Big East men's basketball standings
	Conf.				Overall
Team	W		L	PCT	W		L	PCT
East
No. 7 Boston College †	13	–	3	.813	27	–	5	.844
Providence	11	–	5	.688	21	–	10	.677
St. John's#	8	–	8	.500	5	–	15	.250
Miami	8	–	8	.500	16	–	13	.552
Villanova	8	–	8	.500	18	–	13	.581
Connecticut	8	–	8	.500	20	–	12	.625
Virginia Tech*	2	–	14	.125	8	–	19	.296
West
No. 19 Notre Dame	11	–	5	.688	20	–	10	.667
No. 21 Georgetown	10	–	6	.625	25	–	8	.758
No. 17 Syracuse	10	–	6	.625	25	–	9	.735
West Virginia	8	–	8	.500	17	–	12	.586
Pittsburgh	7	–	9	.438	19	–	14	.576
Seton Hall	5	–	11	.313	16	–	15	.516
Rutgers*	3	–	13	.188	11	–	16	.407
† 2001 Big East tournament winner As of April 2, 2001; Rankings from AP Poll #St. John's had 9 regular-season games vacated due to sanctions against the program; the school′s disputed record was 8–8, 14–15. *Did not qualify for 2001 Big East tournament.

The 2000–01 Georgetown Hoyas men's basketball team represented Georgetown University in the 2000–01 NCAA Division I college basketball season. The Hoyas were coached by Craig Esherick and played most of their home games at the MCI Center in Washington, DC, although they played some home games early in the season at McDonough Gymnasium on the Georgetown campus. The Hoyas were members of the West Division of the Big East Conference. They finished the season 25–8, 10–6 in Big East play. Their record earned them a bye in the first round of the 2001 Big East men's basketball tournament, but they lost to Seton Hall in the quarterfinals. The first Georgetown men's basketball team to appear in the NCAA Division I men's basketball tournament since the 1996–97 season and the last one to do so until the 2005–06 season, they reached the West Region semifinals of the 2001 NCAA tournament before losing to Maryland.

== Season recap ==
Beginning this season, the Big East organized its teams into divisions for the second time (Note: The first time the Big East had organized itself into divisions was from the 1995-96 through 1997–98 seasons, when its teams had been assigned to a Big East 6 Division and a Big East 7 Division.) in its history; this time, the two divisions were the East and West divisions. Georgetown would play as a member of the West Division for three seasons before the conference again scrapped its divisional structure after the end of the 2002–03 season.

Freshman forward Mike Sweetney joined the team this season and quickly established himself as a dominating power forward. He started all 33 games during the season and got off to a strong start, scoring 19 points in each of his first three games. In Big East play, he had 14 points and 14 rebounds in a big upset win over 18th-ranked Seton Hall in early January 2001, had another double-double ten days later against Nevada-Las Vegas, scored 14 points and pulled down 13 rebounds against Syracuse, and scored a season-high 24 points against Pittsburgh. During the season, he led the Hoyas in scoring 11 times and in rebounding 13 times, and he finished the season averaging 12.8 points and 7.4 rebounds per game.

Sweetney's arrival meant that junior guard and team co-captain Kevin Braswell took fewer shots than he had in his first two seasons, but his shooting average from the field improved from 33.5 percent in his freshman year and 36.8 percent in his sophomore year to 37.8 percent this season and his play was more even, with fewer of the deep slumps he had suffered through previously. He started all 33 games; he started all 128 games of his collegiate career. In the early-January upset of Seton Hall, he scored a career-high 26 points, and he scored in double figures in nine games over a ten-game stretch late in the season.

Senior center and team co-captain Ruben Boumtje-Boumtje started all 33 games, but no longer was a primary scoring option as Georgetown's frontcourt offensive focus shifted to Sweetney and center-forward Lee Scruggs. Nonetheless, he scored in double figures 12 times, and over a four-game stretch late in the season scored a combined 55 points and pulled down a combined 37 rebounds as the Hoyas pushed for an invitation to the NCAA tournament.

Sophomore guard Demetrius Hunter replaced senior guard Anthony Perry in the starting lineup this season, but Perry remained active in a "sixth man" role and appeared in all 33 games. Although he averaged only 17 minutes and six field goal attempts per game, he scored 16 points twice, at Houston on New Year's Eve and again three days later at West Virginia, and had a 15-point game at Rutgers in which he stole the ball at the end of the game to preserve a Georgetown victory. He finished the season averaging 6.7 points per game for the year and 9.5 points per game for his career.

Senior guard Nat Burton had dropped into a reserve role the previous season, reducing his offensive statistics, and his offensive production dropped further this season. However, he played a key role in some important games. He scored 11 points in a win at Louisville, had eight rebounds at Houston, and scored 16 points against Virginia Tech. His playing time diminished as the year wore on, and he scored only a combined 30 points in the final 13 games of the regular season. Freshman forward Gerald Riley joined the team, and started all 33 games – as he would all 125 games of his collegiate career – and showed promise as the team's fifth scoring option, playing small forward and averaging 6.7 points per game. He would emerge as a star in later seasons.

The team opened the season 16–0, the best start by a Georgetown team since the 1984–85 season, with four of the wins against Big East opponents. After that, the Hoyas lost six of their next ten games, all in the conference, often thanks to poor starts. They fell to 20–6 overall and 7–6 in the Big East, and with only three games left in the regular season and 17th-ranked Syracuse coming to the MCI Center on February 24, 2001, the Hoyas' hopes of making the NCAA Division I men's basketball tournament were in doubt. Against Syracuse, Georgetown scored the first seven points of the game, but the Orangemen responded with a 9–3 run to close to 10–9. Despite suffering from an Achilles tendon injury, Demetrius Hunter scored a three-pointer to open Georgetown's lead to 13–9. After Syracuse took a 15–14 lead, Scruggs hit a three-pointer to give the Hoyas a 17–15 advantage, and the teams traded leads for the rest of the first half, with Georgetown leading 36–33 at halftime. The Hoyas shot poorly from the free-throw line during the first half, and, in the second half, while Syracuse was scoring on 90 percent of its free throws, the Hoyas shot only 3-for-9 (33%) from the free-throw line in one stretch and only 12-for-28 (42.9%) for the game. Syracuse was leading when Hunter scored back-to-back three-pointers to put the Hoyas ahead with 11:10 left in the game. With Syracuse in foul trouble inside, Georgetown's lead varied between six and eight points. Syracuse senior forward Damone Brown's field goal with 5:04 left cut Georgetown's lead to 63–57, but it was the Orangemen's last field goal of the game. Playing tough defense, grabbing three straight offensive rebounds, and using the clock well, the Hoyas built their lead to 12 points with 2:39 remaining. Hunter, who had a 21-point game, scored on a slam dunk with 38 seconds remaining, after which Braswell dribbled out the clock to seal a 72–61 Hoya win. After the game, Hoya fans flooded onto the court, the first time that had ever happened at a Big East home game for Georgetown.

Georgetown won its final two regular-season games to give it a record of 23–6 overall, 10–6 in the Big East, and a second-place finish in the conference's West Division. The Hoyas received a bye in the first round of the 2001 Big East tournament and in the quarterfinals met Seton Hall, a team they had beaten twice during the regular season. Braswell shot 0-for-6 from the field and failed to score – the only game in his collegiate career in which he did not score – and the underdog Pirates handed Georgetown a 58–40 loss.

Despite their early exit from the Big East tournament, the Hoyas had a 23–7 record overall and received an invitation to the 2001 NCAA tournament. Making their first appearance in the tournament since 1997, they were seeded No. 10 in the West Region and met the No. 7 seed, Arkansas, in the first round. Pregame press coverage billed the game as a struggle between Arkansas's press defense and Georgetown's height inside, but the Razorbacks' press was not especially effective and the Hoyas' frontcourt of Boumtje-Boumtje, Sweetney, and sophomore forward Wesley Wilson shot a combined 0-for-4 from the field in the first half amidst bad passing and bad shot selection. Guards Braswell and Perry – with Perry hitting two big three-point shots during the game – kept the Hoyas close as the teams traded leads, but Arkansas took a 31–30 advantage into the locker room at halftime. Toward the end of the intermission, arena personnel were forced to dismantle a malfunctioning horn and light above one of the baskets, delaying the start of the second half for ten minutes; after the second half finally began, Georgetown's inside game improved, but Arkansas also began to score inside consistently, and the Razorbacks led 47–43 with about 10 minutes left to play. They soon extended their lead to 52–45, but Georgetown then went on a 12–5 run to tie the game at 57–57 with just over five minutes remaining. Arkansas retook the lead and held it until Braswell took the ball all the way from one end of the court to the other and scored to give the Hoyas a 61–59 lead with 1:43 remaining. Arkansas sophomore Joe Johnson scored to tie the game at 61–61 with 35.8 seconds left to play. After a time-out, Georgetown sophomore forward Victor Samnick passed the ball to Burton, who held the ball, intending to get it to Braswell for a last-second game-winning shot. Unable to get the ball to Braswell, Burton instead drove to the basket himself and rolled in a shot at the buzzer. With the horn and light dismantled, it was not immediately obvious that Burton's shot had been in time, and Arkansas officials complained that the shot had been too late. A two-minute review by game officials ensued, and after they ruled that Burton's shot indeed had beaten the buzzer, Georgetown had a 63–61 upset victory. It was Georgetown's first NCAA Tournament win since 1996 and its first NCAA Tournament win at the buzzer since 1988. It was only the third time in 22 NCAA Tournament appearances that Georgetown had defeated a higher-seeded opponent.

In the second round, Georgetown faced the region's No. 15 seed, Hampton. Braswell scored 17 points despite shooting only 6-for-14 (42.9%) from the field, and the Hoyas defeated the Pirates, 76–57. Boumtje-Boumtje had a combined 15 points and 18 rebounds against Arkansas and Hampton.

In the West Region semifinals, Georgetown met the region's No. 3 seed, 11th-ranked Maryland. The Hoyas played well in the first half, leading by as many as five points on more than one occasion and forcing Maryland to commit nine turnovers. Georgetown only scored off two of those turnovers, however, and late in the half was stymied by a Maryland zone defense. After a frustrated Sweetney was called for an intentional foul, allowing the Terrapins to score four points and causing a six-point turnaround in the game, the Hoyas lost the lead. Demetrius Hunter missed a dunk and Maryland began to collect a number of offensive rebounds, off one of which they scored at the buzzer to take a 38–36 halftime lead. Early in the second half, Maryland extended its lead to nine points, with center Lonnie Baxter scoring six of them on his way to a 26-point, 14-rebound performance for the Terrapins. Boumtje-Boumtje played tentatively and fouled out after playing only 19 minutes, with three rebounds, one blocked shot, and no points scored. Although Braswell shot only 3-for-22 (13.6%) from the field, he and Scruggs led the Hoyas to a comeback that allowed them to close to 59–56 with under five minutes to play and a 67–62 deficit with 3:17 remaining. After that, however, Maryland extended its lead with good free-throw shooting. The Hoyas were forced to attempt three-pointers to try to catch up, but shot only 1-for-6 (16.7%) from three-point range late in the game and the Terrapins prevailed 76–66. Sweetney averaged 10 rebounds a game during the NCAA Tournament, while Boumtje-Boumtje completed his Georgetown career as the school's fourth all-time shot blocker, behind only Patrick Ewing, Alonzo Mourning, and Dikembe Mutombo.

The 2000-01 team's 25–8 finish was the best season for an Esherick-coached team and it was the only time during Esherick's 5 1/2-year tenure that Georgetown appeared in the NCAA Tournament. Although during the next four years Georgetown would appear in the National Invitation Tournament (NIT) twice and turn down an NIT invitation on a third occasion, the Hoyas would not return to the NCAA Tournament until 2006.

== Roster ==
#	Name	Height	Weight (lbs.)	Position	Class	Hometown	Previous Team(s)
1	Demetrius Hunter	6'2"	205	G	So.	Las Vegas, NV, U.S.	Cheyenne HS
2	Courtland Freeman	6'9"	228	F/C	So.	Myrtle Beach, SC, U.S.	Socastee HS
3	Omari Faulkner	6'6"	205	F	Fr.	Memphis, TN, U.S.	Hamilton HS
4	David Paulus	6'4"	195	G	So.	Syracuse, NY, U.S.	Christian Brothers Academy
5	Anthony Perry	6'3"	186	G	Jr.	Jersey City, NJ, U.S.	St. Anthony HS
10	RaMell Ross	6'6"	205	G/F	Fr.	Fairfax, VA, U.S.	Lake Braddock Secondary
11	Trenton Hillier	5'9"	165	G	So.	Chagrin Falls, OH, U.S.	Kenston HS
12	Kevin Braswell	6'2"	190	G	Jr.	Baltimore, MD, U.S.	Lake Clifton HS
13	Victor Samnick	6'8"	208	F	So.	Douala, Cameroon	Newport Prep (Md)
20	Gharun Hester	6'4"	205	F	Jr.	Fort Washington, MD, U.S.	Friendly HS
22	Glennard Johnson	6'4"	220	F	Fr.	Washington, DC, U.S.	St. Albans School; University of Virginia
25	Nat Burton	6'4"	218	G/F	Sr.	Washington, DC, U.S.	Winchendon Prep (Winchendon, MA)
32	Gerald Riley	6'6"	217	G	Fr.	Milledgeville, GA, U.S.	Baldwin HS
34	Mike Sweetney	6'8"	260	F/C	Fr.	Oxon Hill, MD, U.S.	Oxon Hill HS
44	Ruben Boumtje-Boumtje	7'0"	257	C	Sr.	Yaounde, Cameroon	Archbishop Carroll HS (Washington, DC)
45	Lee Scruggs	6'11"	216	C	So.	Franklinton, NC, U.S.	Franklinton HS; Daytona Beach Community College
50	Wesley Wilson	6'11"	235	C	So.	Vallejo, CA, U.S.	Maine Central Institute

== Rankings ==
Ranking movement Legend: ██ Improvement in ranking. ██ Decrease in ranking. ██ Not ranked the previous week. RV=Others receiving votes.
Poll	Pre	Wk 1	Wk 2	Wk 3	Wk 4	Wk 5	Wk 6	Wk 7	Wk 8	Wk 9	Wk 10	Wk 11	Wk 12	Wk 13	Wk 14	Wk 15	Wk 16	WK 17	Final	Post
AP						24	23	21	19	12	9	10	14	15	18	21	21	18	21	– (Note: No Associated Press Poll this week.)
Coaches	N/A	N/A	N/A	N/A	N/A	N/A	N/A	N/A	N/A	N/A	N/A	N/A	N/A	N/A	N/A	N/A	N/A	N/A	20	17

== 2000–01 Schedule and results ==
- All times are Eastern

Date time, TV	Rank^{#}	Opponent^{#}	Result	Record	Site (attendance) city, state
Preseason
Fri., Nov. 3, 2000; 7:00 p.m.		Fort Hood Tankers (All-Army Team)	W 71–66	exhibition	McDonough Gymnasium (N/A); Washington, DC
Fri., Nov. 10, 2000; 7:00 p.m.		Latvia Select	W 87–72	exhibition	McDonough Gymnasium (N/A); Washington, DC
Regular season
Fri., Nov. 17, 2000*; 8:00 p.m.		Bethune-Cookman	W 85–75	1–0	McDonough Gymnasium (1,863); Washington, DC
Fri., Nov. 24, 2000*; 5:00 p.m.		vs. Central Florida; Hawaii Pacific Classic Quarterfinal	W 77–65	2–0	Neal Blaisdell Center (1,119); Honolulu, HI
Sat., Nov. 25, 2000*; 7:00pm		vs. College of Charleston; Hawaii Pacific Classic Semifinal	W 79–68	3–0	Neal Blaisdell Center (795); Honolulu, HI
Sun., Nov. 26, 2000*; 10:30pm		vs. Minnesota; Hawaii Pacific Classic Final	W 76–60	4–0	Neal Blaisdell Center (750); Honolulu, HI
Sat., Dec. 2, 2000*; 2:00pm		Nicholls State	W 90–48	5–0	McDonough Gymnasium (2,176); Washington, DC
Tue., Dec. 5, 2000*; 7:30pm		at Louisville	W 70–63	6–0	Freedom Hall (18,586); Louisville, KY
Sat., Dec. 9, 2000*; 7:00pm		Grambling State	W 88–51	7–0	McDonough Gymnasium (1,931); Washington, DC
Tue., Dec. 12, 2000*; 7:00pm	No. 24	Coastal Carolina	W 78–60	8–0	McDonough Gymnasium (1,665); Washington, DC
Sat., Dec. 16, 2000*; 2:00pm	No. 24	Howard	W 123–90	9–0	MCI Center (7,135); Washington, DC
Fri., Dec. 22, 2000*; 7:00pm	No. 23	Maryland Eastern Shore	W 75–51	10–0	MCI Center (5,256); Washington, DC
Sun., Dec. 31, 2000*; 3:00pm	No. 21	at Houston	W 79–63	11–0	Hofheinz Pavilion (3,931); Houston, TX
Wed., Jan. 3, 2001; 7:00pm	No. 19	at West Virginia	W 90–66	12–0 (1–0)	WVU Coliseum (5,100); Morgantown, WV
Sat., Jan. 6, 2001; 12:00 noon	No. 19	No. 11 Seton Hall	W 78–66	13–0 (2–0)	MCI Center (11,187); Washington, DC
Wed., Jan. 10, 2001*; 7:00pm	No. 12	Morgan State	W 86–68	14–0	McDonough Gymnasium (1,873); Washington, DC
Sat., Jan. 13, 2001; 2:00pm	No. 12	Virginia Tech	W 96–68	15–0 (3–0)	MCI Center (12,011); Washington, DC
Mon., Jan. 15, 2001; 7:00pm	No. 12	at No. 15 Seton Hall	W 99–91	16–0 (4–0)	Continental Airlines Arena (11,878); East Rutherford, NJ
Sat., Jan. 20, 2001; 7:00pm	No. 9	Pittsburgh	L 66–70	16–1 (4–1)	MCI Center (12,109); Washington, DC
Thu., Jan. 25, 2001*; 7:30pm	No. 10	Nevada-Las Vegas	W 79–62	17–1	MCI Center (11,891); Washington, DC
Sat., Jan. 27, 2001; 12:00 noon	No. 10	Notre Dame	L 71–78	17−2 (4–2)	MCI Center (18,853); Washington, DC
Mon., Jan. 29, 2001; 7:05pm	No. 10	at No. 11 Syracuse; Rivalry	L 63–70	17–3 (4–3)	Carrier Dome (21,054); Syracuse, NY
Sat., Feb. 3, 2001; 12:00 noon	No. 14	West Virginia	W 94–77	18–3 (5–3)	MCI Center (11,891); Washington, DC
Mon., Feb. 5, 2001; 7:30pm	No. 14	at Pittsburgh	W 81–67	19–3 (6–3)	Fitzgerald Field House (6,511); Pittsburgh, PA
Sat., Feb. 10, 2001; 7:00pm	No. 15	Providence	L 79–103	19–4 (6–4)	MCI Center (12,993); Washington, DC
Mon., Feb. 12, 2001; 7:00pm	No. 15	Villanova	L 56–59	19–5 (6–5)	MCI Center (11,173); Washington, DC
Sat., Feb. 17, 2001; 2:00pm	No. 18	at Rutgers	W 76–73	20–5 (7–5)	Louis Brown Athletic Center (7,203); Piscataway, NJ
Wed., Feb. 21, 2001; 9:00pm	No. 21	at St. John's	L 70–73	20–6 (7–6)	Madison Square Garden (14,168); New York, NY
Sat., Feb. 24, 2001; 12:05 noon	No. 21	No. 17 Syracuse; Rivalry	W 72–61	21–6 (8–6)	MCI Center (18,189); Washington, DC
Wed., Feb. 28, 2001; 12:00 noon	No. 21	Rutgers	W 74–58	22–6 (9–6)	MCI Center (9,918); Washington, DC
Sun., Mar. 4, 2001; 2:00pm, CBS	No. 21	at No. 13 Notre Dame	W 79–72	23–6 (10–6)	Edmund P. Joyce Center (11,418); Notre Dame, IN
Big East tournament
Thu., Mar. 8, 2001; 2:30pm	No. 18	vs. Seton Hall; Quarterfinal	L 40–58	23–7	Madison Square Garden (19,295); New York, NY
NCAA tournament
Thu., Mar. 15, 2001; 7:40pm, CBS	No. 21	vs. Arkansas; First Round	W 63–61	24–7	BSU Pavilion (11,085); Boise, ID
Sat., Mar. 17, 2001; 5:20pm, CBS	No. 21	vs. Hampton; Second Round	W 76–57	25–7	BSU Pavilion (11,669); Boise, ID
Thu., Mar. 22, 2001; 7:55pm, CBS	No. 21	vs. No. 11 Maryland; Sweet Sixteen	L 66–76	25–8	Arrowhead Pond of Anaheim (18,008); Anaheim, CA
*Non-conference game. ^{#}Rankings from AP Poll. (#) Tournament seedings in parentheses.
