= 2000–01 St. John's Red Storm men's basketball team =

American college basketball season

2000–01 St. John's Red Storm men's basketball
- Conference: Big East Conference
- Record: 5–15 (9 wins vacated) (8–8 Big East)
- Head coach: Mike Jarvis (3rd year)
- Assistant coaches: Kevin Clark; Mike Jarvis II; Dermon Player
- Home arena: Alumni Hall; Madison Square Garden

2000–01 Big East men's basketball standings
	Conf.				Overall
Team	W		L	PCT	W		L	PCT
East
No. 7 Boston College †	13	–	3	.813	27	–	5	.844
Providence	11	–	5	.688	21	–	10	.677
St. John's#	8	–	8	.500	5	–	15	.250
Miami	8	–	8	.500	16	–	13	.552
Villanova	8	–	8	.500	18	–	13	.581
Connecticut	8	–	8	.500	20	–	12	.625
Virginia Tech*	2	–	14	.125	8	–	19	.296
West
No. 19 Notre Dame	11	–	5	.688	20	–	10	.667
No. 21 Georgetown	10	–	6	.625	25	–	8	.758
No. 17 Syracuse	10	–	6	.625	25	–	9	.735
West Virginia	8	–	8	.500	17	–	12	.586
Pittsburgh	7	–	9	.438	19	–	14	.576
Seton Hall	5	–	11	.313	16	–	15	.516
Rutgers*	3	–	13	.188	11	–	16	.407
† 2001 Big East tournament winner As of April 2, 2001; Rankings from AP Poll #St. John's had 9 regular-season games vacated due to sanctions against the program; the school′s disputed record was 8–8, 14–15. *Did not qualify for 2001 Big East tournament.

The 2000–01 St. John's Red Storm men's basketball team represented St. John's University during the 2000–01 NCAA Division I men's basketball season. The team was coached by Mike Jarvis in his third year. St. John's home games are played at Carnesecca Arena, then called Alumni Hall, and Madison Square Garden and the team is a member of the Big East Conference.

== Off season ==
Mike Jarvis had turned down an offer from Michael Jordan in the offseason to become the head coach of the Washington Wizards to return for his 3rd season and rebuild a team that lost Bootsy Thornton and Lavor Postell to graduation, Erick Barkley to the pros and recruit Darius Miles altogether for the 2000 NBA draft.

=== Departures ===
Name	Number	Pos.	Height	Year	Hometown	Notes
Chudney Gray	3	PG	6'3"	Senior	Bronx, New York	Graduated
Kareem Syed	10	G	6'5"	Senior	Queens, New York	Graduated
Erick Barkley	12	PG	6'1"	Sophomore	Queens, New York	Entered 2000 NBA draft
Bootsy Thornton	14	SG	6'1"	Senior	Baltimore, Maryland	Graduated
Heath Orvis	21	G	6'0"	Freshman	Longmont, Colorado	Transferred. Morningside
Lavor Postell	25	F	6'5"	Senior	Albany, Georgia	Graduated. Entered 2000 NBA draft

=== Class of 2000 signees ===
College recruiting information
Name	Hometown	School	Height	Weight	Commit date
Omar Cook; PG	Brooklyn, NY	Christ the King High School	6 ft 1 in (1.85 m)	190 lb (86 kg)	
Omar Cook; PG	Recruit ratings: No ratings found				
Willie Shaw; SF	Bronx, NY	John F. Kennedy High School	6 ft 6 in (1.98 m)	190 lb (86 kg)	
Willie Shaw; SF	Recruit ratings: No ratings found				
Kyle Cuffe; PF	Bronx, NY	Rice High School	6 ft 9 in (2.06 m)	236 lb (107 kg)	
Kyle Cuffe; PF	Recruit ratings: No ratings found				
Mohamed Diakite; C	Rockville, MD	Montrose Christian School	6 ft 11 in (2.11 m)	210 lb (95 kg)	
Mohamed Diakite; C	Recruit ratings: No ratings found				
Curtis Johnson; C	Norfolk, VA	Ryan Academy	7 ft 3 in (2.21 m)	320 lb (150 kg)	
Curtis Johnson; C	Recruit ratings: No ratings found				
Sharif Fordham; SG	Far Rockaway, NY	Gulf Coast Community College	6 ft 4 in (1.93 m)	N/A	
Sharif Fordham; SG	Recruit ratings: No ratings found				
Overall recruit ranking:
Note: In many cases, Scout, Rivals, 247Sports, On3, and ESPN may conflict in their listings of height and weight.; In these cases, the average was taken. ESPN grades are on a 100-point scale.; Sources: "2000 Team Ranking". Rivals.

== Roster ==
2000–01 St. John's Red Storm men's basketball team
Players
Coaches

Pos.	#	Name	Height	Weight	Year	Previous school	Hometown
G	3	Sharif Fordham	6 ft 4 in (1.93 m)	—	Jr	Milford Academy/Gulf Coast	Far Rockaway, NY
C	4	Abe Keita	6 ft 11 in (2.11 m)	—	So	Winchendon	Tolland, CT
G	10	Omar Cook	6 ft 1 in (1.85 m)	190 lb (86 kg)	Fr	Christ the King	Brooklyn, NY
G	11	John Scheiman (W)	6 ft 1 in (1.85 m)	—	So	LaGuardia	Manhattan, NY
G	15	Alpha Bangura	6 ft 6 in (1.98 m)	—	RS So	Eleanor Roosevelt/Monmouth	Lanham, MD
F	22	Anthony Glover	6 ft 6 in (1.98 m)	—	Jr	Rice	Bronx, NY
G/F	23	Willie Shaw	6 ft 6 in (1.98 m)	190 lb (86 kg)	Fr	Kennedy	Mount Vernon, NY
F	25	Kyle Cuffe	6 ft 9 in (2.06 m)	236 lb (107 kg)	Fr	Rice	Bronx, NY
F	32	Jack Wolfinger	6 ft 11 in (2.11 m)	—	RS Fr	Joel Barlow	Portland, OR
F/C	33	Donald Emanuel	6 ft 9 in (2.06 m)	—	Jr	Jones	Houston, TX
G/F	41	Reggie Jessie	6 ft 7 in (2.01 m)	—	Sr	Bishop Loughlin	Queensbridge, NY
C	44	Mohamed Diakite	6 ft 11 in (2.11 m)	210 lb (95 kg)	Fr	Montrose Christian	Rockville, MD
C	52	Curtis Johnson	7 ft 3 in (2.21 m)	320 lb (145 kg)	Fr	Ryan Academy	Norfolk, VA
F	55	John Parker (W)	6 ft 6 in (1.98 m)	—	So	John Muir	Pasadena, CA

Head coach

- Mike Jarvis (Northeastern)

Assistant coach(es)

- Kevin Clark
- Mike Jarvis II
- Dermon Player

Legend

- (C) Team captain
- (S) Suspended
- (I) Ineligible
- (W) Walk-on
- Injured
- Current redshirt

== Schedule and results ==
Date time, TV	Rank^{#}	Opponent^{#}	Result	Record	Site (attendance) city, state
Exhibition
11/03/00*; N/A		California All-Stars	W 86-80		Alumni Hall (5,438); Queens, NY
Regular season
11/09/00*; 6:30pm, ESPN2	No. 28	vs. No. 12 Kentucky; Coaches vs. Cancer Classic Semifinal	W 62-61	1-0	Madison Square Garden (N/A); New York, NY
11/10/00*; 9:00pm, ESPN	No. 28	vs. No. 7 Kansas; Coaches vs. Cancer Classic Championship	L 74-82	1-1	Madison Square Garden (19,528); New York, NY
11/15/00*; 7:30pm	No. 24	Maccabi Givat Shmuel Exb.	W 91-85		Alumni Hall (5,557); Queens, NY
11/18/00*; 7:30pm, WLNY-TV	No. 24	Stony Brook	W 92-62	2-1	Alumni Hall (6,008); Queens, NY
11/25/00*; 2:00pm	No. 24	Niagara	W 92-59	3-1	Alumni Hall (6,008); Queens, NY
12/02/00*; 3:00pm	No. 19	vs. George Washington; BB&T Classic Semifinal	L 75-85	3-2	MCI Center (N/A); Washington, D.C.
12/03/00*; 3:00pm, FSNY	No. 19	vs. Michigan; BB&T Classic Consolation	W 97-83	4-2	MCI Center (N/A); Washington, D.C.
12/09/00*; 2:00pm, MSG	No. 24	Fordham	L 67-68	4-3	Madison Square Garden (N/A); New York, NY
12/13/00*; 7:00pm, ESPN2		at Ohio State	L 58-71	4-4	Schottenstein Center (17,700); Columbus, OH
12/16/00*; 2:00pm		Hofstra	L 80-86	4-5	Nassau Coliseum (8,771); Hempstead, NY
12/21/00*; 7:30pm		Manhattan	W 72-63	5-5	Alumni Hall (6,008); Queens, NY
12/31/00*; 12:00pm, MSG		San Francisco	W 92-77	6-5	Alumni Hall (N/A); Queens, NY
01/03/01; 7:30pm		Virginia Tech	W 89-64	7-5 (1-0)	Alumni Hall (6,008); Queens, NY
01/06/01; 1:00pm, CBS		at No. 10 Connecticut	L 80-82 ^{OT}	7-6 (1-1)	Gampel Pavilion (N/A); Storrs, CT
01/10/01; 7:30pm		No. 24 Boston College	W 73-71	8-6 (2-1)	Madison Square Garden (13,392); New York, NY
01/14/01; 2:00pm, WWOR-TV		at Rutgers	W 80-71	9-6 (3-1)	Louis Brown Athletic Center (N/A); Piscataway, NJ
01/20/01; 12:00pm		Villanova	W 82-70	10-6 (4-1)	Madison Square Garden (N/A); New York, NY
01/22/01; 7:00pm, ESPN		Miami (F.L.)	W 67-63 ^{OT}	11-6 (5-1)	Madison Square Garden (N/A); New York, NY
01/27/01; N/A		at Virginia Tech	L 59-65	11-7 (5-2)	Cassell Coliseum (N/A); Blacksburg, VA
01/30/01; 7:00pm, ESPN2		Connecticut	W 60-55	12-7 (6-2)	Madison Square Garden (16,314); New York, NY
02/03/01; 8:00pm		at Providence	L 63-75	12-8 (6-3)	Providence Civic Center (12,993); Providence, RI
02/05/01; 7:00pm, ESPN		at Notre Dame	L 73-83	12-9 (6-4)	Joyce Convocation Center (N/A); Notre Dame, IN
02/10/01; 3:30pm, ABC		at Miami (F.L.)	W 85-79 ^{2OT}	13-9 (7-4)	Miami Arena (N/A); Miami, FL
02/14/01; 7:30pm, WLNY-TV		Providence	L 53-64	13-10 (7-5)	Alumni Hall (6,008); Queens, NY
02/18/01*; 12:00pm, CBS		No. 2 Duke	L 59-91	13-11 (7-5)	Madison Square Garden (N/A); New York, NY
02/21/01; 9:00pm, ESPN		Georgetown	W 73-70	14-11 (8-5)	Madison Square Garden (N/A); New York, NY
02/25/01; 3:30pm, ABC		at Villanova	L 55-71	14-12 (8-6)	The Pavilion (N/A); Villanova, PA
02/28/01; 7:30pm		at Boston College	L 62-67	14-13 (8-7)	Silvio O. Conte Forum (8,606); Chestnut Hill, MA
03/04/01; 12:00pm, CBS		No. 12 Syracuse	L 91-93 ^{2OT}	14-14 (8-8)	Madison Square Garden (N/A); New York, NY
Big East tournament
03/07/01; 2:00pm		Seton Hall; Big East tournament first round	L 66-78	14-15 (8-8)	Madison Square Garden (18,605); New York, NY
*Non-conference game. ^{#}Rankings from AP Poll. (#) Tournament seedings in parentheses.

== Team players drafted into the NBA ==
Round	Pick	Player	NBA club
2	31	Omar Cook	Orlando Magic
