= 2001 Big Ten men's basketball tournament =

- Classification: Division I
- Season: 2000–01
- Teams: 11
- Site: United Center; Chicago, Illinois
- Champions: Iowa Hawkeyes (1st title)
- Winning coach: Steve Alford (1st title)
- MVP: Reggie Evans (Iowa)

2000–01 Big Ten Conference men's basketball standings
	Conf.				Overall
Team	W		L	PCT	W		L	PCT
No. 4 Illinois	13	–	3	.813	27	–	8	.771
No. 3 Michigan State	13	–	3	.813	28	–	5	.848
No. 20 Indiana	10	–	6	.625	21	–	13	.618
No. 25 Wisconsin	9	–	7	.563	18	–	11	.621
No. 24 Iowa †	7	–	9	.438	23	–	12	.657
Penn State	7	–	9	.438	21	–	12	.636
Purdue	6	–	10	.375	17	–	15	.531
Minnesota	5	–	11	.313	18	–	14	.563
Michigan	4	–	12	.250	10	–	18	.357
Northwestern	3	–	13	.188	11	–	19	.367
Ohio State*	0	–	0	–	0	–	0	–
† 2001 Big Ten tournament winner Rankings from AP poll *Ohio State: 30 reg. season games; 1 NCAA Tourn. game vacated due to sanctions against the program Disputed record: Ohio State-(20-11)(11-5)

The 2001 Big Ten men's basketball tournament was the postseason men's basketball tournament for the Big Ten Conference and was played from March 8 to March 11, 2001 at the United Center in Chicago, Illinois. The championship was won by Iowa who defeated Indiana in the championship game. As a result, Iowa received the Big Ten's automatic bid to the NCAA tournament.

Due to NCAA sanctions, Ohio State has vacated the records from this tournament.

== Seeds ==
All Big Ten schools participated in the tournament. Teams were seeded by conference record, with a tiebreaker system used to seed teams with identical conference records. Seeding for the tournament was determined at the close of the regular conference season. The top five teams received a first round bye.

Seed	School	Conference	1st Tiebreaker	2nd Tiebreaker	3rd Tiebreaker
1	Illinois	13–3	1–0 vs MSU		
2	Michigan State	13–3	0–1 vs Ill		
3	Ohio State	11–5			
4	Indiana	10–6			
5	Wisconsin	9–7			
6	Iowa	7–9	1–1 vs PSU	1–1 vs Ill	0–1 vs MSU
7	Penn State	7–9	1–1 vs Iowa	1–1 vs Ill	0–2 vs MSU
8	Purdue	6–10			
9	Minnesota	5–11			
10	Michigan	4–12			
11	Northwestern	3–13			

== Bracket ==
Opening round March 8
8	Purdue	91
9	Minnesota	77
7	Penn State	82
10	Michigan	80
6	Iowa	72
11	Northwestern	55

Quarterfinals; March 9
1	#4 Illinois	83
8	Purdue	66
4	Indiana	64
5	#23 Wisconsin	52
2	#2 Michigan State	63
7	Penn State	65
3	#24 Ohio State	66
6	Iowa	75

Semifinals; March 10
1	#4 Illinois	56
4	Indiana	58
7	Penn State	74
6	Iowa	94

Championship; March 11
4	Indiana	61
6	Iowa	63

== Game summaries ==
=== Opening round ===
ESPN2

March 8
2:00 pm

No. 9 Minnesota 77, No. 8 Purdue 91
Scoring by half: 40-45, 37-46

United Center
Chicago, IL
Attendance: 20,003
Referees: Ed Hightower, Art McDonald, Jerry Petro

ESPN

March 8
4:30 pm

No. 10 Michigan 80, No. 7 Penn State 82
Scoring by half: 42-37, 38-45

United Center
Chicago, IL
Attendance: 20,003
Referees: Rick Hartzell, Gene Monje, Dan Chrisman

ESPN Plus

March 8
7:00 pm

No. 11 Northwestern 55, No. 6 Iowa 72
Scoring by half: 15-30, 40-42

United Center
Chicago, IL
Attendance: 20,003
Referees: Phil Bova, Sid Rodeheffer, Tom Clark

=== Quarterfinals ===
ESPN2

March 9
12:30 pm

No. 5 Wisconsin 52, No. 4 Indiana 64
Scoring by half: 28-24, 24-40

United Center
Chicago, IL
Attendance: 22,679
Referees: Ed Hightower, Art McDonald, Zelton Steed

ESPN2

March 9
3:00 pm

No. 8 Purdue 66, No. 1 Illinois 83
Scoring by half: 33-47, 33-36

United Center
Chicago, IL
Attendance: 22,679
Referees: Ted Hillary, Gene Monje, Sid Rodeheffer

ESPN Plus

March 9
7:40 pm

No. 7 Penn State 65, No. 2 Michigan State 63
Scoring by half: 31-30, 34-33

United Center
Chicago, IL
Attendance: 21,739
Referees: Donnee Gray, Phil Bova, Jerry Petro

ESPN2

March 9
10:00 pm

No. 6 Iowa 75, No. 3 Ohio State 66
Scoring by half: 22-33, 53-33

United Center
Chicago, IL
Attendance: 21,739
Referees: Tom Rucker, Mike Sanzere, Tom Clark

=== Semifinals ===
CBS

March 10
2:30 pm

No. 4 Indiana 58, No. 1 Illinois 56
Scoring by half: 26-29, 32-27

United Center
Chicago, IL
Attendance: 23,418
Referees: Phil Bova, Ted Hillary, Gene Monje

CBS

March 10
5:00 pm

No. 7 Penn State 74, No. 6 Iowa 94
Scoring by half: 33-49, 41-45

United Center
Chicago, IL
Attendance: 23,418
Referees: Ed Hightower, Tom Rucker, Mike Sanzere

=== Championship ===
CBS

March 11
3:30 pm

No. 6 Iowa 63, No. 4 Indiana 61
Scoring by half: 26-32, 37-29

United Center
Chicago, IL
Attendance: 22,081
Referees: Ed Hightower, Ted Hillary, Tom Rucker

== All-Tournament team ==
- Reggie Evans, Iowa – Big Ten tournament Most Outstanding Player
- Brian Cook, Illinois
- Kirk Haston, Indiana
- Jared Jeffries, Indiana
- Joe Crispin, Penn State
