= 2000–01 Michigan Wolverines men's basketball team =

American college basketball season

2000–01 Michigan Wolverines men's basketball
- Conference: Big Ten Conference
- Record: 10–18 (4–12 Big Ten)
- Head coach: Brian Ellerbe (4th season)
- Assistant coaches: Scott Trost; Kurtis Townsend; Terrence Greene
- MVPs: LaVell Blanchard; Bernard Robinson, Jr.
- Captains: Josh Asselin; Mike Gotfredson

2000–01 Big Ten Conference men's basketball standings
	Conf.				Overall
Team	W		L	PCT	W		L	PCT
No. 4 Illinois	13	–	3	.813	27	–	8	.771
No. 3 Michigan State	13	–	3	.813	28	–	5	.848
No. 20 Indiana	10	–	6	.625	21	–	13	.618
No. 25 Wisconsin	9	–	7	.563	18	–	11	.621
No. 24 Iowa †	7	–	9	.438	23	–	12	.657
Penn State	7	–	9	.438	21	–	12	.636
Purdue	6	–	10	.375	17	–	15	.531
Minnesota	5	–	11	.313	18	–	14	.563
Michigan	4	–	12	.250	10	–	18	.357
Northwestern	3	–	13	.188	11	–	19	.367
Ohio State*	0	–	0	–	0	–	0	–
† 2001 Big Ten tournament winner Rankings from AP poll *Ohio State: 30 reg. season games; 1 NCAA Tourn. game vacated due to sanctions against the program Disputed record: Ohio State-(20-11)(11-5)

The 2000–01 Michigan Wolverines men's basketball team represented the University of Michigan in intercollegiate college basketball during the 2000–01 season. The team played its home games in the Crisler Arena in Ann Arbor, Michigan, and was a member of the Big Ten Conference. Under the direction of head coach Brian Ellerbe, the team finished tied for eighth in the Big Ten Conference. The team earned a ten seed but was defeated in the first round of the 2000 Big Ten Conference men's basketball tournament. The team failed to earn an invitation to either the 2001 National Invitation Tournament or the 2001 NCAA Men's Division I Basketball Tournament. The team was unranked for all eighteen weeks of Associated Press Top Twenty-Five Poll, and it also ended the season unranked in the final USA Today/CNN Poll. The team had a 2–8 record against ranked opponents, with both of its victories coming against conference foe Iowa who was ranked #14 at the time of the first meeting on January 20 at Carver-Hawkeye Arena, which resulted in a 70–69 victory, and #25 at the time of the February 14 meeting at Crisler Arena that Michigan won 95–85.

Josh Asselin and Mike Gotfredson served as team co-captains, and LaVell Blanchard and Bernard Robinson, Jr. shared team MVP honors. The team's leading scorers were LaVell Blanchard (499 points), Bernard Robinson, Jr. (404 points) and Josh Asselin (269 points). The leading rebounders were Blanchard (235), Asselin (167) and Chris Young (138).

Chris Young won the Big Ten Conference statistical championship for field goal percentage with a 64.0% mark in all of Michigan's games.

In the 2001 Big Ten Conference men's basketball tournament at the United Center from March 8–11, Michigan was seeded tenth. In the first round they lost to number 7 Penn State 82–80.

== Team players drafted into the NBA ==
Year	Round	Pick	Overall	Player	NBA club
2004	2	15	45	Bernard Robinson	Charlotte Bobcats
