= Steve Alford =

American basketball player and coach (born 1964)

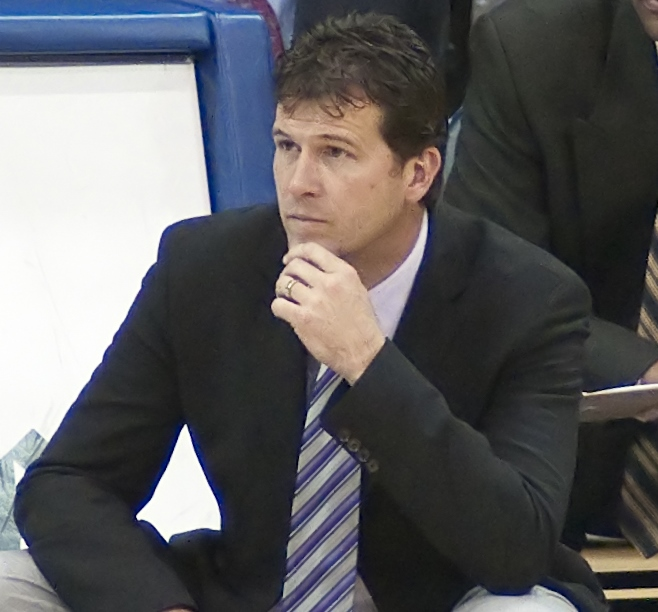
- Alford coaching the New Mexico Lobos in 2009

Nevada Wolf Pack
- Title: Head coach
- League: Mountain West Conference

Personal information
- Born: November 23, 1964 (age 61) Franklin, Indiana, U.S.
- Listed height: 6 ft 2 in (1.88 m)
- Listed weight: 183 lb (83 kg)

Career information
- High school: Chrysler (New Castle, Indiana)
- College: Indiana (1983–1987)
- NBA draft: 1987: 2nd round, 26th overall pick
- Drafted by: Dallas Mavericks
- Playing career: 1987–1991
- Position: Point guard
- Number: 2, 4
- Coaching career: 1991–present

Career history

Playing
- 1987–1988: Dallas Mavericks
- 1988–1989: Golden State Warriors
- 1989–1991: Dallas Mavericks

Coaching
- 1991–1995: Manchester
- 1995–1999: Southwest Missouri State
- 1999–2007: Iowa
- 2007–2013: New Mexico
- 2013–2018: UCLA
- 2019–present: Nevada

Career highlights
- As player: NCAA champion (1987); 2× Consensus first-team All-American (1986, 1987); 3× First-team All-Big Ten (1985–1987); Big Ten MVP (1987); Indiana Mr. Basketball (1983); As coach: Pac-12 tournament champion (2014); 2× MWC tournament champion (2012, 2013); 4× MWC regular season champion (2009, 2010, 2012, 2013); 2× Big Ten tournament champion (2001, 2006); 2× Heartland Conference regular season champion (1994, 1995); 3× MWC Coach of the Year (2009, 2010, 2013)
- Stats at NBA.com
- Stats at Basketball Reference
Medals
Men's basketball
Representing the United States
Gold medal – first place	1984 Los Angeles	Basketball

Stephen Todd Alford (born November 23, 1964) is an American men's college basketball coach and former professional player who is the head coach for the Nevada Wolf Pack of the Mountain West Conference (MWC). Born and raised in Indiana, he was a two-time consensus first-team All-American playing in college for the Indiana Hoosiers. He led them to a national championship in 1987. After playing professionally for four years in the National Basketball Association (NBA), he has been a college head coach for over 30 years.

Alford was named Indiana Mr. Basketball in high school before playing at Indiana University Bloomington under coach Bobby Knight. He helped the Hoosiers claim their fifth national championship, and finished his career as Indiana's all-time leading scorer. Alford was selected in the second round of the 1987 NBA draft by the Dallas Mavericks, and played four years in the league with Dallas and the Golden State Warriors. Alford then became a college head coach. He has coached at Manchester University, Southwest Missouri State University, the University of Iowa and the University of New Mexico. He spent 5 1/2 seasons with the UCLA Bruins before being fired midseason in 2018–19. By leading Nevada to the NCAA Tournament in 2023, he became the fourth head coach to lead five teams to the NCAA Division I Tournament.

== Early life ==
Alford was born in Franklin, Indiana and grew up in New Castle.

== College and Olympic career ==
Alford decided to play basketball for Bob Knight and the Indiana Hoosiers. At Indiana University Bloomington, he became the university's all-time leading scorer with 2,438 points (a record later eclipsed by Calbert Cheaney, who went on to become the Big Ten's all-time leading scorer). Alford was the first player to be named the team's MVP four times. During his final three seasons, Alford earned first team all-Big Ten honors. In the Legends of College Basketball by The Sporting News Alford was No. 35 on the list of the 100 greatest Division-I college basketball players. When The Sporting News named its top ten NCAA basketball players of the 1980s in December 1989, Alford was listed at number ten.

As a freshman, Alford helped lead Indiana to an upset of the Michael Jordan-led North Carolina Tar Heels in the 1984 NCAA tournament.

For the 1984 Summer Olympics Alford, just 19 years old that summer after his freshman year, was selected to play on the US basketball team, coached by Bob Knight. Alford averaged 10.3 points per game, was second in assists, and shot .644 from the field. He and his teammates won the gold medal. Alford has recounted that during the Olympic training camp, teammate Michael Jordan bet him $100 that he would not last four years on Knight's Indiana team.

As a sophomore, Alford was named to the 1985 NIT All-Tournament team after the Hoosiers finished second behind UCLA. As a junior, he and the 1985–86 Hoosiers were followed in the book A Season on the Brink. In his senior year, the 1986–87 Hoosiers won Indiana's fifth national championship. They defeated Syracuse in the tournament.

After graduation, Alford wrote Playing for Knight: My Six Seasons with Coach Knight, a book chronicling his playing experiences during college.

== Professional playing career ==
Alford was drafted 26th in the 1987 NBA draft. Although many fans expected Alford to be drafted by the Indiana Pacers, the Pacers selected Reggie Miller instead, and Alford was picked by the Dallas Mavericks. This choice angered Indiana fans at first, but they ultimately embraced the decision. Alford played in the NBA for four seasons, mostly with the Dallas Mavericks, although he spent a portion of one season with Golden State Warriors. Over his career, he started three games, scored 744 points, had 176 assists and shot free throws with an accuracy of 87 percent.

== Player profile ==
At the end of his career in college, Coach Knight said, "He's gotten more out of his abilities offensively than anybody I've seen play college basketball. He's about as good a scorer for being strictly a jump shooter as I've ever seen. He's scored more than 2,400 points that way, and that's incredible, considering he doesn't get any tip-ins, drives or dunks." Alford had a free throw percentage of .897 (535–596).

== Coaching career ==
=== Manchester University Spartans ===
Alford began his college coaching career in North Manchester, Indiana in 1991 as head coach of the Division III Manchester University's basketball program. During his four seasons with the team, Alford had a record of 78–29. When Alford began coaching that team, the team had lost its first eight games. During his first season there Alford won four of 20 games. In his first full season as coach the team posted a record of 20–8. In the next season Manchester posted a record of 23–4, and in his fourth and final season his team finished 31–1.

In 1994 and 1995 Manchester won conference titles, and in Alford's final three seasons the team competed in the NCAA Division III Tournament. Under Alford, the team won three straight conference tournament titles (1993, 1994, 1995). The team advanced to the Division III championship game in 1995, placing second in the nation after suffering its first defeat in 32 games. The loss to Bo Ryan's University of Wisconsin-Platteville team marked the only title game in NCAA history matching two undefeated squads.

In 1993, 1994, and 1995 Alford was named the Indiana Collegiate Conference Coach of the Year. In the 1994–95 season the Manchester team was inducted into the school Hall of Fame. In 1999 Alford was also inducted into Manchester's Hall of Fame.

=== Missouri State Bears ===
Following his time at Manchester, Alford was named the head coach at Southwest Missouri State University, now Missouri State University. He began his position there in the 1995–96 season, and would remain there until 1999. During his time at Missouri State, his teams posted a 78–48 record. In 1999, the Bears advanced to the Sweet 16 of the NCAA tournament before losing to Duke. As of 2024, Missouri State has not made an appearance in the NCAA Tournament since Alford's departure.

=== Iowa Hawkeyes ===
Alford was named the head coach of the University of Iowa Hawkeyes men's basketball program on March 22, 1999. Although his first game as coach was a 70–68 victory against the defending national champion Connecticut Huskies at Madison Square Garden, his team went 14–16 during his first season at Iowa. During his second year (2000–01) the Hawkeyes went 23–12 in the regular season and 7–9 in the Big Ten Conference regular season, but they won the Big Ten Conference men's basketball tournament with four straight wins against Northwestern, Ohio State, Penn State, and Indiana. This earned them a #7 seed in the 2001 NCAA Division I men's basketball tournament, where they defeated Creighton in the first round but lost to Kentucky in the second round.

The Hawkeyes' conference record dropped to 5–11 during the 2001–02 season, but they defeated Purdue, Wisconsin, and Indiana in the Big Ten tournament before losing to Ohio State in the finals. The Hawkeyes played in the National Invitation Tournament that season, but lost to LSU in the first round to finish with a 19–16 record. This was the first of three straight seasons that the Hawkeyes played in the NIT under Alford. They won the first two rounds of the 2003 tournament against Valparaiso and Iowa State before losing to Georgia Tech, finishing with a 17–14 record. That season, leading scorer Pierre Pierce was charged with raping a female Iowa athlete. Alford was adamant about Pierce's innocence. A plea bargain was reached where Pierce pleaded guilty to a lesser charge. He was suspended from the team and redshirted. In 2004, Iowa lost to St. Louis in the first round of the NIT to finish 16–13 despite a 9–7 conference record (the first winning Big Ten Conference record under Alford).

The Hawkeyes finished 21–12 with a 7–9 conference record in the 2004–2005 regular season, but they won their first two Big Ten tournament games against Purdue and Michigan State before losing the third game to Wisconsin, 59–56. They earned an at-large invitation to the 2005 NCAA tournament as a #10 seed, where they lost 76–64 to Cincinnati in the first round. In 2005, in a separate incident, Pierce was charged with sexual assault of his ex-girlfriend, and he was dismissed from the team before charges were filed. However, Alford's reputation among Iowa fans suffered. Pierce later served 11 months in a correctional facility.

During the 2005–06 season, the Hawkeyes went undefeated at Carver-Hawkeye Arena and finished in a second-place tie with Illinois with an 11–5 conference record, one game behind Ohio State. However, the Hawkeyes defeated Minnesota, Michigan State, and Ohio State to win the Big Ten tournament and finish 25–8 going into its third NCAA tournament under Alford. They were seeded #3 in the Atlanta Regional of the 2006 NCAA tournament, but lost in a first-round upset to No. 14 seed Northwestern State 64–63, leaving Alford with only one NCAA tournament win since taking over at Iowa.

During the 2006–2007 season, Alford led the Hawkeyes to an 8–6 non-conference record (losing to in-state rivals Drake and Northern Iowa) and a 9–7 record in the Big Ten Conference (17–14 overall). Iowa failed to make the NCAA tournament or the NIT. It marked the first time since the 1976–1977 season that an Iowa team with a winning record has failed to make either the NCAA tournament or the NIT.

At the conclusion of the 2006–2007 season, Alford resigned from the University of Iowa to accept the coaching position at the University of New Mexico. He led the Hawkeyes to the NCAA tournament three times, but had a 61–67 record in the Big Ten, only once finishing higher than fourth in the conference.

=== New Mexico Lobos ===
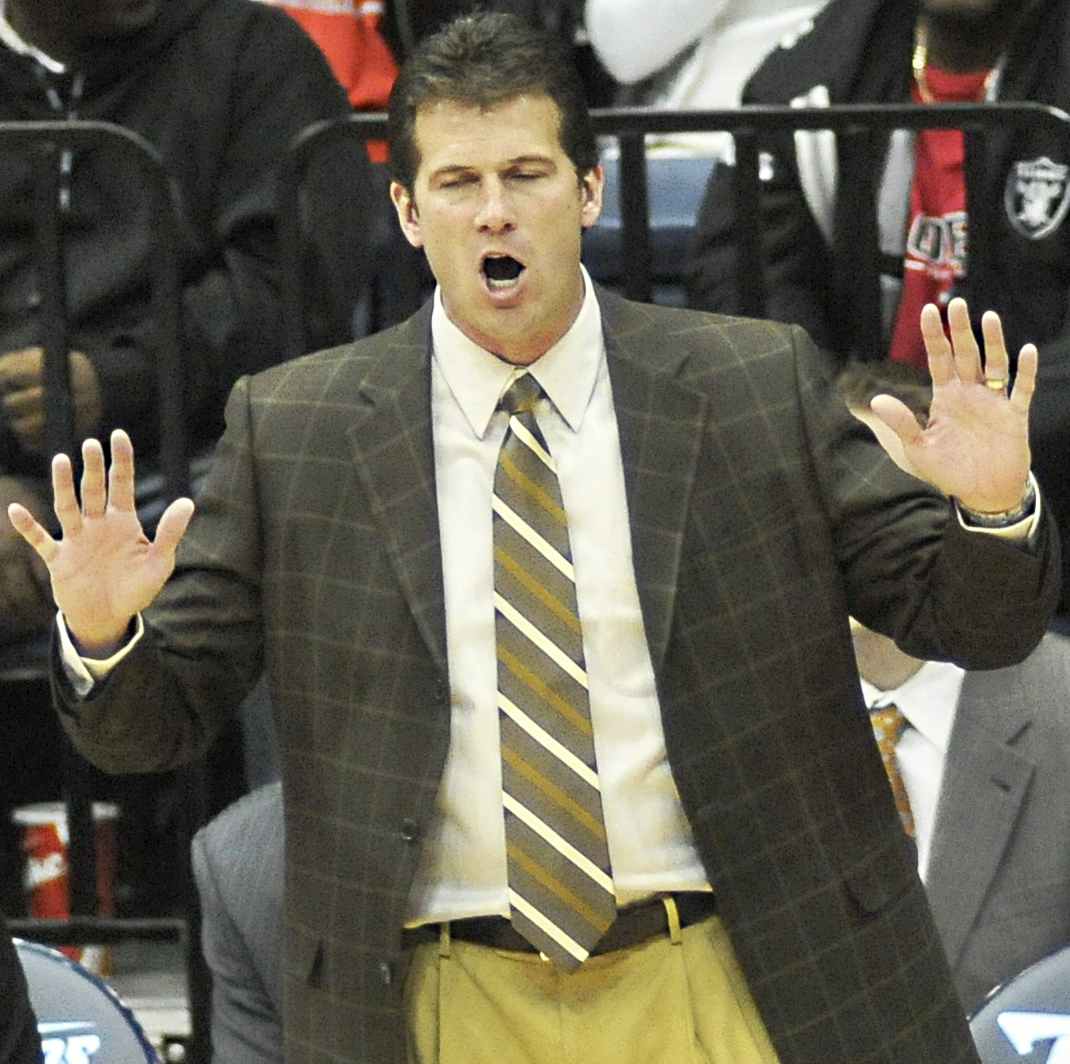
Alford with New Mexico in 2008

Alford was named head coach at the University of New Mexico on March 23, 2007, replacing the fired Ritchie McKay. In his first year as the Lobos coach Alford posted a record of 24–9, 11–5 in league play. Twenty-four wins is the most for a New Mexico head coach in their first year. The Lobos were led by future 1st round Boston Celtics draft pick J. R. Giddens. The Lobos were eliminated in the first round of the NIT by Cal.

In his second season, led by seniors Daniel Faris, Tony Danridge and Chad Toppert, Alford guided the Lobos to their first conference championship in 15 years. He earned the MWC Coach of the Year Award for his team's performance. Alford also set a record for most wins in the first two seasons for a UNM head coach. Alford and his New Mexico squad fell just short of the NCAA tourney and ended up with their second consecutive NIT bid. They won a first round home game against Nebraska and lost on a last second buzzer beater on the road to Notre Dame.

His third year, coaching a mostly young, untested team, Alford's Lobos nevertheless won the regular season MWC title for the second year in a row, were ranked in the top 15 for the majority of the year, and earned a #3 seed in the NCAA tournament, the team's first bid since 2005. In the first round, they survived a tough game against Montana 62–57, but despite Dairese Gary's 28 points, fell in the second round to an upstart Washington side. At the end of the season Coach Alford received a ten-year contract extension through the 2019–2020 season.

The 2010–2011 season started with Alford's group at 12–4 after non-conference play, but the team struggled to an 8–8 conference regular season record. Drew Gordon and Dairese Gary led a talented team that underachieved much throughout the year into the conference tournament. The team seemed poised to make a run in the MWC conference tournament, but a tragic ACL injury to Gary in the semi-finals against BYU proved to be too much to overcome for this young UNM squad. Alford also had a confrontation with a Brigham Young player in which Alford called him an "extremely vulgar" name, according to the Wall Street Journal. Their 2010–2011 season ended with an NIT loss to Alabama 74–67. However, with everyone coming back (with the exception of Gary), the following season seemed to hold promise.

The 2011–2012 season began with a rough patch. UNM was picked to win the league for the first time in Alford's five years at the helm, but the team started a questionable 2–2 with losses to home state rival NMSU and a bottom feeder WCC team in Santa Clara. UNM then raced off to a twelve-game win streak and finished the non-conference season at 14–2. UNM then went on to have a 10–4 conference regular season record and a share of the conference title with arch-rival San Diego State. It was only fitting that the regular season co-champions would square off in the MWC tournament title game. With Drew Gordon and Demetrius Walker leading a battle tested UNM team in the championship, Alford and his Lobos prevailed to a 69–58 conference tournament title. UNM received a fifth seed in the NCAA West region, and they defeated Casper Ware and the Long Beach State 49ers in their first game of the NCAA tournament. The Lobos lost to the Louisville Cardinals in their next game.

In the 2012–2013 season, with a vicious defensive team, Alford led his Lobo squad to a 26–5 regular season record, winning the Mountain West Regular Season conference title. Alford won his third MWC coach of the year honor, and New Mexico garnered another Player of the Year award in Kendall Williams. New Mexico was primed to make a deep run in the NCAA tournament after winning the MWC conference tournament for the second straight year. At 29–5 entering the tournament, New Mexico was an early favorite as a Final Four participant by several analysts and publications, but Alford and his No. 3 seed Lobos were upset by an underdog 14th-seeded Harvard team, who won their first NCAA tournament game in school history.

=== UCLA Bruins ===
==== Three Sweet Sixteens in four years ====
On March 30, 2013, Alford signed a seven-year, $18.2-million contract to become the head coach of the UCLA Bruins, joining a program that has won a record 11 national titles. He replaced the fired Ben Howland, who was coming off a blowout loss in the first round of the 2013 NCAA tournament after UCLA had captured the Pac-12 Conference regular season title with a new up-tempo offense. Overall, Howland won four conference titles and reached the Final Four three straight times (2006–2008) with the Bruins. Alford had a 5–7 NCAA tournament record, and had only advanced his teams beyond the first weekend of the tournament once before, when he led his Cinderella squad from Southwest Missouri State to the Sweet 16 in 1999. UCLA tasked Alford with reviving their offense, connecting with a new generation of players, and rejuvenating its fan base. He accepted the UCLA position just three days after he had signed a 10-year extension at New Mexico. At UCLA's introductory news conference, Alford was questioned about his handling of Pierce in Iowa, and he stated that he did "everything that [he] was told to do." Criticism grew over his hiring, especially over his handling of Pierce. Two weeks after his hiring, Alford apologized for declaring Pierce's innocence "before the legal system had run its course. This was inappropriate, insensitive and hurtful, especially to the young female victim involved, and I apologize for that."

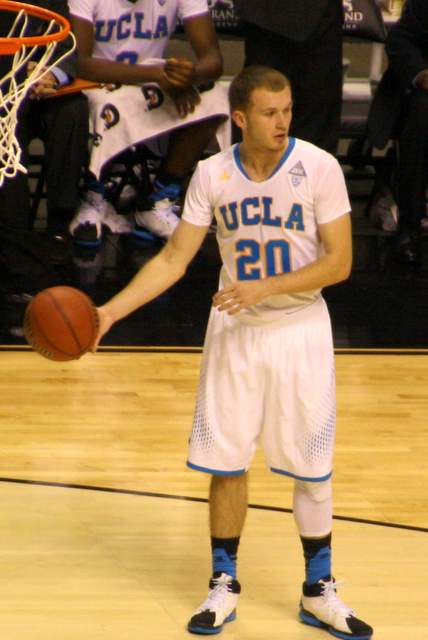
Alford's son Bryce as a freshman in 2014, when he was UCLA's backup point guard

Soon after his hiring, Alford filled his head assistant coaching staff position with good friend and former John Calipari assistant Ed Schilling. Also hired were David Grace, a rising assistant who spent 2008–2013 on the Oregon State staff, and Duane Broussard, who spent 2008–2013 as Alford's assistant at New Mexico. Tyus Edney, who starred on UCLA's 1995 national championship team, continued as director of operations. In his first season, fans accused Alford of nepotism for playing his son Bryce over fellow freshman Zach LaVine. The Bruins had rarely sought players who were not four- or five-star recruits, while Bryce was rated a consensus three-star prospect. The coach groomed his son over LaVine to be the team's backup point guard behind starter Kyle Anderson. Alford directed the Bruins to the title in the 2014 Pac-12 tournament, the school's first conference tournament title in six years. They advanced to the Sweet 16 of the 2014 NCAA tournament—their first regional semifinal appearance since 2008—before falling to Florida, who improved to 4–0 all-time against UCLA in the NCAA tournament.

After Anderson and LaVine left UCLA for the National Basketball Association (NBA), Bryce became the Bruins' starting point guard in 2014–15. Although he was considered more of a shooter than a true point guard, Alford's son was the team's only legitimate option for the position. The Bruins began the season at 4–0 and ranked No. 22 before losing two of three games at the Battle 4 Atlantis tournament. Beginning with their December loss at home to Gonzaga, the Bruins lost five consecutive games, their longest streak since 2009–10. Losses included a 39-point defeat to No. 1 Kentucky—they fell behind 24–0 and trailed 41–7 at halftime—and by 32 points against Utah. UCLA closed out the regular season with three straight home wins to finish undefeated (9–0) at home in the conference for the first time since 2006–07. The Bruins went 1–1 in the 2015 Pac-12 tournament, but proved most major projections wrong by receiving an invitation to the 2015 NCAA tournament, earning a No. 11 seed. The squad became the lowest-seed UCLA team to ever reach the regional semifinals. They benefitted from a controversial goaltending call and a favorable second-round matchup with No. 14 seed Alabama Birmingham to advance to the Sweet 16, when they lost again to Gonzaga.

==== Fanbase grows restless (2015–2018) ====
In 2015–16, UCLA finished with a 15–17 record, including a non-conference loss to Monmouth, the fourth time the program finished with a losing record since 1948, when John Wooden became the coach. The team missed the NCAA tournament for just the third time in 10 years. The Bruins were eliminated from the 2016 Pac-12 tournament after a 95–71 loss to USC, losing three consecutive times in the same season to their crosstown rivals for the first time in 74 years. One week during the offseason, a plane flew over the UCLA campus on two occasions with a banner urging the school to fire Alford. A week later, Alford apologized for what he called an "unacceptable" season, and he returned a one-year contract extension he had received in 2014. He pledged to never allow their defense to rank outside the top 100 nationally. The following year, Alford led a talented squad that featured three eventual NBA first-round draft picks and five future NBA players. The Bruins finished one game out of first place in the Pac-12, and UCLA advanced to its third Sweet 16 in four years as freshmen Lonzo Ball and T. J. Leaf led one of the top offensive teams in the nation.

In 2017–18, UCLA opened its new practice facility, the Mo Ostin Basketball Center. The team again struggled defensively. UCLA qualified for the 2018 NCAA tournament, but lost 65–58 to St. Bonaventure in the First Four for the Bonnies' first tournament win in 48 years. It was the first time in UCLA's history that they had been relegated to a First Four play-in game. It was also the first time in the school's four tournament appearances under Alford that they did not advance to the Sweet 16. Another banner was flown over campus, this time reading "Final Fours not First Fours #FireAlford."

In 2018–19, Alford's sixth year at UCLA, he brought in a top-10 recruiting class which included 7-foot-1-inch (2.16 m) center Moses Brown. He also added assistant coach Murry Bartow to improve the team's defense. The Bruins were ranked No. 21 in the preseason AP Poll, and they started the season 4–0 to move up to No. 17. However, they lost six of the next nine and finished with a 7–6 record in nonconference play, closing it out with four straight losses, the last of which was a 73–58 defeat to Liberty. The 15-point setback was the most lopsided home loss in Alford's tenure with UCLA. Combined with an earlier home loss to mid-major program Belmont, it was the first time the Bruins had lost consecutive home games to non-Power Five schools since 2012–13. Four days after Belmont, they lost 93–64 at Cincinnati, their largest margin of defeat since 2014–15. Their offense had grown stagnant. As the losses mounted, Alford increasingly blamed his players. UCLA had not lost four straight since the end of 2015–16, when they finished the season under .500. They had not suffered four consecutive nonconference losses since 2010–11. On December 31, 2018, two days after the Bruins' loss to Liberty, UCLA announced that Alford had been fired. It was the first time the program had made a coaching change in the middle of the season.

Alford ended his tenure with a 124–63 overall record and 55–35 in the Pac-12. He guided UCLA to the NCAA tournament four times in five years, including three times to the Sweet 16. However, he failed to win a Pac-12 regular-season title, and his only Pac-12 Tournament title was in his first season. He never advanced past the Sweet 16. He was only the second coach in UCLA's 100-year history to never win a conference regular-season title; his highest finish was second place in his first season. During his tenure, UCLA had 11 players selected in the NBA draft, including seven first-round picks.

=== Nevada ===
Alford was hired as the coach of Nevada Wolf Pack on April 11, 2019. He replaced Eric Musselman, who left after leading the Wolf Pack to three NCAA tournaments in four seasons. On September 24, 2026, Alford said that he would retire from coaching after the end of the 2026–27 season.

== Career statistics ==
Legend
GP	Games played	GS	Games started	MPG	Minutes per game
FG%	Field goal percentage	3P%	3-point field goal percentage	FT%	Free throw percentage
RPG	Rebounds per game	APG	Assists per game	SPG	Steals per game
BPG	Blocks per game	PPG	Points per game	**Bold**	Career high

=== NBA ===
==== Regular season ====
Year	Team	GP	GS	MPG	FG%	3P%	FT%	RPG	APG	SPG	BPG	PPG
1987–88	Dallas	28	0	7.0	.382	.125	.941	.8	.8	.6	**.1**	2.1
1988–89	Dallas	9	0	4.2	.273	.000	.500	.3	1.0	.1	.0	.8
1988–89	Golden State	**57**	**3**	**15.2**	.463	**.377**	.831	**1.2**	**1.5**	**.8**	**.1**	**6.3**
1989–90	Dallas	41	0	7.4	.457	.318	**.946**	.6	1.0	.4	**.1**	4.1
1990–91	Dallas	34	0	6.9	**.504**	.304	.839	.7	.6	.2	.0	4.4
Career		169	3	9.7	.459	.324	.870	.9	1.0	.5	.1	4.4

==== Playoffs ====
Year	Team	GP	GS	MPG	FG%	3P%	FT%	RPG	APG	SPG	BPG	PPG
1988	Dallas	4	0	3.0	.375	.000	—	.5	.5	.0	.0	1.5
1989	Golden State	**6**	0	9.7	.409	**.444**	.750	.7	.8	**.3**	.0	4.2
1990	Dallas	3	0	**14.0**	**.444**	.333	**1.000**	**1.0**	**2.7**	**.3**	.0	**7.7**
Career		13	0	8.2	.417	.353	.889	.7	1.2	.2	.0	4.2

=== College ===
Year	Team	GP	GS	MPG	FG%	3P%	FT%	RPG	APG	SPG	BPG	PPG
1983–84	Indiana	31	27	38.0	.592		.913	2.6	3.2	1.5	0.1	15.5
1984–85	Indiana	32	31	36.0	.538		.921	3.2	2.7	1.4	0.0	18.1
1985–86	Indiana	28	28	37.0	.556		.871	2.7	2.8	1.8	0.0	22.5
1986–87	Indiana	34	34	37.0	.474	.530	.889	2.6	3.6	1.1	.0.1	22.0
Career		125	120	37.0	.533	.530	.898	2.8	3.1	1.4	0.1	19.5

== Head coaching record ==
Record table
Season	Team	Overall	Conference	Standing	Postseason
Manchester Spartans (Heartland Collegiate Athletic Conference) (1991–1995)
1991–92	Manchester	4–16	3–11	T–6th	
1992–93	Manchester	20–8	7–5	T–2nd	NCAA Division III First Round
1993–94	Manchester	23–4	10–2	1st	NCAA Division III Second Round
1994–95	Manchester	31–1	12–0	1st	NCAA Division III Runner-up
Manchester:		78–29 (.729)	32–18 (.640)		
Southwest Missouri State Bears (Missouri Valley Conference) (1995–1999)
1995–96	Southwest Missouri State	16–12	11–7	4th	
1996–97	Southwest Missouri State	24–9	12–6	T–2nd	NIT First Round
1997–98	Southwest Missouri State	16–16	11–7	T–3rd	
1998–99	Southwest Missouri State	22–11	11–7	T–2nd	NCAA Division I Sweet 16
Southwest Missouri State:		78–48 (.619)	45–27 (.625)		
Iowa Hawkeyes (Big Ten Conference) (1999–2007)
1999–00	Iowa	14–16	6–10	T–7th	
2000–01	Iowa	23–12	7–9	T–6th	NCAA Division I Round of 32
2001–02	Iowa	19–16	5–11	T–8th	NIT First Round
2002–03	Iowa	17–14	7–9	T–8th	NIT Second Round
2003–04	Iowa	16–13	9–7	4th	NIT First Round
2004–05	Iowa	21–12	7–9	7th	NCAA Division I Round of 64
2005–06	Iowa	25–9	11–5	T–2nd	NCAA Division I Round of 64
2006–07	Iowa	17–14	9–7	T–4th	
Iowa:		152–106 (.589)	61–67 (.477)		
New Mexico Lobos (Mountain West Conference) (2007–2013)
2007–08	New Mexico	24–9	11–5	3rd	NIT First Round
2008–09	New Mexico	22–12	12–4	T–1st	NIT Second Round
2009–10	New Mexico	30–5	14–2	1st	NCAA Division I Round of 32
2010–11	New Mexico	22–13	8–8	5th	NIT Second Round
2011–12	New Mexico	28–7	10–4	T–1st	NCAA Division I Round of 32
2012–13	New Mexico	29–6	13–3	1st	NCAA Division I Round of 64
New Mexico:		155–52 (.749)	68–26 (.723)		
UCLA Bruins (Pac-12 Conference) (2013–2018)
2013–14	UCLA	28–9	12–6	2nd	NCAA Division I Sweet 16
2014–15	UCLA	22–14	11–7	4th	NCAA Division I Sweet 16
2015–16	UCLA	15–17	6–12	10th	
2016–17	UCLA	31–5	15–3	3rd	NCAA Division I Sweet 16
2017–18	UCLA	21–12	11–7	T–3rd	NCAA Division I First Four
2018–19	UCLA	7–6 (Note: Alford was dismissed by UCLA on December 31, 2018, prior to the start of Pac-12 play.)	0–0		
UCLA:		124–63 (.663)	55–35 (.611)		
Nevada Wolf Pack (Mountain West Conference) (2019–present)
2019–20	Nevada	19–12	12–6	T–2nd	
2020–21	Nevada	16–10	10–7	5th	
2021–22	Nevada	13–18	6–12	8th	
2022–23	Nevada	22–11	12–6	4th	NCAA Division I First Four
2023–24	Nevada	26–8	13–5	T–2nd	NCAA Division I Round of 64
2024–25	Nevada	17–16	8–12	7th	
2025–26	Nevada	24–13	10–8	T–5th	NIT Quarterfinals
2026–27	Nevada	0–0	0–0		
Nevada:		137–88 (.609)	71–56 (.559)		
Total:		724–383 (.654)			
National champion Postseason invitational champion Conference regular season champion Conference regular season and conference tournament champion Division regular season champion Division regular season and conference tournament champion Conference tournament champion

== Personal life ==
Alford has three children, Kory, Bryce and Kayla. Kory played for the elder Alford at New Mexico and transferred with him to UCLA, and is now head coach at Huntington University. Bryce also played under Alford at UCLA, and ended his career as the school's career leader in three-pointers made. He became a professional basketball player and is currently coaching.

Alford is a Christian. He has spoken openly about his faith, saying, "I'm a Christian first. I'm a family guy second. As much as I like coaching, as much as I like basketball, it's third, fourth, or fifth down the line."

Awards and achievements
Preceded by Roger Harden	Indiana Mr. Basketball; 1983	Succeeded by Troy Lewis & Delray Brooks
