= 2000–01 Wisconsin Badgers men's basketball team =

American college basketball season

2000–01 Wisconsin Badgers men's basketball

2001 NCAA Division I men's basketball tournament, Round of 64
- Conference: Big Ten Conference

Ranking
- AP: No. 25
- Record: 18–11 (9–7 Big Ten)
- Head coach: Dick Bennett (6th season; first 3 games); Brad Soderberg (remaining 26 games)
- Assistant coaches: Shawn Hood; Tony Bennett
- Home arena: Kohl Center

2000–01 Big Ten Conference men's basketball standings
	Conf.				Overall
Team	W		L	PCT	W		L	PCT
No. 4 Illinois	13	–	3	.813	27	–	8	.771
No. 3 Michigan State	13	–	3	.813	28	–	5	.848
No. 20 Indiana	10	–	6	.625	21	–	13	.618
No. 25 Wisconsin	9	–	7	.563	18	–	11	.621
No. 24 Iowa †	7	–	9	.438	23	–	12	.657
Penn State	7	–	9	.438	21	–	12	.636
Purdue	6	–	10	.375	17	–	15	.531
Minnesota	5	–	11	.313	18	–	14	.563
Michigan	4	–	12	.250	10	–	18	.357
Northwestern	3	–	13	.188	11	–	19	.367
Ohio State*	0	–	0	–	0	–	0	–
† 2001 Big Ten tournament winner Rankings from AP poll *Ohio State: 30 reg. season games; 1 NCAA Tourn. game vacated due to sanctions against the program Disputed record: Ohio State-(20-11)(11-5)

The 2000–01 Wisconsin Badgers men's basketball team represented University of Wisconsin–Madison. The head coach was Dick Bennett, coaching his sixth season with the Badgers. Bennett resigned after the third game of the season citing burnout – he said he "simply was drained". Assistant coach Brad Soderberg took over as the interim head coach for the remainder of the season. The team played its home games at the Kohl Center in Madison, Wisconsin and was a member of the Big Ten Conference. Wisconsin finished 18–11, 9–7 in Big Ten play to finish in fifth place. The Badgers received an at-large bid to the NCAA tournament as the No. 6 seed in the West Region, where they were upset by Georgia State, 50–49.

== Roster ==
2000–01 Wisconsin Badgers men's basketball team
Players
Coaches

Pos.	#	Name	Height	Weight	Year	Hometown
G	2	Travon Davis	5 ft 10 in (1.78 m)	180 lb (82 kg)	Jr	Argo, IL
G	3	Pete Schmit (W)	6 ft 0 in (1.83 m)	160 lb (73 kg)	Fr	Saint Charles, IL
F	5	Maurice Linton	6 ft 8 in (2.03 m)	210 lb (95 kg)	Sr	Calumet City, IL
G	13	Ike Ukawuba (W)	6 ft 3 in (1.91 m)	175 lb (79 kg)	Fr	Chicago, IL
G	14	Ricky Bower	6 ft 4 in (1.93 m)	185 lb (84 kg)	So	Meridian, ID
F	15	Andy Kowske	6 ft 8 in (2.03 m)	230 lb (104 kg)	Sr	Brookfield, WI
G	20	Kirk Penney	6 ft 5 in (1.96 m)	205 lb (93 kg)	So	Auckland
F	21	Kyle Grusczynski	6 ft 7 in (2.01 m)	200 lb (91 kg)	Fr	Seymour, WI
G	22	Mike Kelley	6 ft 3 in (1.91 m)	190 lb (86 kg)	Sr	Menomonee Falls, WI
G	24	Freddie Owens	6 ft 2 in (1.88 m)	180 lb (82 kg)	Fr	Milwaukee, WI
F/C	30	Dave Mader	6 ft 11 in (2.11 m)	250 lb (113 kg)	RS Fr	Appleton, WI
G	32	Roy Boone	6 ft 3 in (1.91 m)	195 lb (88 kg)	Sr	Madison, WI
F	40	Charlie Wills	6 ft 8 in (2.03 m)	230 lb (104 kg)	RS Jr	Angola, IN
F	50	Mark Vershaw	6 ft 9 in (2.06 m)	235 lb (107 kg)	Sr	East Peoria, IL
F	54	Mike Wilkinson (redshirt)	6 ft 8 in (2.03 m)	205 lb (93 kg)	Fr	Blue Mounds, WI

Head coach

- Dick Bennett (Ripon)

Assistant coach(es)

- Brad Soderberg (Ripon)
- Shawn Hood
- Tony Bennett (UW-Green Bay)

Legend

- (C) Team captain
- (S) Suspended
- (I) Ineligible
- (W) Walk-on
- Injured
- Current redshirt

Roster
Last update: 2014-1-13

== Schedule ==
Date time, TV	Rank^{#}	Opponent^{#}	Result	Record	Site city, state
Regular Season
11/21/2000*	No. 18	at No. 9 Tennessee	L 58–66	0–1	Thompson–Boling Arena; Knoxville, TN
11/25/2000*	No. 18	Northern Illinois	W 68–64	1–1	Kohl Center; Madison, WI
11/29/2000*	No. 23	vs. No. 13 Maryland; ACC–Big Ten Challenge	W 78–75 ^{OT}	2–1	Bradley Center; Milwaukee, WI
12/02/2000*	No. 23	Xavier	W 61–46	3–1	Kohl Center; Madison, WI
12/06/2000*	No. 17	at UW–Green Bay	W 61–53	4–1	Brown County Veterans Memorial Arena; Ashwaubenon, WI
12/09/2000*	No. 17	Ohio	W 65–46	5–1	Kohl Center; Madison, WI
12/14/2000*	No. 16	at Temple	W 66–58	6–1	Liacouras Center; Philadelphia, PA
12/16/2000*	No. 16	UW–Milwaukee	W 55–47	7–1	Kohl Center; Madison, WI
12/23/2000*	No. 16	at Marquette	W 52–47	8–1	Bradley Center; Milwaukee, WI
12/30/2000*	No. 13	South Florida	W 63–61 ^{OT}	9–1	Kohl Center; Madison, WI
1/03/2001	No. 12	Indiana	W 49–46	10–1 (1–0)	Kohl Center; Madison, WI
1/06/2001	No. 12	at Minnesota	L 49–54	10–2 (1–1)	Williams Arena; Minneapolis, MN
1/10/2001	No. 17	at Purdue	L 67–73	10–3 (1–2)	Mackey Arena; West Lafayette, IN
1/13/2001	No. 17	at No. 3 Michigan State	L 59–69 ^{OT}	10–4 (1–3)	Breslin Center; East Lansing, MI
1/16/2001	No. 19	No. 14 Iowa	W 67–54	11–4 (2–3)	Kohl Center; Madison, WI
1/24/2001	No. 15	Ohio State	W 57–42	12–4 (3–3)	Kohl Center; Madison, WI
1/27/2001	No. 15	Penn State	W 63–58	13–4 (4–3)	Kohl Center; Madison, WI
1/30/2001*	No. 10	Butler	L 44–58	13–5	Kohl Center; Madison, WI
2/03/2001	No. 10	at Michigan	W 60–41	14–5 (5–3)	Crisler Arena; Ann Arbor, MI
2/07/2001	No. 16	Purdue	W 73–54	15–5 (6–3)	Kohl Center; Madison, WI
2/10/2001	No. 16	at Ohio State	L 58–63	15–6 (6–4)	Value City Arena; Columbus, OH
2/13/2001	No. 19	at No. 4 Illinois	L 67–68	15–7 (6–5)	Assembly Hall; Champaign, IL
2/18/2001	No. 19	Northwestern	W 59–37	16–7 (7–5)	Kohl Center; Madison, WI
2/21/2001	No. 19	Minnesota	W 64–54	17–7 (8–5)	Kohl Center; Madison, WI
2/24/2001; 1:00, CBS	No. 19	Indiana	L 55–85	17–8 (8–6)	Assembly Hall; Bloomington, IN
2/27/2001	No. 22	No. 3 Michigan State	L 47–51	17–9 (8–7)	Kohl Center; Madison, WI
3/03/2001	No. 22	at Iowa	W 59–57	18–9 (9–7)	Carver–Hawkeye Arena; Iowa City, IA
Big Ten tournament
3/09/2001	(5) No. 23	vs. (4) Indiana; Big Ten tournament - Quarterfinals	L 52–64	18–10	United Center; Chicago, IL
NCAA tournament
3/15/2001*; CBS	(6 W) No. 25	vs. (11 W) Georgia State; NCAA Tournament - First Round	L 49–50	18–11	BSU Pavilion; Boise, ID
*Non-conference game. ^{#}Rankings from AP Poll. (#) Tournament seedings in parentheses.
