= 2000–01 Ohio State Buckeyes men's basketball team =

American college basketball season

2000–01 Ohio State Buckeyes men's basketball

NCAA tournament, first round (vacated)
- Conference: Big Ten
- Record: 0–0 (20–11 unadjusted) (11–5 Big Ten)
- Head coach: Jim O'Brien (4th season)
- Home arena: Value City Arena

2000–01 Big Ten Conference men's basketball standings
	Conf.				Overall
Team	W		L	PCT	W		L	PCT
No. 4 Illinois	13	–	3	.813	27	–	8	.771
No. 3 Michigan State	13	–	3	.813	28	–	5	.848
No. 20 Indiana	10	–	6	.625	21	–	13	.618
No. 25 Wisconsin	9	–	7	.563	18	–	11	.621
No. 24 Iowa †	7	–	9	.438	23	–	12	.657
Penn State	7	–	9	.438	21	–	12	.636
Purdue	6	–	10	.375	17	–	15	.531
Minnesota	5	–	11	.313	18	–	14	.563
Michigan	4	–	12	.250	10	–	18	.357
Northwestern	3	–	13	.188	11	–	19	.367
Ohio State*	0	–	0	–	0	–	0	–
† 2001 Big Ten tournament winner Rankings from AP poll *Ohio State: 30 reg. season games; 1 NCAA Tourn. game vacated due to sanctions against the program Disputed record: Ohio State-(20-11)(11-5)

The 2000–01 Ohio State Buckeyes men's basketball team represented the Ohio State University during the 2000–01 NCAA Division I men's basketball season. The Buckeyes received an at-large bid to the NCAA tournament as No. 5 seed in the East region, but were upset by No. 12 seed Utah State in the first round. The Buckeyes finished with a record of 20–11 (11–5 Big Ten), but all 31 games – including the NCAA Tournament appearance – were later vacated due to NCAA sanctions as a result of the Jim O’Brien scandal.

== Roster ==
2000–01 Ohio State Buckeyes men's basketball team
Players
Coaches

Pos.	#	Name	Height	Weight	Year	Hometown
G	13	Brian Brown	6 ft 4 in (1.93 m)	200 lb (91 kg)	Jr	Brooklyn, New York
G	21	Boban Savović	6 ft 5 in (1.96 m)	240 lb (109 kg)	Jr
C	32	Ken Johnson	6 ft 11 in (2.11 m)	235 lb (107 kg)	Sr	Detroit, Michigan

Head coach

- Jim O'Brien

Assistant coach(es)

Legend

- (C) Team captain
- (S) Suspended
- (I) Ineligible
- (W) Walk-on
- Injured
- Current redshirt

== Schedule and results ==
Date time, TV	Rank^{#}	Opponent^{#}	Result	Record	Site city, state
Regular season
Nov 17, 2000*		Yale	W 65–45	1–0	Jerome Schottenstein Center; Columbus, Ohio
Nov 23, 2000*		vs. Florida State; Great Alaska Shootout	W 90–65	2–0	Sullivan Arena; Anchorage, Alaska
Nov 24, 2000*		vs. Syracuse; Great Alaska Shootout	L 66–77	2–1	Sullivan Arena; Anchorage, Alaska
Nov 25, 2000*		vs. Valparaiso; Great Alaska Shootout	L 64–67	2–2	Sullivan Arena; Anchorage, Alaska
Big Ten tournament
Mar 9, 2001*	No. 24	vs. Iowa; Quarterfinals	L 66–75	20–10	United Center; Chicago, Illinois
NCAA Tournament
Mar 15, 2001*	(5 E)	vs. (12 E) Utah State; First Round	L 68–77 ^{OT}	20–11	Greensboro Coliseum; Greensboro, North Carolina
*Non-conference game. ^{#}Rankings from AP poll. (#) Tournament seedings in parentheses.
