= 2000–01 Indiana Hoosiers men's basketball team =

American college basketball season

2000–01 Indiana Hoosiers men's basketball

NCAA men's Division I tournament, Round of 64
- Conference: Big Ten Conference

Ranking
- AP: No. 20
- Record: 21–13 (10–6 Big Ten)
- Head coach: Mike Davis (1st season)
- Assistant coaches: John Treloar; Julius Smith; Dan Panaggio
- Home arena: Assembly Hall

2000–01 Big Ten Conference men's basketball standings
	Conf.				Overall
Team	W		L	PCT	W		L	PCT
No. 4 Illinois	13	–	3	.813	27	–	8	.771
No. 3 Michigan State	13	–	3	.813	28	–	5	.848
No. 20 Indiana	10	–	6	.625	21	–	13	.618
No. 25 Wisconsin	9	–	7	.563	18	–	11	.621
No. 24 Iowa †	7	–	9	.438	23	–	12	.657
Penn State	7	–	9	.438	21	–	12	.636
Purdue	6	–	10	.375	17	–	15	.531
Minnesota	5	–	11	.313	18	–	14	.563
Michigan	4	–	12	.250	10	–	18	.357
Northwestern	3	–	13	.188	11	–	19	.367
Ohio State*	0	–	0	–	0	–	0	–
† 2001 Big Ten tournament winner Rankings from AP poll *Ohio State: 30 reg. season games; 1 NCAA Tourn. game vacated due to sanctions against the program Disputed record: Ohio State-(20-11)(11-5)

The 2000–01 Indiana Hoosiers men's basketball team represented Indiana University. At the beginning of the season, the head coach was Bobby Knight; however, Knight was fired in early September 2000, and Mike Davis was named interim head coach. The team played its home games in the Assembly Hall in Bloomington, Indiana, and was a member of the Big Ten Conference.

The Hoosiers finished the regular season with an overall record of 21–13 and a conference record of 10–6, finishing 3rd in the Big Ten Conference. After losing in the championship game of the Big Ten tournament to Iowa, the Hoosiers earned a 4-seed in the 2001 NCAA tournament. However, IU quickly exited with a first round loss to 13-seed Kent State.

== Roster ==
2000–01 Indiana Hoosiers men's basketball team
Players
Coaches

Pos.	#	Name	Height	Weight	Year	Hometown
F	1	Jared Jeffries	6 ft 10 in (2.08 m)	—	Fr	Bloomington, Indiana
G	2	A.J. Moye	6 ft 3 in (1.91 m)	—	Fr	Atlanta
G	3	Tom Coverdale	6 ft 2 in (1.88 m)	—	So	Noblesville, Indiana
F/C	5	George Leach	6 ft 11 in (2.11 m)	—	Fr	Charlotte, North Carolina
G	11	Dane Fife	6 ft 4 in (1.93 m)	—	Jr	Clarkston, Michigan
G	20	Andre Owens	6 ft 2 in (1.88 m)	—	Fr	Indianapolis, Indiana
G/F	32	Kyle Hornsby	6 ft 5 in (1.96 m)	—	So	Anacoco, Louisiana
G	33	Mike Roberts	6 ft 9 in (2.06 m)	—	Fr	Eugene, Oregon
F/C	35	Kirk Haston	6 ft 10 in (2.08 m)	—	Jr	Lobelville, Tennessee
F	43	Jarrad Odle	6 ft 8 in (2.03 m)	—	Jr	Swayzee, Indiana
F	50	Jeff Newton	6 ft 9 in (2.06 m)	—	So	Atlanta

Head coach

- Bobby Knight
- Mike Davis (interim)

Assistant coach(es)

- John Treloar
- Julius Smith
- Dan Panaggio

Legend

- (C) Team captain
- (S) Suspended
- (I) Ineligible
- (W) Walk-on
- Injured
- Current redshirt

== Schedule/results ==
Date time, TV	Rank^{#}	Opponent^{#}	Result	Record	High points	High rebounds	High assists	Site (attendance) city, state
Regular season
November 14, 2000*; 7:00 pm, ESPN		Pepperdine; Tivo Preseason NIT First Round	W 80–68	1–0	28 – Haston	14 – Haston	8 – Coverdale	Assembly Hall; Bloomington, Indiana
November 17, 2000*; 8:00 pm, ESPN Plus		South Alabama; Tivo Preseason NIT Second Round	W 70–62	2–0	21 – Haston	11 – Haston	4 – Tied	Assembly Hall (12,581); Bloomington, Indiana
November 22, 2000*; 7:00 pm, ESPN		vs. No. 25 Temple; Tivo Preseason NIT Semifinals	L 61–69	2–1	16 – Owens	7 – Leach	6 – Fife	Madison Square Garden; New York City
November 24, 2000*; 6:00 pm		vs. Texas; Tivo Preseason NIT Consolation	L 58–70	2–2	22 – Haston	12 – Haston	8 – Fife	Madison Square Garden; New York City
November 29, 2000*; 8:00 pm, Fox Sports Net Midwest		at Indiana State	L 58–59	2–3	19 – Jefferies	10 – Haston	9 – Coverdale	Hulman Center (10,220); Terre Haute, Indiana
December 2, 2000*; 1:00 pm, ESPN Plus		Southern Illinois	W 85–63	3–3	21 – Jefferies	9 – Coverdale	10 – Coverdale	Assembly Hall (12,486); Bloomington, Indiana
December 5, 2000*; 9:00 pm, ESPN		at No. 10 Notre Dame	W 86–78	4–3	30 – Coverdale	8 – Tied	4 – Coverdale	Joyce Center (11,418); Notre Dame, Indiana
December 8, 2000*; 6:00 pm, ESPN Plus		Western Michigan; Indiana Classic	W 87–59	5–3	22 – Owens	9 – Haston	6 – Coverdale	Assembly Hall (12,319); Bloomington, Indiana
December 9, 2000*; 7:00 pm, ESPN Plus		Ball State; Indiana Classic	W 65–50	6–3	16 – Hornsby	8 – Haston	10 – Coverdale	Assembly Hall (12,470); Bloomington, Indiana
December 16, 2000*; 3:00 pm, ESPN Plus		No. 24 Charlotte	W 76–72	7–3	19 – Tied	11 – Haston	6 – Coverdale	Assembly Hall (12,719); Bloomington, Indiana
December 18, 2000*; 7:00 pm, ESPN2		Missouri	L 63–68	7–4	18 – Jefferies	12 – Newton	3 – Coverdale	Assembly Hall (12,517); Bloomington, Indiana
December 22, 2000*; 9:00 pm, ESPN		vs. Kentucky; Indiana–Kentucky rivalry	L 74–88	7–5	18 – Haston	4 – Haston	3 – Fife	Freedom Hall (20,059); Louisville, Kentucky
December 28, 2000*; 7:00 pm, ESPN Plus		vs. Northeastern; Hoosier Classic	W 103–65	8–5	20 – Owens	8 – Tied	8 – Coverdale	Conseco Fieldhouse (10,020); Indianapolis
December 29, 2000*; 7:00 pm, ESPN Plus		Valparaiso; Hoosier Classic	W 63–60	9–5	17 – Coverdale	8 – Haston	4 – Coverdale	Conseco Fieldhouse (10,891); Indianapolis
January 4, 2001; 7:00 pm, ESPN2		at No. 12 Wisconsin	L 46–49	9–6 (0–1)	19 – Haston	10 – Haston	3 – Jefferies	Kohl Center (17,142); Madison, Wisconsin
January 7, 2001; 4:00 pm, CBS		No. 1 Michigan State	W 59–58	10–6 (1–1)	27 – Haston	8 – Jefferies	4 – Tied	Assembly Hall (17,128); Bloomington, Indiana
January 9, 2001; 7:00 pm, ESPN		at Michigan	L 64–70	10–7 (1–2)	15 – Jefferies	9 – Haston	4 – Fife	Crisler Arena (10,871); Ann Arbor, Michigan
January 17, 2001; 6:00 pm, ESPN Plus		Penn State	W 77–69	11–7 (2–2)	22 – Haston	17 – Jefferies	5 – Jefferies	Assembly Hall (17,054); Bloomington, Indiana
January 20, 2001; 12:17 pm, ESPN Plus		at Minnesota	L 74–78 ^{OT}	11–8 (2–3)	17 – Haston	11 – Haston	5 – Coverdale	Williams Arena (13,120); Minneapolis
January 23, 2001; 7:00 pm, ESPN		Purdue; Rivalry/Crimson and Gold Cup	W 66–55	12–8 (3–3)	24 – Haston	15 – Haston	4 – Fife	Assembly Hall (17,288); Bloomington, Indiana
January 27, 2001; 1:00 pm, CBS		at Iowa	L 66–71	12–9 (3–4)	12 – Tied	13 – Haston	6 – Coverdale	Carver–Hawkeye Arena (15,500); Iowa City, Iowa
January 31, 2001; 8:00 pm, ESPN Plus		at Ohio State	W 70–67	13–9 (4–4)	18 – Tied	8 – Jefferies	5 – Fife	Value City Arena (19,200); Columbus, Ohio
February 3, 2001; 4:37 pm, ESPN Plus		at Penn State	W 85–78 ^{OT}	14–9 (5–4)	29 – Haston	14 – Jefferies	4 – Tied	Bryce Jordan Center (15,232); University Park, Pennsylvania
February 11, 2001; 1:00 pm, CBS		Michigan	W 72–59	15–9 (6–4)	30 – Haston	12 – Jefferies	6 – Coverdale	Assembly Hall (16,859); Bloomington, Indiana
February 14, 2001; 8:00 pm, ESPN Plus		Northwestern	W 78–54	16–9 (7–4)	19 – Haston	13 – Haston	4 – Tied	Assembly Hall (16,430); Bloomington, Indiana
February 17, 2001; 4:37 pm, ESPN Plus		No. 4 Illinois; Rivalry	L 61–67	16–10 (7–5)	18 – Haston	9 – Jefferies	3 – Coverdale	Assembly Hall (17,460); Bloomington, Indiana
February 20, 2001; 7:00 pm, ESPN		at No. 5 Michigan State	L 57–66	16–11 (7–6)	18 – Haston	5 – Jefferies	6 – Coverdale	Breslin Center (14,759); East Lansing, Michigan
February 24, 2001; 1:00 pm, CBS		Wisconsin	W 85–55	17–11 (8–6)	24 – Coverdale	5 – Jefferies	8 – Coverdale	Assembly Hall (17,051); Bloomington, Indiana
February 28, 2001; 8:00 pm, ESPN Plus		Minnesota	W 89–53	18–11 (9–6)	21 – Haston	14 – Haston	6 – Coverdale	Assembly Hall (17,187); Bloomington, Indiana
March 3, 2001; 8:00 pm, ESPN Plus		Purdue; Rivalry/Crimson and Gold Cup	W 74–58	19–11 (10–6)	22 – Haston	15 – Haston	6 – Coverdale	Mackey Arena (14,123); West Lafayette, Indiana
Big Ten tournament
March 9, 2001; 12:30 pm, ESPN2	(4)	vs. (5) Wisconsin; Quarterfinals	W 64–52	20–11	19 – Haston	9 – Newton	5 – Tied	United Center (22,679); Chicago
March 10, 2001; 2:30 pm, CBS	(4)	vs. (1) No. 4 Illinois; Semifinals	W 58–56	21–11	17 – Coverdale	7 – Tied	5 – Tied	United Center (23,418); Chicago
March 11, 2001; 3:30 pm, CBS	(4)	vs. (6) Iowa; Championship	L 61–63	21–12	24 – Haston	12 – Haston	5 – Coverdale	United Center (22,081); Chicago
NCAA tournament
March 15, 2001*; 7:55 pm, CBS	(4 W) No. 20	vs. (13 W) Kent State; First Round	L 73–77	21–13	29 – Haston	9 – Haston	4 – Tied	Cox Arena (9,697); San Diego
*Non-conference game. ^{#}Rankings from AP Poll. (#) Tournament seedings in parentheses. W=West. All times are in Eastern Time.
