= 2000–01 Iowa Hawkeyes men's basketball team =

American college basketball season

2000–01 Iowa Hawkeyes men's basketball

Big Ten tournament champions

NCAA tournament, second round
- Conference: Big Ten Conference

Ranking
- Coaches: No. 25
- AP: No. 24
- Record: 23–12 (7–9 Big Ten)
- Head coach: Steve Alford (2nd season)
- Assistant coaches: Brian Jones; Greg Lansing; Sam Alford
- MVP: Reggie Evans
- Captain: Dean Oliver
- Home arena: Carver-Hawkeye Arena

2000–01 Big Ten Conference men's basketball standings
	Conf.				Overall
Team	W		L	PCT	W		L	PCT
No. 4 Illinois	13	–	3	.813	27	–	8	.771
No. 3 Michigan State	13	–	3	.813	28	–	5	.848
No. 20 Indiana	10	–	6	.625	21	–	13	.618
No. 25 Wisconsin	9	–	7	.563	18	–	11	.621
No. 24 Iowa †	7	–	9	.438	23	–	12	.657
Penn State	7	–	9	.438	21	–	12	.636
Purdue	6	–	10	.375	17	–	15	.531
Minnesota	5	–	11	.313	18	–	14	.563
Michigan	4	–	12	.250	10	–	18	.357
Northwestern	3	–	13	.188	11	–	19	.367
Ohio State*	0	–	0	–	0	–	0	–
† 2001 Big Ten tournament winner Rankings from AP poll *Ohio State: 30 reg. season games; 1 NCAA Tourn. game vacated due to sanctions against the program Disputed record: Ohio State-(20-11)(11-5)

The 2000–01 Iowa Hawkeyes men's basketball team represented the University of Iowa as members of the Big Ten Conference. The team was led by second-year head coach Steve Alford and played their home games at Carver-Hawkeye Arena. They finished the season 23–12 overall and 7–9 in Big Ten play. The Hawkeyes won the Big Ten tournament to receive an automatic bid to the NCAA tournament as #7 seed in the East Region. After defeating Creighton, the Hawkeyes fell to the Kentucky Wildcats in the second round.

== Roster ==
2000–01 Iowa Hawkeyes men's basketball team
Players
Coaches

Pos.	#	Name	Height	Weight	Year	Hometown
G	2	Ryan Hogan	6 ft 4 in (1.93 m)	—	Jr	Deerfield, Illinois
F	4	Glen Worley	6 ft 7 in (2.01 m)	—	Fr	Coralville, Iowa
C	5	Jared Reiner	6 ft 11 in (2.11 m)	—	Fr	Tripp, South Dakota
G	11	Brody Boyd	5 ft 11 in (1.8 m)	—	Fr	Dugger, Indiana
G	20	Dean Oliver	5 ft 11 in (1.8 m)	—	Sr	Mason City, Iowa
F	23	Duez Henderson	6 ft 7 in (2.01 m)	—	Jr	Detroit, Michigan
G	24	Luke Recker	6 ft 6 in (1.98 m)	—	Jr	Auburn, Indiana
F	25	Rod Thompson	6 ft 6 in (1.98 m)	—	Fr	Galesburg, Illinois
G	30	Kyle Galloway	6 ft 6 in (1.98 m)	—	RS Jr	Sioux City, Iowa
F	32	Reggie Evans	6 ft 8 in (2.03 m)	—	Jr	Pensacola, Florida
G	43	Jason Smith	6 ft 3 in (1.91 m)	—	Jr
F	52	Cortney Scott	6 ft 6 in (1.98 m)	—	Fr	Jackson, Michigan
C	53	Sean Sonderleiter	6 ft 9 in (2.06 m)	—	Fr	Des Moines, Iowa

Head coach

- Steve Alford (Indiana)

Assistant coach(es)

- Brian Jones (Northern Iowa)
- Greg Lansing (South Dakota)
- Sam Alford

Legend

- (C) Team captain
- (S) Suspended
- (I) Ineligible
- (W) Walk-on
- Injured
- Current redshirt

== Schedule ==
Date time, TV	Rank^{#}	Opponent^{#}	Result	Record	High points	High rebounds	High assists	Site (attendance) city, state
Regular season
November 19, 2000*; 7:00 pm		Milwaukee	W 83–79	1–0	17 – Recker	12 – Evans	9 – Oliver	Carver-Hawkeye Arena (15,500); Iowa City, IA
November 21, 2000*; 7:00 pm		at Drake; Iowa Big Four	W 73–71	2–0	26 – Recker	15 – Evans	3 – Oliver	Knapp Center (7,112); Des Moines, IA
November 28, 2000*; 8:30 pm, ESPN2		Georgia Tech; ACC–Big Ten Challenge	W 85–67	3–0	21 – Recker	15 – Evans	4 – Recker	Carver-Hawkeye Arena (15,500); Iowa City, IA
December 1, 2000*; 8:11 pm		Chattanooga; Hawkeye Challenge	W 79–60	4–0	27 – Evans	12 – Evans	6 – Oliver	Carver-Hawkeye Arena (15,500); Iowa City, IA
December 2, 2000*; 8:11 pm		Tulsa; Hawkeye Challenge	W 66–65	5–0	20 – Evans	14 – Evans	4 – Hogan	Carver-Hawkeye Arena; Iowa City, IA
December 5, 2000*; 7:00 pm		Northern Iowa; Iowa Big Four	W 74–42	6–0	22 – Recker	11 – Evans	6 – Boyd	Carver-Hawkeye Arena (15,500); Iowa City, IA
December 9, 2000*; 7:00 pm		No. 25 Iowa State; Rivalry	W 80–68	7–0	28 – Recker	13 – Evans	4 – Recker	Carver-Hawkeye Arena (15,500); Iowa City, IA
December 16, 2000*; 6:00 pm, ESPN	No. 22	Missouri	W 99–94 ^{2OT}	8–0	23 – Recker	13 – Evans	4 – Recker	Carver-Hawkeye Arena (15,500); Iowa City, IA
December 19, 2000*; 7:00 pm	No. 19	Centenary	W 72–52	9–0	16 – Oliver	10 – Evans	4 – Tied	Carver-Hawkeye Arena (15,500); Iowa City, IA
December 23, 2000*; 5:00 pm	No. 19	at Kansas State	L 78–86	9–1	25 – Recker	18 – Evans	4 – Oliver	Bramlage Coliseum; Manhattan, KS
December 28, 2000*; 9:07 pm	No. 23	vs. Detroit; Rainbow Classic	W 69–68	10–1	18 – Oliver	9 – Evans	4 – Oliver	Stan Sheriff Center; Honolulu, HI
December 29, 2000*; 9:00 pm	No. 23	vs. No. 6 Tennessee; Rainbow Classic	L 68–80	10–2	19 – Evans	10 – Evans	6 – Oliver	Stan Sheriff Center; Honolulu, HI
December 30, 2000*; 9:00 pm	No. 23	vs. Saint Louis; Rainbow Classic	W 68–56	11–2	19 – Evans	10 – Evans	6 – Oliver	Stan Sheriff Center; Honolulu, HI
January 6, 2001; 11:17 am, ESPN Plus		at Penn State	W 86–85	12–2 (1–0)	20 – Recker	8 – Evans	6 – Recker	Bryce Jordan Center (9,591); University Park, PA
January 11, 2001; 6:30 am, ESPN2		No. 7 Illinois	W 78–62	13–2 (2–0)	27 – Recker	15 – Evans	3 – Tied	Carver-Hawkeye Arena (15,500); Iowa City, IA
January 13, 2001; 1:30 pm, ESPN Plus		at Purdue	W 83–73	14–2 (3–0)	19 – Oliver	18 – Evans	8 – Oliver	Mackey Arena (14,123); West Lafayette, IN
January 16, 2001; 6:00 pm, ESPN	No. 14	at No. 19 Wisconsin	L 54–67	14–3 (3–1)	10 – Evans	9 – Evans	3 – Tied	Kohl Center (17,142); Madison, WI
January 20, 2001; 7:00 pm, ESPN Plus	No. 14	Michigan	L 69–70	14–4 (3–2)	22 – Evans	10 – Evans	6 – Oliver	Carver-Hawkeye Arena (15,500); Iowa City, IA
January 24, 2001; 7:00 pm, ESPN Plus	No. 21	at Minnesota	W 87–74	15–4 (4–2)	25 – Evans	10 – Evans	7 – Oliver	Williams Arena (14,523); Minneapolis, MN
January 27, 2001; 12:00 pm, CBS	No. 21	Indiana	W 71–66	16–4 (5–2)	27 – Recker	9 – Worley	5 – Oliver	Carver-Hawkeye Arena (15,500); Iowa City, IA
January 31, 2001; 7:00 pm, ESPN Plus	No. 18	Minnesota	W 64–55	17–4 (6–2)	19 – Evans	15 – Evans	4 – Oliver	Carver-Hawkeye Arena (15,500); Iowa City, IA
February 7, 2001; 7:00 pm, ESPN Plus	No. 14	Ohio State	L 68–69	17–5 (6–3)	27 – Oliver	11 – Evans	5 – Oliver	Carver-Hawkeye Arena (15,500); Iowa City, IA
February 10, 2001; 1:30 pm, ESPN Plus	No. 14	at Northwestern	L 61–69	17–6 (6–4)	20 – Oliver	14 – Evans	6 – Oliver	Welsh-Ryan Arena (7,887); Evanston, IL
February 14, 2001; 7:00 pm, ESPN Plus	No. 25	at Michigan	L 85–95	17–7 (6–5)	26 – Oliver	9 – Evans	4 – Oliver	Crisler Arena (9,949); Ann Arbor, MI
February 18, 2001; 3:00 pm, CBS	No. 25	at No. 5 Michigan State	L 70–94	17–8 (6–6)	14 – Oliver	9 – Evans	3 – Oliver	Breslin Center (14,759); East Lansing, MI
February 21, 2001; 7:00 pm, ESPN Plus		Purdue	W 78–72 ^{OT}	18–8 (7–6)	20 – Evans	16 – Evans	11 – Oliver	Carver-Hawkeye Arena (15,500); Iowa City, IA
February 24, 2001; 4:00 pm, ESPN Plus		at No. 3 Illinois	L 63–89	18–9 (7–7)	19 – Oliver	11 – Evans	4 – Oliver	Assembly Hall (16,683); Champaign, IL
March 1, 2001; 6:00 pm, ESPN		Penn State	L 73–78	18–10 (7–8)	19 – Boyd	16 – Evans	7 – Oliver	Carver-Hawkeye Arena (15,500); Iowa City, IA
March 3, 2001; 1:30 pm, ESPN Plus		No. 22 Wisconsin	L 57–59	18–11 (7–9)	18 – Oliver	7 – Worley	6 – Oliver	Carver-Hawkeye Arena (15,500); Iowa City, IA
Big Ten tournament
March 8, 2001*; 7:00 pm, ESPN Plus	(6)	vs. (11) Northwestern; First Round	W 72–55	19–11	20 – Evans	14 – Evans	7 – Boyd	United Center (20,003); Chicago, IL
March 9, 2001*; 9:00 pm, ESPN2	(6)	vs. (3) No. 24 Ohio State; Quarterfinals	W 75–66	20–11	18 – Worley	8 – Evans	6 – Oliver	United Center (21,739); Chicago, IL
March 10, 2001*; 4:00 pm, CBS	(6)	vs. (7) Penn State; Semifinals	W 94–74	21–11	30 – Evans	18 – Evans	8 – Oliver	United Center (23,418); Chicago, IL
March 11, 2001*; 2:30 pm, CBS	(6)	vs. (4) Indiana; Championship Game	W 63–61	22–11	22 – Boyd	11 – Evans	3 – Tied	United Center (22,081); Chicago, IL
NCAA tournament
March 15, 2001*; 1:50 pm, CBS	(7 E) No. 24	vs. (10 E) Creighton; First Round	W 69–56	23–11	19 – Evans	7 – Evans	4 – Oliver	Nassau Veterans Memorial Coliseum (9,086); Uniondale, NY
March 17, 2001*; 7:15 pm, CBS	(7 E) No. 24	vs. (2 E) No. 9 Kentucky; Second Round	L 79–92	23–12	26 – Oliver	13 – Evans	4 – Tied	Nassau Veterans Memorial Coliseum (14,959); Uniondale, NY
*Non-conference game. ^{#}Rankings from AP Poll. (#) Tournament seedings in parentheses. E=East. All times are in Central Time.

- Source: Schedule
