= 2000–01 Illinois Fighting Illini men's basketball team =

American college basketball season

2000–01 Illinois Fighting Illini men's basketball

Big Ten Regular Season Co-Champions

NCAA tournament, Elite Eight
- Conference: Big Ten Conference

Ranking
- Coaches: No. 6
- AP: No. 4
- Record: 27–8 (13–3 Big Ten)
- Head coach: Bill Self (1st season)
- Assistant coaches: Rob Judson (5th season); Norm Roberts (1st season); Billy Gillispie (1st season)
- MVP: Frank Williams
- Captains: Sergio McClain; Marcus Griffin
- Home arena: Assembly Hall

2000–01 Big Ten Conference men's basketball standings
	Conf.				Overall
Team	W		L	PCT	W		L	PCT
No. 4 Illinois	13	–	3	.813	27	–	8	.771
No. 3 Michigan State	13	–	3	.813	28	–	5	.848
No. 20 Indiana	10	–	6	.625	21	–	13	.618
No. 25 Wisconsin	9	–	7	.563	18	–	11	.621
No. 24 Iowa †	7	–	9	.438	23	–	12	.657
Penn State	7	–	9	.438	21	–	12	.636
Purdue	6	–	10	.375	17	–	15	.531
Minnesota	5	–	11	.313	18	–	14	.563
Michigan	4	–	12	.250	10	–	18	.357
Northwestern	3	–	13	.188	11	–	19	.367
Ohio State*	0	–	0	–	0	–	0	–
† 2001 Big Ten tournament winner Rankings from AP poll *Ohio State: 30 reg. season games; 1 NCAA Tourn. game vacated due to sanctions against the program Disputed record: Ohio State-(20-11)(11-5)

The 2000–01 Illinois Fighting Illini men's basketball team represented the University of Illinois at Urbana–Champaign in the 2000–01 NCAA Division I men's basketball season. Led by first year head coach Bill Self, the Illini played their home games at Assembly Hall in Champaign, Illinois and were members of the Big Ten Conference. They finished the season with a record of 27–8, 13–3 in Big Ten play to win a share of the Big Ten regular season title with Michigan State. They lost in the semifinals of the Big Ten tournament to Indiana. They received an at-large bid to the NCAA tournament as the No. 1 seed in the Midwest Region. They advanced to the Elite Eight before losing to Arizona.

== Regular season ==
In May 2000, Lon Kruger left Illinois to become head coach of the NBA’s Atlanta Hawks. Bill Self was named Illinois' 15th head men's basketball coach on June 9, 2000. Self came to Illinois from Tulsa where he had led the Golden Hurricane to consecutive NCAA tournament appearances, including a 32–5 record and Tournament run to the Elite Eight in 2000. Self ’s first season at Illinois was memorable. The Illini were ranked in the Top 10 the entire season and tied for the Big Ten Championship with Michigan State. The Illini defeated Purdue in the quarterfinals of the Big Ten tournament but fell to Indiana in the semifinals.

The Illini received an at-large as a No. 1 seed in the Midwest Region of the NCAA Tournament. Easy wins over Northwestern State and Charlotte led to a trip to the Sweet Sixteen. The Illini defeated Kansas in the Sweet Sixteen to advance to the Elite Eight. However, the Illini run ended in the Elite Eight to eventual national runner-up Arizona, the third meeting between the two schools on the season. Sophomore Frank Williams became the first Illini player to earn Big Ten Player of the Year honors since 1967 and was named to several postseason All-America squads. Junior Cory Bradford set an NCAA record by making a three-point field goal in 88 consecutive games.

=== Roster ===
2000–01 Illinois Fighting Illini men's basketball team
Players
Coaches

Pos.	#	Name	Height	Weight	Year	Previous school	Hometown
G	00	Brett Melton	6 ft 5 in (1.96 m)	195 lb (88 kg)	Fr	Mahomet-Seymour High School	Mahomet, Illinois
G	5	Nate Mast	5 ft 11 in (1.8 m)	170 lb (77 kg)	Sr	Champaign Central High School	Champaign, Illinois
G	12	Joe Cross	6 ft 2 in (1.88 m)	200 lb (91 kg)	Sr	Carbondale Community High School	Carbondale, Illinois
G	13	Cory Bradford	6 ft 3 in (1.91 m)	200 lb (91 kg)	RS Jr	Raleigh Egypt High School	Memphis, Tennessee
F/C	21	Robert Archibald	6 ft 11 in (2.11 m)	250 lb (113 kg)	Jr	Lafayette High School	Ballwin, Missouri
F	22	Lucas Johnson	6 ft 8 in (2.03 m)	230 lb (104 kg)	Jr	Maine West High School	Des Plaines, Illinois
G	24	Sean Harrington	6 ft 3 in (1.91 m)	185 lb (84 kg)	So	Elgin High School	Bartlett, Illinois
G	25	Jerrance Howard	6 ft 1 in (1.85 m)	190 lb (86 kg)	RS Fr	Peoria High School	Peoria, Illinois
G	30	Frank Williams	6 ft 3 in (1.91 m)	212 lb (96 kg)	RS So	Manual High School	Peoria, Illinois
F	33	Damir Krupalija	6 ft 9 in (2.06 m)	230 lb (104 kg)	Jr	Rockford Boylan High School	Rockford, Illinois
F	34	Brian Cook	6 ft 10 in (2.08 m)	240 lb (109 kg)	So	Lincoln Community High School	Lincoln, Illinois
F	40	Sergio McClain (C)	6 ft 4 in (1.93 m)	230 lb (104 kg)	Sr	Manual High School	Peoria, Illinois
F	42	Clayton Thomas (W)	6 ft 6 in (1.98 m)	220 lb (100 kg)	So	Larkin High School	Elgin, Illinois
C	45	Nick Smith (redshirt)	7 ft 2 in (2.18 m)	240 lb (109 kg)	Fr	Bloomingdale High School	Valrico, Florida
F	52	Marcus Griffin (C)	6 ft 9 in (2.06 m)	235 lb (107 kg)	Sr	Manual High School/Lincoln College	Peoria, Illinois

Head coach

- Bill Self (Oklahoma State) (1st year)

Assistant coach(es)

- Rob Judson (University of Illinois) (5th year)
- Billy Gillispie (Southwest Texas State) (1st year)
- Norm Roberts (Queens College) (1st year)

Legend

- (C) Team captain
- (S) Suspended
- (I) Ineligible
- (W) Walk-on
- Injured
- Current redshirt

Roster

== Schedule and results ==
Date time, TV	Rank^{#}	Opponent^{#}	Result	Record	Site (attendance) city, state
Exhibition
Nov 6, 2000*; 6:40 pm		Athletes in Action	W 91–56		Assembly Hall; Champaign, IL
Nov 10, 2000*; 7:00 pm		NBC Thunder	W 76–57		Assembly Hall; Champaign, IL
Non-conference regular season
11/17/2000*	No. 8	Maine	W 86–57	1–0	Assembly Hall (13,044); Champaign, IL
11/20/2000*	No. 8	vs. UNLV; Maui Invitational Tournament	W 74–69	2–0	Lahaina Civic Center (2,500); Lahaina, HI
11/21/2000*	No. 8	vs. No. 6 Maryland; Maui Invitational Tournament	W 90–80	3–0	Lahaina Civic Center (2,500); Lahaina, HI
11/22/2000*	No. 8	vs. No. 1 Arizona; Maui Invitational Tournament Championship	L 76–79	3–1	Lahaina Civic Center (2,500); Lahaina, HI
11/26/2000*	No. 8	Texas Southern	W 86–67	4–1	Assembly Hall (12,970); Champaign, IL
11/28/2000*	No. 9	vs. No. 1 Duke; Big Ten-ACC Challenge	L 77–78	4–2	Greensboro Coliseum (17,966); Greensboro, NC
12/2/2000*	No. 9	at Kansas State	W 76–56	5–2	Bramlage Coliseum (6,415); Manhattan, KS
12/6/2000*	No. 9	Wisconsin-Milwaukee	W 85–44	6–2	Assembly Hall (12,312); Champaign, IL
12/9/2000*; 2:00, CBS	No. 9	No. 7 Seton Hall	W 87–79	7–2	Assembly Hall (16,683); Champaign, IL
12/16/2000*	No. 5	vs. No. 7 Arizona	W 81–73	8–2	United Center (21,885); Chicago, IL
12/21/2000*	No. 5	vs. Missouri; Braggin' Rights	W 86–81 ^{OT}	9–2	Scottrade Center (22,089); St. Louis, MO
12/23/2000*	No. 5	at Texas	L 64–72	9–3	Frank Erwin Center (11,916); Austin, TX
12/29/2000*	No. 9	vs. Illinois-Chicago	W 77–64	10–3	Rosemont Horizon (9,152); Rosemont, IL
Big Ten regular season
1/3/2001	No. 9	Minnesota	W 80–64	11–3 (1–0)	Assembly Hall (13,840); Champaign, IL
1/6/2001	No. 9	Ohio State	W 83–68	12–3 (2–0)	Assembly Hall (16,683); Champaign, IL
1/11/2001	No. 7	at Iowa; Rivalry	L 62–78	12–4 (2–1)	Carver–Hawkeye Arena (15,500); Iowa City, IA
1/13/2001	No. 7	Michigan	W 80–51	13–4 (3–1)	Assembly Hall (16,683); Champaign, IL
1/17/2001	No. 11	at Northwestern; Rivalry	W 63–49	14–4 (4–1)	Welsh-Ryan Arena (8,117); Evanston, IL
1/20/2001	No. 11	Penn State	W 92–60	15–4 (5–1)	Assembly Hall (16,683); Champaign, IL
1/25/2001	No. 7	at Michigan	W 55–51	16–4 (6–1)	Crisler Arena (11,092); Ann Arbor, MI
1/31/2001	No. 6	at Penn State	L 95–98 ^{OT}	16–5 (6–2)	Bryce Jordan Center (8,953); University Park, PA
2/3/2001	No. 6	Northwestern; Rivalry	W 84–59	17–5 (7–2)	Assembly Hall (16,683); Champaign, IL
2/6/2001	No. 7	No. 4 Michigan State	W 77–66	18–5 (8–2)	Assembly Hall (16,683); Champaign, IL
2/10/2001	No. 7	at Purdue	W 82–61	19–5 (9–2)	Mackey Arena (14,123); West Lafayette, IN
2/13/2001	No. 4	No. 19 Wisconsin	W 68–67	20–5 (10–2)	Assembly Hall (16,683); Champaign, IL
2/17/2001	No. 4	at Indiana; Rivalry	W 67–61	21–5 (11–2)	Assembly Hall (17,460); Bloomington, IN
2/22/2001	No. 3	at Ohio State	L 61–63	21–6 (11–3)	Value City Arena (19,200); Columbus, OH
2/24/2001	No. 3	Iowa; Rivalry	W 89–63	22–6 (12–3)	Assembly Hall (16,683); Champaign, IL
3/4/2001; 4:00, CBS	No. 5	at Minnesota	W 67–59	23–6 (13–3)	Williams Arena (14,329); Minneapolis, MN
Big Ten tournament
3/9/2001	(1) No. 4	vs. (8) Purdue quarterfinals	W 83–66	24–6	United Center (22,679); Chicago, IL
3/10/2001; CBS	(1) No. 4	vs. (4) Indiana semifinals	L 56–58	24–7	United Center (23,418); Chicago, IL
NCAA tournament
3/16/2001*; CBS	(1 MW) No. 4	vs. (16 MW) Northwestern State; First Round	W 96–54	25–7	University of Dayton Arena (13,007); Dayton, OH
3/18/2001*; CBS	(1 MW) No. 4	vs. (9 MW) Charlotte; Second Round	W 79–61	26–7	University of Dayton Arena (13,159); Dayton, OH
3/23/2001*; CBS	(1 MW) No. 4	vs. (4 MW) No. 12 Kansas; Sweet Sixteen	W 80–64	27–7	Alamodome (28,962); San Antonio, TX
3/25/2001*; CBS	(1 MW) No. 4	vs. (2 MW) No. 5 Arizona; Elite Eight	L 81–87	27–8	Alamodome (30,212); San Antonio, TX
*Non-conference game. ^{#}Rankings from AP Poll. (#) Tournament seedings in parentheses. All times are in Central Time.

== Player stats ==
Player	Games Played	2 pt. Field Goals	3 pt. Field Goals	Free Throws	Rebounds	Assists	Blocks	Steals	Points
Frank Williams	34	129	39	133	126	148	9	67	508
Brian Cook	35	119	28	69	212	43	45	21	391
Marcus Griffin	34	154	0	77	203	34	44	29	385
Cory Bradford	35	41	72	47	89	63	3	23	345
Sergio McClain	35	69	18	69	194	102	7	46	261
Robert Archibald	34	77	0	90	154	22	26	12	244
Sean Harrington	35	10	51	27	49	41	1	27	200
Lucas Johnson	35	30	18	62	116	59	5	20	176
Damir Krupalija	27	36	7	36	105	18	4	16	129
Brett Melton	28	7	8	5	23	7	1	3	43
Joe Cross	17	5	2	2	12	1	0	4	18
Nate Mast	20	1	4	1	12	2	0	1	15
Jerrance Howard	25	4	0	2	9	10	1	0	10

== Awards and honors ==
- Frank Williams
  - Big Ten Player of the Year
  - Chicago Tribune Silver Basketball award
  - Wooden 1st team All-American
  - National Association of Basketball Coaches 2nd team All-American
  - Associated Press 3rd team All-American
  - Team Most Valuable Player
  - Fighting Illini All-Century team (2005)
- Brian Cook
  - Fighting Illini All-Century team (2005)
- Cory Bradford
  - Associated Press Honorable Mention All-American

== Rankings ==
Ranking movement Legend: ██ Increase in ranking. ██ Decrease in ranking. (RV) Received votes but unranked. (NR) Not ranked.
Poll	Pre	Wk 2	Wk 3	Wk 4	Wk 5	Wk 6	Wk 7	Wk 8	Wk 9	Wk 10	Wk 11	Wk 12	Wk 13	Wk 14	Wk 15	Wk 16	Wk 17	Final
AP	8	8	8	9	9	5	9	9	7	11	7	6	7	4	3	5	4	4
