= 2000–01 Penn State Nittany Lions basketball team =

American college basketball season

2000–01 Penn State Nittany Lions basketball

NCAA tournament, Sweet Sixteen
- Conference: Big Ten Conference
- Record: 21–12 (7–9 Big Ten)
- Head coach: Jerry Dunn (6th season)
- Home arena: Bryce Jordan Center

2000–01 Big Ten Conference men's basketball standings
	Conf.				Overall
Team	W		L	PCT	W		L	PCT
No. 4 Illinois	13	–	3	.813	27	–	8	.771
No. 3 Michigan State	13	–	3	.813	28	–	5	.848
No. 20 Indiana	10	–	6	.625	21	–	13	.618
No. 25 Wisconsin	9	–	7	.563	18	–	11	.621
No. 24 Iowa †	7	–	9	.438	23	–	12	.657
Penn State	7	–	9	.438	21	–	12	.636
Purdue	6	–	10	.375	17	–	15	.531
Minnesota	5	–	11	.313	18	–	14	.563
Michigan	4	–	12	.250	10	–	18	.357
Northwestern	3	–	13	.188	11	–	19	.367
Ohio State*	0	–	0	–	0	–	0	–
† 2001 Big Ten tournament winner Rankings from AP poll *Ohio State: 30 reg. season games; 1 NCAA Tourn. game vacated due to sanctions against the program Disputed record: Ohio State-(20-11)(11-5)

The 2000–01 Penn State Nittany Lions basketball team represented Pennsylvania State University in the 2000–01 NCAA Division I men's basketball season. They were led by head coach Jerry Dunn, in his sixth season with the team, and played their home games at the Bryce Jordan Center in University Park, Pennsylvania as members of the Big Ten Conference. The Lions finished the season 21–12, 7–9 in Big Ten play to finish in a two-way tie for 6th place. They defeated Michigan and Michigan State before losing to Iowa in the semifinals of the Big Ten tournament. They received a bid to the 2001 NCAA Division I men's basketball tournament where they defeated Providence and North Carolina before losing to Temple in the Sweet 16.

== Roster ==
2000–01 Penn State Nittany Lions men's basketball team
Players
Coaches

Pos.	#	Name	Height	Weight	Year	Hometown
F	1	Jamaal Tate	6 ft 5 in (1.96 m)	—	Fr
G	3	Joe Crispin	6 ft 0 in (1.83 m)	—	Sr	Pitman, New Jersey
G	4	Ken Krimmel	6 ft 2 in (1.88 m)	—	Jr
G	5	Jon Crispin	6 ft 1 in (1.85 m)	—	So
F	23	Gyasi Cline-Heard	6 ft 7 in (2.01 m)	—	Sr
G	33	Titus Ivory	6 ft 4 in (1.93 m)	—	RS Sr

Head coach

- Jerry Dunn

Assistant coach(es)

Legend

- (C) Team captain
- (S) Suspended
- (I) Ineligible
- (W) Walk-on
- Injured
- Current redshirt

Roster

== Schedule ==
Date time, TV	Rank^{#}	Opponent^{#}	Result	Record	Site city, state
November 22*		Loyola (MD)	W 87–58	1–0	Bryce Jordan Center; University Park, Pennsylvania
November 25*		at Kentucky	W 73–68	2–0	Rupp Arena; Lexington, Kentucky
November 29*		at North Carolina State	L 76–84	2–1	RBC Center; Raleigh, NC
December 2*		Penn	W 84–74	3–1	Bryce Jordan Center; University Park, Pennsylvania
December 6*		Pittsburgh	W 88–74	4–1	Bryce Jordan Center; University Park, Pennsylvania
December 9*		Temple	W 66–60	5–1	Bryce Jordan Center; University Park, Pennsylvania
December 18*		Wagner	W 100–91	6–1	Bryce Jordan Center; University Park, Pennsylvania
December 22*		Bucknell	W 82–72	7–1	Bryce Jordan Center; University Park, Pennsylvania
December 26*		vs. Princeton	W 65–52	8–1	Madison Square Garden; New York City, NY
December 27*		vs. Hofstra	W 74–71	9–1	Madison Square Garden; New York City, NY
January 3		vs. No. 1 Michigan State	L 73–98	9–2 (0–1)	Breslin Student Events Center; East Lansing, Michigan
January 6		Iowa	L 85–86	9–3 (0–2)	Bryce Jordan Center; University Park, Pennsylvania
January 10		at Ohio State	W 78–75	10–3 (1–2)	Value City Arena; Columbus, Ohio
January 13		Northwestern	W 73–66	11–3 (2–2)	Bryce Jordan Center; University Park, Pennsylvania
January 17		at Indiana	L 69–77	11–4 (2–3)	Assembly Hall; Bloomington, Indiana
January 20		at No. 11 Illinois	L 60–92	11–5 (2–4)	Assembly Hall; Champaign, Illinois
January 23*		at Yale	W 90–75	12–5 (2–4)	Payne Whitney Gymnasium; New Haven, CT
January 27		at No. 15 Wisconsin	L 58–63	12–6 (2–5)	Kohl Center; Madison, WI
January 31		No. 6 Illinois	W 98–95 ^{OT}	13–6 (3–5)	Bryce Jordan Center; University Park, Pennsylvania
February 3		Indiana	L 78–85 ^{OT}	13–7 (3–6)	Bryce Jordan Center; University Park, Pennsylvania
February 7		Michigan	W 77–66	14–7 (4–6)	Bryce Jordan Center; University Park, Pennsylvania
February 14		at Minnesota	W 82–62	15–7 (5–6)	Williams Arena; Minneapolis, Minnesota
February 17		Purdue	W 92–71	16–7 (6–6)	Bryce Jordan Center; University Park, Pennsylvania
February 21		at Northwestern	L 61–62	16–8 (6–7)	Welsh–Ryan Arena; Evanston, Illinois
February 24		Michigan State	L 57–76	16–9 (6–8)	Bryce Jordan Center; University Park, Pennsylvania
March 1		at Iowa	W 78–73	17–9 (7–8)	Carver–Hawkeye Arena; Iowa City, Iowa
March 3		Ohio State	L 87–93	17–10 (7–9)	Bryce Jordan Center; University Park, Pennsylvania
Big Ten tournament
March 8		vs. Michigan	W 82–80	18–10 (7–9)	United Center; Chicago, Illinois
March 9		vs. No. 2 Michigan State	W 65–63	19–10 (7–9)	United Center; Chicago, Illinois
March 10		vs. Iowa	L 74–94	19–11 (7–9)	United Center; Chicago, Illinois
2001 NCAA tournament
March 16*		vs. Providence	W 69–59	20–11 (7–9)	Louisiana Superdome; New Orleans, Louisiana
March 18*		vs. North Carolina	W 82–74	21–11 (7–9)	Louisiana Superdome; New Orleans, Louisiana
March 23*		vs. Temple; South Regional semifinal – Sweet Sixteen	L 72–84	21–12 (7–9)	Georgia Dome; Atlanta, Georgia
*Non-conference game. ^{#}Rankings from AP Poll. (#) Tournament seedings in parentheses.
