= Brad Soderberg =

American basketball player-coach

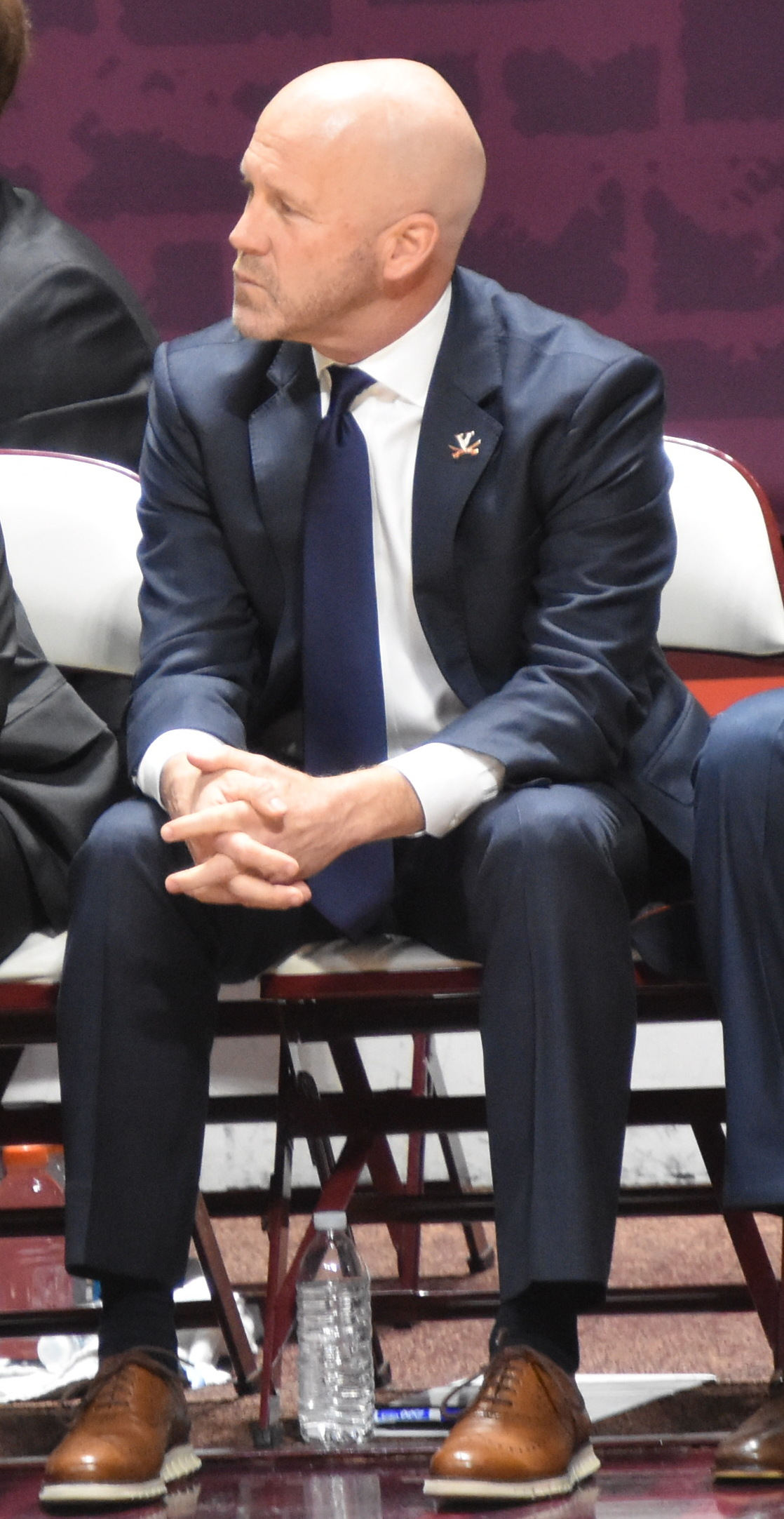

Current position
- Title: Assistant coach
- Team: Millikin Big Blue
- Conference: CCIW

Biographical details
- Born: May 10, 1962 (age 64); Wausau, Wisconsin, U.S.

Playing career
- 1982–1984: Wisconsin–Stevens Point
- Position: Guard

Coaching career (HC unless noted)
- 1984–1985: Wisconsin–Stevens Point (assistant)
- 1985–1986: Colorado State (GA)
- 1986–1987: Fort Hays State (assistant)
- 1987–1988: Loras (assistant)
- 1988–1993: Loras
- 1993–1995: South Dakota State
- 1995–2000: Wisconsin (assistant)
- 2000–2001: Wisconsin (interim HC)
- 2001–2002: Saint Louis (assistant)
- 2002–2007: Saint Louis
- 2009–2015: Lindenwood
- 2015–2025: Virginia (assistant)
- 2025–present: Millikin (assistant)

Head coaching record
- Overall: 338–204
- Tournaments: 0–1 (NCAA Division I); 1–2 (NIT); 1–1 NAIA Division I)

Accomplishments and honors

Championships
- HAAC regular season (2011)

Bradley William Soderberg (born May 10, 1962) is a men's college basketball coach. He is currently an assistant coach for the Millikin Big Blue of the College Conference of Illinois and Wisconsin (CCIW). Soderberg was previously head coach at Lindenwood, St. Louis, South Dakota State, Loras College, was the interim head coach at Wisconsin, and an assistant coach for the University of Virginia Cavaliers.

== Playing career ==
Born in Wausau, Wisconsin, Soderberg played basketball at Pacelli High School in Stevens Point, Wisconsin for his father, Wisconsin Basketball Coaches Hall of Fame Coach, Don Soderberg. Soderberg played basketball in college at Ripon College from 1980 to 1982 before he transferred to University of Wisconsin–Stevens Point, playing at Stevens Point from 1982 to 1984 under head coach Dick Bennett, and with Terry Porter (who later became player and eventually a head coach in the National Basketball Association). The 1984 team made it all the way to the championship game of the NAIA Tournament before falling 50–48 to Fort Hays State University. He graduated from the University of Wisconsin–Stevens Point in 1985 with a degree in physical education.

== Coaching career ==
=== Loras and South Dakota State ===
In 1986 Soderberg received his master's degree from Colorado State University in physical education. He was then hired as an assistant coach at Fort Hays State University for one season before quickly moving on to an assistant post at Loras College in Dubuque, Iowa. He became head coach of Loras in 1988 and served until 1993 compiling a record of 79–45. He was then hired as head coach of South Dakota State University where he stayed from 1993 to 1995 compiling a record of 36–18.

=== Wisconsin ===
After the two successful stints as a head coach at Division II schools, Soderberg's former coach, Dick Bennett, hired him as his assistant at the University of Wisconsin–Madison. He served as an assistant to Bennett through the 2000 season. Three games into the 2000–01 campaign, the Badgers (coming off a Final Four appearance in 2000) saw their head coach, Dick Bennett retire. Soderberg took over the heralded team and led them to a 16–10 record. However, the team lost in the first round of the NCAA tournament to Georgia State University, considered a major disappointment to many Badger fans. Soderberg was then let go from his head coach position at the end of the season, as the Badgers hired Bo Ryan.

=== Saint Louis ===
Soderberg accepted an assistant post at Saint Louis University under head coach Lorenzo Romar. After his first season Romar was hired away to become the head coach at the University of Washington. Brad Soderberg was promoted to head coach for the 2002–03 season. His first two seasons he led the Billikens to two NIT Tournament appearances. After his first three years SLU moved from Conference USA to the Atlantic 10. Soderberg was let go after three consecutive seasons without reaching the post season. He did however have a 20 win season during his final year at Saint Louis University. He was replaced by Rick Majerus.

On April 17, 2007 St. Louis sports station KFNS announced that Soderberg had been dismissed as men's basketball coach. No longer a head coach at a college, Soderberg coached his younger son's 4th grade team at St. Cletus in St. Charles, Missouri. On July 7, 2008, Soderberg was named Interim Director of Athletics at Loras College.

=== Lindenwood ===
On May 14, 2009, Soderberg was named head coach of Lindenwood University in Saint Charles, Missouri. In his first season as head coach of the Lions, Soderberg led the Lions to one of the best seasons in school history, a record of 23–10, setting a school record for most home wins in a season by going 13–1 at home. On March 29, 2010, the university announced the transfer of Kramer Soderberg, Missouri player of the year during his senior year of high school, from Miami University (Ohio) to join his father's program.

In his second season as head coach of the Lions, Lindenwood set a new school record for most straight wins after Defeating Missouri Valley 77–66 for the team's 12th straight win on January 6, 2011. The Lions finished the regular season 26–4 won the 2011 HAAC Regular Season Championship and earned an automatic bid to the 2011 NAIA Division I men's basketball tournament. The 26 wins set a new best record in school history. Soderberg led the Lions to their first NAIA Division I Tournament win when the 20th seeded Lions defeated 14th-seeded St. Catharine College 78–72. Lindenwood's defense held St. Catharine ten points below its season average and forced 13 turnovers in the game. Offensively, Lindenwood made 33 of 40 free throws. All three of Lindenwoods guards finished with double digit points, Kramer Soderberg finished with 27, Bazzell with 14 points, and Rose with 13. Soderberg's Lions eventually fell in the second round to 3rd-seeded Mountain State University, ending Lindenwood's final season in the NAIA and Heart of America Athletic Conference with the best record in school history with a 29–6 overall record.

In 2011, Lindenwood began the transition from the NAIA to the NCAA's Division II. Competing as an independent, Lindenwood finished the season with a 26–3 record and was invited to the NCAA's Division II Transitional Tournament in Spearfish, South Dakota. Soderberg led them to the Division II Transitional National champions by defeating Minot State and Sioux Falls to end the season with a final 28–3 record.

Lindenwood announced their entry into the Mid–America Intercollegiate Athletics Association (MIAA). Although ineligible for post-season play during the transition to Division II, Soderberg's Lions finished their first regular season in the MIAA in a third place tie in the fifteen team league.

=== Virginia ===
On April 17, 2015, Soderberg was named an assistant coach at Virginia, serving under Dick Bennett's son and former Wisconsin assistant, Tony Bennett. Soderberg had a job change in the spring of 2021, where he became the Director of Scouting instead of an assistant coach under Tony Bennett.

After Tony Bennett retired and Ron Sanchez was not retained, Soderberg left the staff with the hiring of Ryan Odom.

=== Millikin ===
On June 6, 2025, Soderberg was hired by Millikin, to serve as an assistant coach under his son, Kramer.

== Family ==
Soderberg and his wife, Linda, have a daughter, Daley, and two sons, Kramer and Davis. Kramer Soderberg was hired as the men's head basketball coach at Millikin University in 2021, having served as an assistant men's coach at Millikin beginning in 2015.

== Head coaching record ==
Record table
Season	Team	Overall	Conference	Standing	Postseason
Loras Duhawks (Iowa Intercollegiate Athletic Conference) (1988–1993)
1988–89	Loras	17–7	11–5	3rd	
1989–90	Loras	14–11	11–5	2nd	
1990–91	Loras	17–8	11–5	3rd	
1991–92	Loras	16–10	10–6	3rd	
1992–93	Loras	15–9	10–6	3rd	
Loras:		79–45 (.637)	53–27 (.663)		
South Dakota State Jackrabbits (North Central Conference) (1993–1995)
1993–94	South Dakota State	19–8	11–7	3rd	
1994–95	South Dakota State	17–10	10–8	6th	
South Dakota State:		36–18 (.667)	21–15 (.583)		
Wisconsin Badgers (Big Ten Conference) (2000–2001)
2000–01	Wisconsin	16–10	9–7	5th	NCAA Division I First Round
Wisconsin:		16–10 (.615)	9–7 (.563)		
Saint Louis Billikens (Conference USA) (2002–2005)
2002–03	Saint Louis	16–14	9–7	4th	NIT First Round
2003–04	Saint Louis	19–13	9–7	6th	NIT Second Round
2004–05	Saint Louis	9–21	6–10	10th	
Saint Louis Billikens (Atlantic 10 Conference) (2005–2007)
2005–06	Saint Louis	16–13	10–6	3rd	
2006–07	Saint Louis	20–13	8–8	7th	
Saint Louis:		80–74 (.519)	42–38 (.525)		
Lindenwood Lions (Heart of America Athletic Conference) (2009–2011)
2009–10	Lindenwood	23–10	13–7	4th	
2010–11	Lindenwood	29–6	17–3	T–1st	NAIA Division I Second Round
Lindenwood Lions (NCAA Division II independent) (2011–2012)
2011–12	Lindenwood	28–3			
Lindenwood Lions (Mid–America Intercollegiate Athletics Association) (2012–2015)
2012–13	Lindenwood	19–7	12–6	T–3rd	Ineligible during transition to NCAA Division II
2013–14	Lindenwood	11–19	6–13	11th	
2014–15	Lindenwood	17–12	12–7	4th	
Lindenwood:		127–57 (.690)	60–36 (.625)		
Total:		338–204 (.624)			
National champion Postseason invitational champion Conference regular season champion Conference regular season and conference tournament champion Division regular season champion Division regular season and conference tournament champion Conference tournament champion
