= 2000–01 Michigan State Spartans men's basketball team =

American college basketball season

2000–01 Michigan State Spartans men's basketball

Big Ten regular season co-champions Spartan Coca-Cola Classic champions

NCAA tournament, Final Four
- Conference: Big Ten Conference

Ranking
- Coaches: No. 3
- AP: No. 3
- Record: 28–5 (13–3 Big Ten)
- Head coach: Tom Izzo (6th season)
- Assistant coaches: Stan Heath (5th season); Mike Garland (5th season); Brian Gregory (2nd season)
- Captains: Charlie Bell; Andre Hutson; David Thomas
- Home arena: Breslin Center

2000–01 Big Ten Conference men's basketball standings
	Conf.				Overall
Team	W		L	PCT	W		L	PCT
No. 4 Illinois	13	–	3	.813	27	–	8	.771
No. 3 Michigan State	13	–	3	.813	28	–	5	.848
No. 20 Indiana	10	–	6	.625	21	–	13	.618
No. 25 Wisconsin	9	–	7	.563	18	–	11	.621
No. 24 Iowa †	7	–	9	.438	23	–	12	.657
Penn State	7	–	9	.438	21	–	12	.636
Purdue	6	–	10	.375	17	–	15	.531
Minnesota	5	–	11	.313	18	–	14	.563
Michigan	4	–	12	.250	10	–	18	.357
Northwestern	3	–	13	.188	11	–	19	.367
Ohio State*	0	–	0	–	0	–	0	–
† 2001 Big Ten tournament winner Rankings from AP poll *Ohio State: 30 reg. season games; 1 NCAA Tourn. game vacated due to sanctions against the program Disputed record: Ohio State-(20-11)(11-5)

The 2000–01 Michigan State Spartans men's basketball team represented Michigan State University in the 2000–01 NCAA Division I men's basketball season. Tom Izzo, in his sixth year as head coach, led the team that played their home games at Breslin Center in East Lansing, Michigan and were members of the Big Ten Conference. The Spartans finished the season with a record of 28–5, 13–3 to finish in a tie for the Big Ten regular season championship for the fourth consecutive year. They received an at-large bid to the NCAA tournament. For the third consecutive year, they received a No. 1 seed and reached the Final Four before falling to Arizona.

== Previous season ==
The Spartans finished the 1999–2000 season as NCAA National champions with an overall record of 32–7 and in first place in the Big Ten with a 13–3 record. Michigan State received a No. 1 seed in the NCAA Tournament, their third straight trip to the Tournament, and won the National Championship, the second in school history, by beating Florida in the National Championship game.

The Spartans lost Mateen Cleaves (12.1 PPG, 1.8 RPG, 6.9 APG) and Morris Peterson (16.8 PPG, 6.0 RPG, 1.3 APG) to the NBA draft following the season.

== Season summary ==
Following their National Championship in 2000, Michigan State entered the regular season ranked No. 3 in both polls. The Spartans were led by freshman Zach Randolph (10.8 PPG, 6.7 RPG, 1.0 APG), sophomore Jason Richardson (14.7 PPG, 5.9 RPG, 2.2 APG), and seniors Charlie Bell (13.5 PPG, 4.7 RPG, 5.1 APG), and Andre Hutson (13.8 PPG, 7.6 RPG, 1.9 APG). MSU started the season strong, winning their first 12 games, including wins over No. 6 North Carolina, No. 8 Florida, and No. 8 Seton Hall. After beating Seton Hall, the Spartans ascended to the No. 1 ranking which they held for two weeks. MSU finished the non-conference season at 12–0.

After a loss in their second Big Ten game, MSU cruised through the Big Ten season with wins over No. 17 Wisconsin, No. 25 Iowa, and at No. 22 Wisconsin. finishing 13–3 and sharing the Big Ten Championship with Illinois. The championship marked the fourth consecutive Big Ten championship for the Spartans. The Spartans remained ranked in the top 5 during the entire season, ultimately finishing with a 24–3 overall record and ranked No. 2 in the country. MSU suffered a surprise defeat by Penn State in the Big Ten tournament in their attempt to win the tournament for the third consecutive year.

The Spartans were awarded a No. 1 seed, their third consecutive No. 1 seed, in the South Region of the NCAA Tournament. Seeking a repeat National Championship, MSU easily dispatched Alabama State and Fresno State to reach the Sweet Sixteen for the fourth consecutive year. A win over Gonzaga and Temple led to the school's third straight trip to the Final Four. However, they were unable to repeat as National Champions, losing to Arizona in the National Semifinal.

Following the season, Randolph and Richardson declared for the NBA draft.

== Roster ==
2000–01 Michigan State Spartans men's basketball team
Name	Class	Pos	Height	Summary
Aloysius Anagonye	SO	F	6'8"	4.7 Pts, 3.1 Reb, 0.7 Ast
Jason Andreas	FR	C	6'10"	0.5 Pts, 1.0 Reb, 0.1 Ast
Adam Ballinger	SO	F	6'9"	1.9 Pts, 1.6 Reb, 0.2 Ast
Charlie Bell	SR	G	6'3"	13.5 Pts, 4.7 Reb, 5.1 Ast
Mike Chappell	SR	F	6'9"	4.7 Pts, 1.9 Reb, 0.7 Ast
Andre Hutson	ST	F	6'8"	13.8 Pts, 7.6 Reb, 1.9 Ast
Mat Ishbia	SO	G	5'10"	0.3 Pts, 0.4 Reb, 0.1 Ast
Zach Randolph	FR	C	6'9"	10.8 Pts, 6.7 Reb, 1.0 Ast
Jason Richardson	SO	G	6'6"	14.7 Pts, 5.9 Reb, 2.2 Ast
Brandon Smith	SR	G	6'11"	0.4 Pts, 0.6 Reb, 0.8 Ast
Marcus Taylor	FR	G	6'3"	7.4 Pts, 1.3 Reb, 3.6 Ast
David Thomas	SR	F	6'9"	5.4 Pts, 4.7 Reb, 1.9 Ast
Adam Wolfe	FR	F	6'9"	1.7 Pts, 1.7 Reb, 0.1 Ast

== Schedule and results ==
Date time, TV	Rank^{#}	Opponent^{#}	Result	Record	Site city, state
Exhibition
Nov 7, 2000		Northern Michigan	W 93–40		Breslin Center; East Lansing, MI
Nov 13, 2000; ESPN2		Harlem Globetrotters	W 72–68		Breslin Center; East Lansing, MI
Non-conference regular season
Nov 19, 2000*; 2:00 pm	No. 3	Oakland	W 97–61	1–0	Breslin Center (14,759); East Lansing, MI
Nov 24, 2000; 6:00 pm	No. 4	Cornell; Spartan Coca-Cola Classic	W 89–56	2–0	Breslin Center (14,759); East Lansing, MI
Nov 25, 2000*; 8:40 pm	No. 4	Eastern Washington; Spartan Coca-Cola Classic championship	W 83–61	3–0	Breslin Center (14,759); East Lansing, MI
Nov 29, 2000*; 7:30 pm, ESPN2	No. 3	No. 6 North Carolina; ACC-Big Ten Challenge	W 77–64	4–0	Breslin Center (14,759); East Lansing, MI
Dec 2, 2000*; 7:30 pm	No. 3	UIC	W 97–53	5–0	Breslin Center (14,759); East Lansing, MI
Dec 6, 2000*; 7:00 pm, ESPN	No. 2	No. 8 Florida	W 99–83	6–0	Breslin Center (14,759); East Lansing, MI
Dec 9, 2000*; 1:00 pm, Fox Sports Chicago	No. 2	at Loyola-Chicago	W 103–71	7–0	Joseph J. Gentile Arena (5,513); Chicago, IL
Dec 16, 2000*; 1:00 pm, CBS	No. 2	Kentucky	W 46–45	8–0	Breslin Center (14,759); East Lansing, MI
Dec 19, 2000*; 10:00 pm, ESPN	No. 2	at No. 8 Seton Hall; Jimmy V Classic	W 72–57	9–0	Izod Center; East Rutherford, NJ
Dec 27, 2000*; 8:00 pm, ESPN Plus Local	No. 1	Bowling Green; Sprite Holiday Classic	W 85–69	10–0	The Palace of Auburn Hills (22,076); Detroit, MI
Dec 30, 2000*; 7:30 pm	No. 1	Wright State	W 88–61	11–0	Breslin Center (14,759); East Lansing, MI
Big Ten regular season
Jan 3, 2001; ESPN Plus Local	No. 1	Penn State	W 98–73	12–0 (1–0)	Breslin Center (14,759); East Lansing, MI
Jan 7, 2001; 4:00 pm, CBS	No. 1	at Indiana	L 58–59	12–1 (1–1)	Assembly Hall (17,128); Bloomington, IN
Jan 10, 2001; 8:00 pm, ESPN Plus Local	No. 3	Northwestern	W 84-53	13–1 (2–1)	Breslin Center (14,759); East Lansing, MI
Jan 13, 2001; ESPN Plus Regional	No. 3	No. 17 Wisconsin	W 69–59 ^{OT}	14–1 (3–1)	Breslin Center (14,759); East Lansing, MI
Jan 21, 2001; 1:00 pm, CBS	No. 3	Ohio State	W 71–56	15–1 (4–1)	Breslin Center (14,759); East Lansing, MI
Jan 24, 2001; 7:00 pm, ESPN Plus Local	No. 3	at Northwestern	W 74–58	16–1 (5–1)	Welsh-Ryan Arena (6,525); Evanston, IL
Jan 27, 2001; 3:15 pm, ESPN Plus Regional	No. 3	at Ohio State	L 55–64	16–2 (5–2)	Value City Arena (19,200); Columbus, OH
Jan 30, 2001; 7:00 pm, ESPN	No. 5	at Michigan; Rivalry	W 91–64	17–2 (6–2)	Crisler Arena (13,562); Ann Arbor, MI
Feb 4, 2001; 1:00 pm, CBS	No. 5	Purdue	W 72–55	18–2 (7–2)	Breslin Center (14,759); East Lansing, MI
Feb 6, 2001; 7:00 pm, ESPN	No. 4	at No. 7 Illinois	L 66–77	18–3 (7–3)	Assembly Hall (16,683); Champaign, IL
Feb 10, 2001; 8:00 pm, ESPN Plus Local	No. 4	at Minnesota	W 94–83	19–3 (9–3)	Williams Arena (14,210); Minneapolis, MN
Feb 18, 2001; 4:00 pm, CBS	No. 5	No. 25 Iowa	W 94–70	20–3 (10–3)	Breslin Center (14,749); East Lansing, MI
Feb 20, 2001; 7:00 pm, ESPN	No. 5	Indiana	W 66–57	21–3 (10–3)	Breslin Center (14,759); East Lansing, MI
Feb 24, 2001; 7:00 pm, ESPN	No. 5	at Penn State	W 76–57	22–3 (11–3)	Bryce Jordan Center (15,337); State College, PA
Feb 27, 2001; 9:00 pm, ESPN	No. 3	at No. 22 Wisconsin	W 51–47	23–3 (12–3)	Kohl Center (17,142); Madison, WI
Mar 3, 2001; 4:30 pm, ESPN Plus Regional	No. 2	Michigan; Rivalry	W 78–57	24–3 (13–3)	Breslin Center (14,759); East Lansing, MI
Big Ten tournament
Mar 9, 2001; 7:40 pm, ESPN Plus Regional	(2) No. 2	vs. (7) Penn State quarterfinals	L 63–65	24–4	United Center; Chicago, IL
NCAA tournament
Mar 16, 2001*; 6:40 pm, CBS	(1 S) No. 2	vs. (16 S) Alabama State; First Round	W 69–35	25–4	Pyramid Arena; Memphis, TN
Mar 18, 2001*; CBS	(1 S) No. 2	vs. (9 S) Fresno State; Second Round	W 81–65	26–4	Pyramid Arena (10,719); Memphis, TN
Mar 23, 2001*; 7:38 pm, CBS	(1 S) No. 2	vs. (12 S) Gonzaga; Sweet Sixteen	W 77–62	27–4	Georgia Dome; Atlanta, GA
Mar 25, 2001*; 2:40 pm, CBS	(1 S) No. 2	vs. (11 S) Temple; Elite Eight	W 69–62	28–4	Georgia Dome (25,995); Atlanta, GA
Mar 31, 2001*; 5:42 pm, CBS	(1 S) No. 2	vs. (2 MW) No. 5 Arizona; Final Four	L 61–80	28–5	Hubert H. Humphrey Metrodome (45,406); Minneapolis, MN
*Non-conference game. ^{#}Rankings from AP Poll Source. (#) Tournament seedings in parentheses.

== Rankings ==
Ranking movements Legend: ██ Increase in ranking ██ Decrease in ranking
	Week																			
Poll	Pre	1	2	3	4	5	6	7	8	9	10	11	12	13	14	15	16	17	18	Final
AP	3	3	4	3	2	2	2	1	1	3	3	3	5	4	5	5	3	2	3	Not released
Coaches	5	5^	3	2	2	2	2	1	1	3	3	3	5	4	4	5	3	3	3	3

*AP does not release post-NCAA Tournament rankings
^Coaches did not release a week 2 poll

== Awards and honors ==
- Jason Richardson – All-Big Ten First Team
- Jason Richardson – AP All-American Second Team
- Charlie Bell – All-Big Ten First Team (Media), Second Team (Coaches)
- Andre Hutson – All-Big Ten Second Team
- Tom Izzo - NABC National Coach of the Year
