= 2000–01 NCAA Division I men's basketball rankings =

- Season: 2000–01
- NCAA Tournament: 2001
- Preseason No. 1: Arizona
- NCAA Tournament Champions: Duke
NCAA Division I men's basketball rankings


The 2000–01 NCAA Division I men's basketball rankings were made up of two human polls, the AP Poll and the Coaches Poll, in addition to various other pre-season polls.

== Legend ==
	Increase in ranking
	Decrease in ranking
	New to rankings from previous week
Italics	Number of first place votes
(#–#)	Win–loss record
т	Tied with team above or below also with this symbol

== AP Poll ==
	Preseason Pre	Week 2 Nov. 13	Week 3 Nov. 20	Week 4 Nov. 27	Week 5 Dec. 5	Week 6 Dec. 12	Week 7 Dec. 19	Week 8 Dec. 26	Week 9 Jan. 3	Week 10 Jan. 10	Week 11 Jan. 17	Week 12 Jan. 24	Week 13 Jan. 31	Week 14 Feb. 7	Week 15 Feb. 14	Week 16 Feb. 21	Week 17 Feb. 28	Week 18 Mar. 7	Final Mar. 14	
1.	Arizona	Arizona (0–0)	Arizona (1–0)	Duke (5–0)	Duke (7–0)	Duke (9–0)	Duke (9–0)	Michigan State (9–0)	Michigan State (11–0)	Stanford (13–0)	Stanford (15–0)	Stanford (17–0)	Stanford (19–0)	North Carolina (19–2)	North Carolina (21–2)	Stanford (23–1)	Stanford (25–1)	Stanford (27–1)	Duke (29–4)	1.
2.	Duke	Duke (0–0)	Duke (2–0)	Kansas (5–0)	Michigan State (5–0)	Michigan State (7–0)	Michigan State (8–0)	Stanford (9–0)	Stanford (11–0)	Duke (13–1)	Duke (15–1)	Duke (17–1)	Duke (19–1)	Stanford (20–1)	Stanford (22–1)	North Carolina (21–3)	Duke (25–3)	Michigan State (24–3)	Stanford (28–2)	2.
3.	Michigan State	Michigan State (0–0)	Kansas (3–0)	Michigan State (3–0)	Kansas (7–0)	Stanford (6–0)	Stanford (6–0)	Duke (10–1)	Duke (11–1)	Michigan State (12–1)	Michigan State (14–1)	Michigan State (15–1)	Kansas (17–1)	Duke (20–2)	Duke (22–2)	Illinois (21–5)	Michigan State (22–3)	Duke (26–4)	Michigan State (24–4)	3.
4.	Stanford	Kansas (2–0)	Michigan State (1–0)	Stanford (4–0)	Stanford (6–0)	Tennessee (8–0)	Tennessee (9–0)	Wake Forest (10–0)	Wake Forest (11–0)	Tennessee (14–1)	Tennessee (16–1)	Kansas (15–1)	North Carolina (17–2)	Michigan State (18–2)	Illinois (19–5)	Duke (23–3)	North Carolina (22–4)	Illinois (23–6)	Illinois (24–7)	4.
5.	Maryland	Stanford (0–0)	Stanford (1–0)	Arizona (3–1)	Arizona (5–1)	Illinois (7–2)	Illinois (8–2)	Florida (9–1)	Florida (10–1)	Kansas (12–1)	Kansas (13–1)	North Carolina (15–2)	Michigan State (16–2)	Kansas (18–2)	Michigan State (19–3)	Michigan State (20–3)	Illinois (22–6)	Florida (22–5)	Arizona (23–7)	5.
6.	North Carolina	Maryland (0–0)	Maryland (0–0)	North Carolina (3–0)	Tennessee (6–0)	Wake Forest (7–0)	Wake Forest (8–0)	Tennessee (10–1)	Tennessee (13–1)	Wake Forest (12–1)	North Carolina (13–2)	Tennessee (17–2)	Illinois (16–4)	Virginia (15–4)	Kansas (19–3)	Iowa State (22–3)	Florida (20–5)	North Carolina (23–5)	North Carolina (25–6)	6.
7.	Kansas	North Carolina (2–0)	North Carolina (3–0)	Tennessee (3–0)	Seton Hall (4–0)	Arizona (5–2)	Florida (6–1)	Kansas (10–1)	Kansas (11–1)	Illinois (12–3)	Florida (11–2)	Illinois (15–4)	Arizona (14–5)	Illinois (17–5)	Iowa State (21–3)	Florida (18–5)	Virginia (19–6)	Iowa State (25–4)	Boston College (26–4)	7.
8.	Illinois	Illinois (0–0)	Illinois (1–0)	Seton Hall (2–0)	Florida (3–0)	Florida (5–1)	Seton Hall (6–1)	Virginia (8–0)	Virginia (10–0)	Florida (10–2)	Syracuse (15–1)	Maryland (14–4)	Tennessee (17–3)	Florida (15–4)	Arizona (17–6)	Arizona (18–7)	Iowa State (23–4)	Arizona (21–7)	Florida (23–6)	8.
9.	Tennessee	Tennessee (0–0)	Tennessee (2–0)	Illinois (4–1)	Illinois (5–2)	Seton Hall (5–1)	Kansas (9–1)	Illinois (9–3)	Illinois (10–3)	North Carolina (11–2)	Georgetown (15–0)	Wake Forest (14–3)	Maryland (14–5)	Syracuse (18–3)	Boston College (18–2)	Virginia (18–6)	Arizona (19–7)	Kansas (23–5)	Kentucky (22–9)	9.
10.	Seton Hall	Seton Hall (0–0)	Seton Hall (1–0)	Florida (1–0)	Notre Dame (4–0)	Kansas (7–1)	Arizona (5–3)	Connecticut (9–1)	Connecticut (11–1)	Virginia (11–1)	Wake Forest (13–2)	Georgetown (16–1)	Wisconsin (13–4)	Tennessee (18–4)	Syracuse (19–4)	Boston College (19–3)	Kansas (21–5)	Boston College (23–4)	Iowa State (25–5)	10.
11.	Florida	Florida (0–0)	Florida (1–0)	Notre Dame (3–0)	Wake Forest (6–0)	Connecticut (7–1)	Connecticut (8–1)	Seton Hall (7–2)	Seton Hall (9–2)	Syracuse (13–1)	Illinois (13–4)	Syracuse (15–2)	Virginia (14–4)	Arizona (15–6)	Florida (16–5)	Kansas (19–5)	Boston College (20–4)	Maryland (20–9)	Maryland (21–10)	11.
12.	Kentucky	Utah (0–0)	Connecticut (1–0)	Wake Forest (4–0)	USC (4–0)	Syracuse (8–0)	Syracuse (9–0)	Arizona (8–3)	Wisconsin (9–1)	Georgetown (13–0)	Maryland (12–4)	Arizona (12–5)	Syracuse (16–3)	Iowa State (19–3)	Virginia (16–6)	Ole Miss (21–4)	UCLA (19–6)	Virginia (20–7)	Kansas (24–6)	12.
13.	Utah	Connecticut (0–0)	Utah (1–0)	Maryland (1–2)	Syracuse (7–0)	USC (6–0)	USC (7–0)	Wisconsin (8–1)	North Carolina (9–2)	Connecticut (12–2)	Virginia (11–3)	Virginia (13–3)	Florida (13–4)	Maryland (15–6)	Oklahoma (19–4)	Kentucky (17–7)	Notre Dame (19–6)	UCLA (20–7)	Oklahoma (26–6)	13.
14.	Connecticut	UCLA (1–1)	Notre Dame (1–0)	Oklahoma (5–0)	North Carolina (3–2)	Virginia (6–0)	Virginia (6–0)	North Carolina (7–2)	Syracuse (11–1)	Maryland (11–3)	Iowa (14–2)	Florida (11–4)	Georgetown (17–2)	Iowa (17–4)	Notre Dame (16–5)	Alabama (20–5)	Ole Miss (22–5)	Ole Miss (23–6)	Ole Miss (25–7)	14.
15.	Arkansas т	Arkansas (0–0)	UCLA (1–1)	USC (3–0)	Connecticut (6–1)	North Carolina (5–2)	North Carolina (6–2)	Syracuse (9–1)	Oklahoma (11–1)	Seton Hall (10–3)	Alabama (13–2)	Wisconsin (11–4)	Iowa State (17–3)	Georgetown (18–3)	Tennessee (18–6)	UCLA (17–6)	Kentucky (18–8)	Kentucky (19–9)	UCLA (21–8)	15.
16.	Notre Dame т	Notre Dame (0–0)	Cincinnati (1–0)	Connecticut (3–1)	Virginia (4–0)	Wisconsin (5–1)	Wisconsin (7–1)	USC (9–1)	Arizona (8–4)	Alabama (12–1)	Connecticut (13–3)	Seton Hall (12–5)	Wake Forest (14–5)	Wisconsin (14–5)	Ole Miss (19–4)	Oklahoma (20–5)	Maryland (18–9)	Oklahoma (23–6)	Virginia (20–8)	16.
17.	UCLA	Cincinnati (0–0)	Wake Forest (2–0)	Temple (4–1)	Wisconsin (3–1)	Cincinnati (3–1)	Alabama (7–0)	Oklahoma (9–1)	Maryland (9–3)	Wisconsin (10–2)	Arizona (10–5)	Iowa State (15–3)	Alabama (16–3)	Boston College (16–2)	Maryland (15–8)	Syracuse (19–6)	Oklahoma (21–6)	Syracuse (22–7)	Syracuse (24–8)	17.
18.	Cincinnati	Wake Forest (0–0)	Wisconsin (0–0)	Utah (3–1)	Cincinnati (3–1)	Alabama (6–0)	Oklahoma (7–1)	Maryland (7–3)	Alabama (10–1)	Iowa State (13–1)	Seton Hall (11–4)	Alabama (14–3)	Iowa (16–4)	Alabama (17–4)	Georgetown (19–4)	Notre Dame (17–6)	Saint Joseph's (23–4)	Georgetown (23–6)	Texas (25–8)	18.
19.	Wisconsin	Wisconsin (0–0)	Oklahoma (2–0)	St. John's (3–1)	Maryland (3–3)	Oklahoma (6–1)	Iowa (8–0)	Cincinnati (8–2)	Georgetown (11–0)	USC (12–2)	Wisconsin (10–4)	Ole Miss (15–3)	Fresno State (17–2)	Wake Forest (15–5)	Wisconsin (15–6)	Wisconsin (16–7)	Syracuse (20–7)	Notre Dame (19–8)	Notre Dame (19–9)	19.
20.	Wake Forest	Kentucky (0–2)	USC (1–0)	Syracuse (4–0)	Oklahoma (5–1)	Maryland (5–3)	Maryland (6–3)	Alabama (9–1)	USC (10–2)	Ole Miss (13–1)	Missouri (12–3)	Texas (15–3)	Boston College (14–2)	Notre Dame (14–5)	Fresno State (20–3)	Maryland (16–9)	Alabama (20–7)	Texas (23–7)	Indiana (21–12)	20.
21.	DePaul	Oklahoma (0–0)	DePaul (1–0)	Virginia (3–0)	Arkansas (5–1)	Notre Dame (4–2)	Notre Dame (5–2)	Georgetown (10–0)	Notre Dame (8–2)	Arizona (8–5)	Ole Miss (14–2)	Iowa (14–4)	USC (15–4)	Oklahoma (17–4)	Alabama (18–5)	Georgetown (20–5)	Georgetown (21–6)	Saint Joseph's (24–5)	Georgetown (23–7)	21.
22.	Oklahoma	DePaul (0–0)	Kentucky (0–2)	Cincinnati (2–1)	Utah (4–2)	Iowa (7–0)	Cincinnati (5–2)	Notre Dame (7–2)	Ole Miss (12–1)	Oklahoma (11–2)	Oklahoma (12–3)	Fresno State (16–2)	Seton Hall (12–6)	USC (16–5)	Kentucky (15–7)	Tennessee (18–8)	Wisconsin (17–8)	Wake Forest (19–9)	Saint Joseph's (25–6)	22.
23.	USC	USC (0–0)	St. John's (2–1)	Wisconsin (1–1)	Alabama (3–0)	Ole Miss (7–0)	Georgetown (9–0)	Iowa (9–1)	Iowa State (11–1)	Texas (11–2)	Iowa State (13–3)	Boston College (13–2)	Notre Dame (13–5)	Fresno State (18–3)	Wake Forest (16–7)	Saint Joseph's (21–4)	Wake Forest (19–9)	Wisconsin (18–9)	Wake Forest (19–10)	23.
24.	Virginia	St. John's (1–1)	Arkansas (1–1)	Dayton (2–1)	St. John's (4–2)	Georgetown (7–0)	Ole Miss (8–0)	Ole Miss (11–1)	Texas (10–2)	Boston College (11–0)	USC (12–3)	Connecticut (13–5)	Oklahoma (15–4)	Xavier (17–3)	UCLA (15–6)	Wake Forest (17–8)	Texas (21–7)	Ohio State (20–9)	Iowa (22–11)	24.
25.	Iowa State	Virginia (0–0)	Virginia (1–0)	Arkansas (3–1)	Iowa State (5–0)	Arkansas (6–2)	Arkansas (6–2)	Iowa State (10–1)	Cincinnati (9–3)	Notre Dame (9–3)	Boston College (12–1)	USC (13–4)	Georgia (13–7)	Ole Miss (17–4)	Iowa (17–6)	Providence (18–7)	Xavier (21–5)	Fresno State (24–5)	Wisconsin (18–10)	25.
	Preseason Pre	Week 2 Nov. 13	Week 3 Nov. 20	Week 4 Nov. 27	Week 5 Dec. 5	Week 6 Dec. 12	Week 7 Dec. 19	Week 8 Dec. 26	Week 9 Jan. 3	Week 10 Jan. 10	Week 11 Jan. 17	Week 12 Jan. 24	Week 13 Jan. 31	Week 14 Feb. 7	Week 15 Feb. 14	Week 16 Feb. 21	Week 17 Feb. 28	Week 18 Mar. 7	Final Mar. 14	
		Dropped: Iowa State (0–0)	None	Dropped: UCLA (1–2); DePaul (3–1); Kentucky	Dropped: Temple (4–3); Dayton	Dropped: Utah; St. John's; Iowa State (6–1)	None	Dropped: Arkansas (7–3)	Dropped: Iowa (11–2)	Dropped: Cincinnati	Dropped: Texas; Notre Dame	Dropped: Missouri; Oklahoma	Dropped: Ole Miss; Texas (15–5); Connecticut (13–6)	Dropped: Seton Hall; Georgia	Dropped: USC (16–6); Xavier	Dropped: Fresno State (20–5); Iowa (17–8)	Dropped: Tennessee (19–9); Providence	Dropped: Alabama (21–8); Xavier	Dropped: Ohio State (20–10); Fresno State (25–6)	

== Coaches Poll ==
	Preseason	Week 2 Nov. 22	Week 3 Nov. 29	Week 4 Dec. 6	Week 5 Dec. 13	Week 6 Dec. 20	Week 7 Dec. 27	Week 8 Jan. 3	Week 9 Jan. 10	Week 10 Jan. 17	Week 11 Jan. 24	Week 12 Jan. 31	Week 13 Feb. 7	Week 14 Feb. 14	Week 15 Feb. 21	Week 16 Feb. 28	Week 17 Mar. 7	Week 18 Mar. 14	Final Apr. 3	
1.	Arizona	Duke (2–0)	Duke (5–0)	Duke (7–0)	Duke (9–0)	Duke (9–0)	Michigan State (9–0)	Michigan State (11–0)	Stanford (13–0)	Stanford (15–0)	Stanford (17–0)	Stanford (19–0)	North Carolina (19–2)	North Carolina (21–2)	Stanford (23–1)	Stanford (25–1)	Stanford (27–1)	Duke (29–4)	Duke (35–4)	1.
2.	Duke	Arizona (1–0)	Michigan State (3–0)	Michigan State (5–0)	Michigan State (7–0)	Michigan State (8–0)	Stanford (9–0)	Stanford (11–0)	Duke (13–1)	Duke (15–1)	Duke (17–1)	Duke (19–1)	Stanford (20–1)	Stanford (22–1)	North Carolina (21–3)	Duke (25–3)	Duke (26–4)	Stanford (28–2)	Arizona (28–8)	2.
3.	Stanford	Michigan State (1–0)	Stanford (4–0)	Stanford (6–0)	Stanford (6–0)	Stanford (6–0)	Duke (10–1)	Duke (11–1)	Michigan State (12–1)	Michigan State (14–1)	Michigan State (15–1)	Kansas (17–1)	Duke (20–2)	Duke (22–2)	Duke (23–3)	Michigan State (22–3)	Michigan State (24–3)	Michigan State (24–4)	Michigan State (28–5)	3.
4.	North Carolina	Kansas (3–0)	Kansas (5–0)	Kansas (7–0)	Tennessee (8–0)	Tennessee (9–0)	Wake Forest (10–0)	Wake Forest (11–0)	Tennessee (14–1)	Tennessee (16–1)	Kansas (15–1)	North Carolina (17–2)	Michigan State (18–2)	Michigan State (19–3)	Illinois (21–5)	North Carolina (22–4)	Illinois (23–6)	Arizona (23–7)	Maryland (25–11)	4.
5.	Michigan State	Stanford (1–0)	Arizona (3–1)	Arizona (5–1)	Illinois (7–2)	Illinois (8–2)	Tennessee (10–1)	Tennessee (13–1)	Kansas (12–1)	Kansas (13–1)	Tennessee (17–2)	Michigan State (16–2)	Kansas (18–2)	Illinois (19–5)	Michigan State (20–3)	Illinois (22–6)	North Carolina (23–5)	North Carolina (25–6)	Stanford (31–3)	5.
6.	Kansas	Maryland (0–0)	North Carolina (3–0)	Tennessee (6–0)	Arizona (5–2)	Wake Forest (8–0)	Illinois (9–3)	Florida (10–1)	Wake Forest (12–1)	North Carolina (13–2)	North Carolina (15–2)	Illinois (16–4)	Illinois (17–5)	Kansas (19–3)	Iowa State (22–3)	Florida (20–5)	Florida (22–5)	Illinois (24–7)	Illinois (27–8)	6.
7.	Maryland	North Carolina (3–0)	Tennessee (3–0)	Illinois (5–2)	Wake Forest (7–0)	Florida (6–1)	Florida (9–1)	Kansas (11–1)	Florida (10–2)	Florida (11–2)	Illinois (15–4)	Tennessee (17–3)	Syracuse (18–3)	Syracuse (19–4)	Florida (18–5)	Arizona (19–7)	Arizona (21–7)	Boston College (26–4)	Kansas (26–7)	7.
8.	Tennessee	Illinois (1–0)	Illinois (4–1)	Seton Hall (4–0)	Kansas (7–1)	Arizona (5–3)	Kansas (10–1)	Illinois (10–3)	Illinois (12–3)	Wake Forest (13–2)	Wake Forest (14–3) т	Syracuse (16–3)	Tennessee (18–4)	Arizona (17–6)	Arizona (18–7)	Iowa State (23–4)	Iowa State (25–4)	Florida (23–6)	Kentucky (24–10)	8.
9.	Illinois	Tennessee (2–0)	Seton Hall (2–0)	Florida (3–0)	Florida (5–1)	Kansas (9–1)	Virginia (8–0)	Virginia (10–0)	Virginia (11–1)	Syracuse (15–1)	Syracuse (15–2) т	Arizona (14–5)	Virginia (15–4)	Iowa State (21–3) т	Boston College (19–3)	Virginia (19–6)	Boston College (23–4)	Iowa State (25–5)	Ole Miss (27–8)	9.
10.	Seton Hall	Seton Hall (1–0)	Florida (1–0)	Notre Dame (4–0)	Seton Hall (5–1)	Syracuse (9–0)	Arizona (8–3)	Connecticut (11–1)	Syracuse (13–1)	Illinois (13–4)	Maryland (14–4)	Maryland (14–5)	Arizona (15–6)	Florida (16–5) т	Kansas (19–5)	Boston College (20–4)	Kansas (23–5)	Kentucky (22–9)	North Carolina (26–7)	10.
11.	Florida	Florida (1–0)	Notre Dame (3–0)	Wake Forest (6–0)	Connecticut (7–1)	Seton Hall (6–1)	Connecticut (9–1)	Seton Hall (9–2)	North Carolina (11–2)	Georgetown (15–0)	Georgetown (16–1)	Virginia (14–4)	Florida (15–4)	Boston College (18–2)	Virginia (18–6)	Kansas (21–5)	Ole Miss (23–6)	Maryland (21–10)	Boston College (27–5)	11.
12.	Kentucky	Connecticut (1–0)	Wake Forest (4–0)	North Carolina (3–2)	Syracuse (8–0)	Connecticut (8–1)	Seton Hall (7–2)	Wisconsin (9–1)	Connecticut (12–2)	Alabama (13–2)	Virginia (13–3)	Wake Forest (14–5)	Georgetown (18–3)	Virginia (16–6)	Syracuse (19–6)	Ole Miss (22–5)	Virginia (20–7)	Kansas (24–6)	UCLA (23–9)	12.
13.	Connecticut	Cincinnati (1–0)	Oklahoma (5–0)	Connecticut (6–1)	USC (6–0)	USC (7–0)	Syracuse (9–1)	Syracuse (11–1)	Georgetown (13–0)	Virginia (11–3)	Arizona (12–5)	Georgetown (17–2)	Maryland (15–6)	Tennessee (18–6)	Ole Miss (21–4)	Notre Dame (19–6) т	Maryland (20–9)	Ole Miss (25–7)	Florida (24–7)	13.
14.	Cincinnati	Utah (1–0)	Maryland (1–2)	Syracuse (7–0)	Virginia (6–0)	Virginia (6–0)	Wisconsin (8–1)	North Carolina (9–2)	Alabama (12–1)	Maryland (12–4)	Florida (11–4)	Florida (13–4)	Iowa State (19–3)	Oklahoma (19–4)	Alabama (20–5)	Syracuse (20–7) т	Syracuse (22–7)	Oklahoma (26–6)	USC (24–10)	14.
15.	Arkansas	Notre Dame (1–0)	Temple (4–1)	USC (4–0)	North Carolina (5–2)	Wisconsin (7–1)	USC (9–1)	Arizona (8–4)	Seton Hall (10–3)	Connecticut (13–3)	Alabama (14–3)	Alabama (16–3)	Wake Forest (15–5)	Wake Forest (16–7)	Oklahoma (20–5)	Kentucky (18–8)	Kentucky (19–9)	Virginia (20–8)	Iowa State (25–6)	15.
16.	Utah	Wake Forest (2–0)	Connecticut (3–1)	Oklahoma (5–1)	Oklahoma (6–1)	North Carolina (6–2)	North Carolina (7–2)	Oklahoma (11–1)	Maryland (11–3)	Iowa (14–2)	Wisconsin (11–4)	Wisconsin (13–4)	Iowa (17–4)	Georgetown (19–4)	Kentucky (17–7)	Maryland (18–9)	Oklahoma (23–6)	Syracuse (24–8)	Temple (24–13)	16.
17.	Notre Dame	UCLA (1–1)	Cincinnati (2–1)	Maryland (3–3)	Wisconsin (5–1)	Oklahoma (7–1)	Oklahoma (9–1)	Maryland (9–3)	Wisconsin (10–2)	Arizona (10–5)	Iowa (14–4)	Iowa (16–4)	Alabama (17–4)	Alabama (18–5)	Wisconsin (16–7)	Oklahoma (21–6)	UCLA (20–7)	Texas (25–8)	Georgetown (25–8)	17.
18.	Wake Forest	Arkansas (1–1)	USC (3–0)	Cincinnati (3–1)	Cincinnati (3–1)	Alabama (7–0)	Cincinnati (8–2)	Alabama (10–1)	USC (12–2)	Wisconsin (10–4)	Iowa State (15–3)	Iowa State (17–3)	Wisconsin (14–5)	Maryland (15–8)	Notre Dame (17–6)	UCLA (19–6)	Notre Dame (19–8)	UCLA (21–8)	Syracuse (25–9)	18.
19.	UCLA	Oklahoma (2–0)	Syracuse (4–0)	Virginia (4–0)	Maryland (5–3)	Maryland (6–3)	Maryland (7–3)	USC (10–2)	Oklahoma (11–2)	Seton Hall (11–4)	Seton Hall (12–5)	USC (15–4)	USC (16–5)	Ole Miss (19–4)	Georgetown (20–5)	Alabama (20–7)	Georgetown (23–6)	Notre Dame (19–9)	Oklahoma (26–7)	19.
20.	DePaul	Wisconsin (0–0)	Utah (3–1)	Wisconsin (3–1)	Notre Dame (4–2)	Cincinnati (5–2)	Alabama (9–1)	Georgetown (11–0)	Arizona (8–5)	USC (12–3)	Connecticut (13–5)	Boston College (14–2)	Boston College (16–2)	Wisconsin (15–6)	Maryland (16–9)	Georgetown (21–6)	Wake Forest (19–9)	Georgetown (23–7)	Gonzaga (26–7)	20.
21.	Oklahoma	Kentucky (0–2)	St. John's (3–1)	Arkansas (5–1)	Arkansas (6–2)	Iowa (8–0)	Georgetown (10–0)	Ole Miss (12–1)	Ole Miss (13–1)	Oklahoma (12–3)	Ole Miss (15–3)	Oklahoma (15–4)	Oklahoma (17–4)	Notre Dame (16–5)	Tennessee (18–8)	Wake Forest (19–9)	Wisconsin (18–9)	Indiana (21–12)	Virginia (20–9)	21.
22.	Wisconsin	DePaul (1–0)	Virginia (3–0)	Utah (4–2)	Alabama (6–0)	Georgetown (9–0)	Iowa (9–1)	Texas (10–2)	Texas (11–2)	Ole Miss (14–2)	USC (13–4)	Fresno State (17–2)	Fresno State (18–3)	Fresno State (20–3)	Wake Forest (17–8)	Saint Joseph's (23–4)	Texas (23–7)	Wake Forest (19–10)	Cincinnati (25–10)	22.
23.	Iowa State	USC (1–0)	Wisconsin (1–1)	Temple (4–3)	Georgetown (7–0)	Arkansas (6–2)	Notre Dame (7–2)	Iowa (11–2)	Iowa State (13–1)	Iowa State (13–3)	Texas (15–3)	Connecticut (13–6)	Notre Dame (14–5)	USC (16–6)	UCLA (17–6)	Tennessee (19–9)	Saint Joseph's (24–5)	Saint Joseph's (25–6)	Notre Dame (20–10)	23.
24.	USC	St. John's (1–1)	Arkansas (3–1)	St. John's (4–2)	Charlotte (6–1)	Notre Dame (5–2)	Ole Miss (11–1)	Cincinnati (9–3)	Iowa (12–2)	Texas (12–3)	Oklahoma (13–4)	Texas (15–5)	Ole Miss (17–4)	Iowa (17–6)	Saint Joseph's (21–4)	Wisconsin (17–8)	Tennessee (21–9)	Wisconsin (18–10)	Saint Joseph's (26–7)	24.
25.	Virginia	Temple (3–0)	DePaul (3–1)	Texas (5–1)	Iowa (7–0)	Ole Miss (8–0)	Texas (8–3)	Notre Dame (8–2)	Notre Dame (9–3)	Boston College (12–1)	Boston College (13–2)	Seton Hall (12–6)	Texas (16–6)	Kentucky (15–7)	Fresno State (20–5)	Fresno State (21–5)	Fresno State (24–5) т Alabama (21–8) т	Iowa (22–11)	Penn State (21–12)	25.
	Preseason	Week 2 Nov. 22	Week 3 Nov. 29	Week 4 Dec. 6	Week 5 Dec. 13	Week 6 Dec. 20	Week 7 Dec. 27	Week 8 Jan. 3	Week 9 Jan. 10	Week 10 Jan. 17	Week 11 Jan. 24	Week 12 Jan. 31	Week 13 Feb. 7	Week 14 Feb. 14	Week 15 Feb. 21	Week 16 Feb. 28	Week 17 Mar. 7	Week 18 Mar. 14	Final Apr. 3	
		Dropped: Iowa State (1–0); Virginia (2–0)	Dropped: UCLA (1–2); Kentucky	Dropped: DePaul	Dropped: Utah; Temple; St. John's (4–3); Texas (5–2)	Dropped: Charlotte	Dropped: Arkansas (7–3)	None	Dropped: Cincinnati	Dropped: Notre Dame	None	Dropped: Ole Miss	Dropped: Connecticut (15–7)	Dropped: Texas	Dropped: USC; Iowa (17–8)	None	None	Dropped: Tennessee; Fresno State; Alabama	Dropped: Texas (25–9); Indiana (21–13); Wake Forest (19–11); Iowa (23–12); Wisconsin (18–11)	
