= Conference USA men's basketball tournament =

Annual college basketball tournament

C-USA men's basketball tournament
- Sport: Basketball
- Conference: Conference USA
- Number of teams: 12
- Format: Single-elimination tournament
- Current stadium: Propst Arena
- Current location: Huntsville, Alabama
- Played: 1996–present
- Last contest: 2026
- Current champion: Kennesaw State Owls
- Most championships: Memphis Tigers (6)
- Official website: ConferenceUSA.com Men's Basketball

The Conference USA men's basketball tournament is held annually following the end of the regular season of NCAA Division I Men's Basketball.

== Format and hosts ==
After the conference realignment, the tournament was held at FedExForum in Memphis, Tennessee, for five seasons. It moved to the BOK Center in Tulsa, Oklahoma for the 2010, and then to El Paso, Texas, at the Don Haskins Center for 2011. It returned to FedExForum in 2012, and was set to be played there in 2013, as well. However, after Memphis' decision to leave Conference USA for what ultimately became the American Athletic Conference in 2013–14, the league decided to move the tournament to a site near a school remaining in the conference, ultimately selecting the BOK Center in Tulsa. The tournament returned to the Haskins Center in El Paso in 2014. In 2015, the tournament moved to Birmingham, Alabama and the Legacy Arena for three years. In 2017, C-USA signed a deal with the NFL's Dallas Cowboys to move its men's and women's tournaments to the Ford Center, an indoor stadium at the Cowboys' headquarters in the Dallas suburb of Frisco, Texas. This deal, originally for the 2018 and 2019 tournaments, was later extended through 2021, and eventually 2023. After that season, C-USA announced that the men's and women's tournaments would move to Propst Arena in Huntsville, Alabama for at least 2024 and 2025, extended to 2026.

== Tournament results ==
Year	Champion	Score	Runner-up	Tournament MVP	Location
1996	Cincinnati	85–83 (OT)	Marquette	Danny Fortson, Cincinnati	The Pyramid; Memphis, Tennessee
1997	Marquette	60–52	Charlotte	Aaron Hutchins, Marquette	Kiel Center; St. Louis
1998	Cincinnati	71–57	Charlotte	Kenyon Martin, Cincinnati	Myrl Shoemaker Center; Cincinnati
1999	Charlotte	68–59	Louisville	Galen Young, Charlotte	BJCC Coliseum; Birmingham, Alabama
2000	Saint Louis	56–49	DePaul	Justin Love, Saint Louis	The Pyramid; Memphis, Tennessee
2001	Charlotte	80–72	Cincinnati	Rodney White, Charlotte	Freedom Hall; Louisville, Kentucky
2002	Cincinnati	77–63	Marquette	Steve Logan, Cincinnati	Firstar Center; Cincinnati, Ohio
2003	Louisville	83–78	UAB	Luke Whitehead, Louisville	Freedom Hall; Louisville, Kentucky
2004	Cincinnati	55–50	DePaul	Tony Bobbitt, Cincinnati	U.S. Bank Arena; Cincinnati, Ohio
2005	Louisville	75–74	Memphis	Taquan Dean, Louisville	FedExForum; Memphis, Tennessee
2006	Memphis	57–46	UAB	Shawne Williams, Memphis	FedExForum; Memphis, Tennessee
2007	Memphis	71–59	Houston	Chris Douglas-Roberts, Memphis	FedExForum; Memphis, Tennessee
2008	Memphis (Note: NCAA ruled that Memphis vacate wins from the 2007–2008 season.)	77–51	Tulsa	Antonio Anderson, Memphis	FedExForum; Memphis, Tennessee
2009	Memphis	64–39	Tulsa	Tyreke Evans, Memphis	FedExForum; Memphis, Tennessee
2010	Houston	81–73	UTEP	Kelvin Lewis, Houston	BOK Center; Tulsa, Oklahoma
2011	Memphis	67–66	UTEP	Joe Jackson, Memphis	Don Haskins Center; El Paso, Texas
2012	Memphis	83–57	Marshall	Joe Jackson, Memphis	FedExForum; Memphis, Tennessee
2013	Memphis	91–79 (2OT)	Southern Miss	Chris Crawford, Memphis	BOK Center; Tulsa, Oklahoma
2014	Tulsa	69–60	Louisiana Tech	James Woodard, Tulsa	Don Haskins Center; El Paso, Texas
2015	UAB	73–60	Middle Tennessee	Robert Brown, UAB	Legacy Arena; Birmingham, Alabama
2016	Middle Tennessee	55–53	Old Dominion	Reggie Upshaw, Middle Tennessee	Legacy Arena; Birmingham, Alabama
2017	Middle Tennessee	83–72	Marshall	Giddy Potts, Middle Tennessee	Legacy Arena; Birmingham, Alabama
2018	Marshall	67–66	Western Kentucky	Jon Elmore, Marshall	Ford Center at The Star; Frisco, Texas
2019	Old Dominion	62–56	Western Kentucky	Xavier Green, Old Dominion	Ford Center at The Star; Frisco, Texas
2020	Canceled due to the COVID-19 pandemic				
2021	North Texas	61–57	Western Kentucky	Javion Hamlet, North Texas	Ford Center at The Star; Frisco, Texas
2022	UAB	82–73	Louisiana Tech	Jordan Walker, UAB	Ford Center at The Star; Frisco, Texas
2023	Florida Atlantic	78–56	UAB	Alijah Martin, FAU	Ford Center at The Star; Frisco, Texas
2024	Western Kentucky	78–71	UTEP	Don McHenry, Western Kentucky	Propst Arena; Huntsville, Alabama
2025	Liberty	79–67	Jacksonville State	Kaden Metheny, Liberty	Propst Arena; Huntsville, Alabama
2026	Kennesaw State	71–60	Louisiana Tech	RJ Johnson, Kennesaw State	Propst Arena; Huntsville, Alabama

== Tournament Championships by School ==
=== Current members ===
School	Championships	Championship Years
Middle Tennessee	2	2016, 2017
Western Kentucky	1	2024
Liberty	1	2025
Kennesaw State	1	2026
Delaware	0	
FIU	0	
Jacksonville State	0	
Missouri State	0	
New Mexico State	0	
Sam Houston	0	

=== Former members ===
Former members that have won the tournament as of July 1, 2023.

School	Championships	Championship Years
Memphis	7	2006, 2007, 2008*, 2009, 2011, 2012, 2013
Cincinnati	4	1996, 1998, 2002, 2004
Charlotte	2	1999, 2001
Louisville	2	2003, 2005
UAB	2	2015, 2022
Florida Atlantic	1	2023
Houston	1	2010
Marquette	1	1997
Marshall	1	2018
North Texas	1	2021
Old Dominion	1	2019
Saint Louis	1	2000
Tulsa	1	2014

- NCAA ruled that Memphis vacate wins from the 2007–2008 season.

== Broadcasters ==
=== Television ===
Year	Network	Play-by-play	Analyst	Sideline
2024	CBSSN	Carter Blackburn	Avery Johnson	Tiffany Blackmon
2023	CBSSN	Carter Blackburn	Avery Johnson	Jenny Dell
2022	CBSSN	John Sadak	Avery Johnson	AJ Ross
2021	CBSSN	Carter Blackburn	Avery Johnson	
2020	Cancelled due to the coronavirus pandemic			
2019	CBSSN	Carter Blackburn	Pete Gillen	John Schriffen
2018	CBSSN	Carter Blackburn	Pete Gillen	Jamie Erdahl
2017	CBSSN	Carter Blackburn	Pete Gillen	
2016	Fox Sports 1	Aaron Goldsmith	Mike Jarvis	
2015	Fox Sports 1	Joe Davis	Mike Jarvis	
2014	CBS	Ian Eagle	Jim Spanarkel	
2010	CBS	Gus Johnson	Dan Bonner	
2009	CBS	Gus Johnson	Dan Bonner	
2008	CBS	Dick Enberg	Bob Wenzel	
2007	CBS	Gus Johnson	Dan Bonner	
2006	CBS	Gus Johnson	Dan Bonner	
2005	CBS	Verne Lundquist	Jim Spanarkel	
2004	CBS	Gus Johnson	Dan Bonner	
2003	CBS	Gus Johnson	Dan Bonner	
2002	CBS	Gus Johnson	Dan Bonner	
2001	CBS	Dick Enberg	Bill Walton	
2000	CBS	Verne Lundquist	Bill Raftery	
1999	CBS	Sean McDonough	Bill Raftery	
1998	CBS	Gus Johnson	Jim Spanarkel	
1997	CBS	Tim Ryan	Al McGuire	
1996	CBS	Tim Ryan	Al McGuire and Denny Crum	

=== Radio ===
Year	Network	Play-by-play	Analyst
2013	Dial Global Sports	Dave Ryan	Pete Gillen
2012	Dial Global Sports	Dave Ryan	Pete Gillen
2011	Dial Global Sports	Dave Ryan	Pete Gillen
2010	Dial Global Sports	Dave Ryan	Pete Gillen
2009	Dial Global Sports	Kevin Kugler	Pete Gillen
2007	Dial Global Sports	Marc Vandermeer	Pete Gillen

== See also ==
- Conference USA women's basketball tournament
