= 2000–01 Marquette Golden Eagles men's basketball team =

Marquette University Team

2000–01 Marquette Golden Eagles men's basketball
- Conference: Conference USA
- Record: 15–14 (9–7 CUSA)
- Head coach: Tom Crean (2nd season)
- Assistant coaches: Darrin Horn (2nd season); Tod Kowalczyk (1st season); Dwayne Stephens (2nd season)
- Home arena: Bradley Center

2000–01 Conference USA men's basketball standings
	Conf.				Overall
Team	W		L	PCT	W		L	PCT
American
Cincinnati	11	–	5	.688	25	–	10	.714
Charlotte †	10	–	6	.625	22	–	11	.667
Marquette	9	–	7	.563	15	–	14	.517
Saint Louis	8	–	8	.500	17	–	14	.548
Louisville	8	–	8	.500	12	–	19	.387
DePaul	4	–	12	.250	12	–	18	.400
National
Southern Miss	11	–	5	.688	22	–	9	.710
Memphis	10	–	6	.625	21	–	15	.583
South Florida	9	–	7	.563	18	–	13	.581
UAB	8	–	8	.500	17	–	14	.548
Houston	6	–	10	.375	9	–	20	.310
Tulane	2	–	14	.125	9	–	21	.300
† 2001 Conference USA Tournament winner Rankings from AP Poll

The 2000–01 Marquette Warriors men's basketball team represented Marquette University during the 2000–01 men's college basketball season. Their head coach was Tom Crean. The Golden Eagles finished the regular season with a record of 15–14, 9–7.

== Preseason ==
Coach Crean returned four starters from the previous season, where the Golden Eagles went 15–14 and went to the 2000 NIT. The team's chances were dealt a blow when top freshman Dwyane Wade was declared ineligible after failing to achieve a qualifying SAT/ACT score. Marquette was picked fifth in the Conference USA American division while senior guard Brian Wardle was named to the preseason all-conference team.

== Regular season ==
During the February 22, 2001 game against DePaul, Marquette held "Al McGuire night," honoring the school's Hall of Fame former coach, who had died the month before. As a part of the event, the court at the Bradley Center was renamed "Al McGuire Court."

== Roster ==
2000–01 Marquette Golden Eagles men's basketball team
Players
Coaches

Pos.	#	Name	Height	Weight	Year	Hometown
G	4	Cordell Henry	5 ft 10 in (1.78 m)	160 lb (73 kg)	Jr	Chicago, Illinois
C	35	John Mueller	6 ft 11 in (2.11 m)	232 lb (105 kg)	Sr	Cedarburg, Wisconsin
C	5	Scott Merritt	6 ft 10 in (2.08 m)	245 lb (111 kg)	Fr	Wauwatosa, Wisconsin
F	40	Terry Sanders	6 ft 8 in (2.03 m)	225 lb (102 kg)	Fr	Milwaukee, Wisconsin
G	25	Dwyane Wade (I)	6 ft 4 in (1.93 m)	210 lb (95 kg)	Fr	Chicago, Illinois
G	22	Brian Wardle	6 ft 5 in (1.96 m)	212 lb (96 kg)	Sr	Clarendon Hills, Illinois

Head coach

- Tom Crean

Assistant coach(es)

- Darrin Horn
- Tod Kowalczyk
- Dwayne Stephens

Legend

- (C) Team captain
- (S) Suspended
- (I) Ineligible
- (W) Walk-on
- Injured
- Current redshirt

Roster

== Schedule ==
Date time, TV	Rank^{#}	Opponent^{#}	Result	Record	Site city, state
November 14*		South Alabama; Tivo Preseason NIT First Round	L 54–67	0–1	Bradley Center; Milwaukee, WI
November 20*		Massachusetts	W 68–64	1–1	Bradley Center; Milwaukee, WI
December 1*		Centenary (LA)	W 66–47	2–1	Bradley Center; Milwaukee, WI
December 2*		Cal State Northridge	W 69–66	3–1	Bradley Center; Milwaukee, WI
December 7*		Minnesota	L 59–61 ^{OT}	3–2	Bradley Center; Milwaukee, WI
December 9*		Arkansas–Little Rock	W 48–46	4–2	Bradley Center; Milwaukee, WI
December 16*		at Xavier	L 59–75	4–3	Cintas Center; Cincinnati, Ohio
December 20*		Western Carolina	W 78–66	5–3	Bradley Center; Milwaukee, WI
December 23*		Wisconsin	L 47–52	5–4	Bradley Center; Milwaukee, WI
December 30*		at Dayton	L 60–61	5–5	University of Dayton Arena; Dayton, Ohio
January 6		at DePaul	W 69–49	6–5 (1–0)	Allstate Arena; Rosemont, Illinois
January 10		Cincinnati	W 47–44	7–5 (2–0)	Bradley Center; Milwaukee, WI
January 13*; 12:00 p.m., ABC		at No. 9 North Carolina	L 54–88	7–6 (2–0)	Dean Smith Center (21,750); Chapel Hill, NC
January 17		South Florida	W 72–68	8–6 (3–0)	Bradley Center; Milwaukee, WI
January 20		Charlotte	L 71–74	8–7 (3–1)	Bradley Center; Milwaukee, WI
January 24		at Saint Louis	W 73–64	9–7 (4–1)	Bradley Center; Milwaukee, WI
January 27		Tulane	W 82–57	10–7 (5–1)	Bradley Center; Milwaukee, WI
January 30		Southern Miss	L 65–78	10–8 (5–2)	Bradley Center; Milwaukee, WI
February 2		at Memphis	W 71–65	11–8 (6–2)	The Pyramid; Memphis, Tennessee
February 8		at Louisville	L 65–75	11–9 (6–3)	Freedom Hall (15,390); Louisville, Kentucky
February 11		Saint Louis	W 75–69	12–9 (7–3)	Bradley Center; Milwaukee, WI
February 14		at UAB	L 66–72	12–10 (7–4)	Bartow Arena; Birmingham, Alabama
February 18		at Cincinnati	W 66–63 ^{OT}	13–10 (8–4)	Fifth Third Arena; Cincinnati, Ohio
February 22		DePaul	W 84–64	14–10 (9–4)	Bradley Center; Milwaukee, WI
February 24		Louisville	L 74–77 ^{3OT}	14–11 (9–5)	Bradley Center (14,743); Milwaukee, WI
February 28		at Houston	L 64-66	14–12 (9–6)	Hofheinz Pavilion; Houston, Texas
March 3		at Charlotte	L 62-85	14–13 (9–7)	Dale F. Halton Arena; Charlotte, NC
Conference USA tournament
March 7		vs. Tulane; Conference USA Conference tournament	W 72–67	15–13 (10–7)	Freedom Hall; Louisville, Kentucky
March 8		vs. Memphis; Conference USA Conference tournament	L 64–71	15–14 (10–8)	Freedom Hall; Louisville, Kentucky
*Non-conference game. ^{#}Rankings from AP poll. (#) Tournament seedings in parentheses. All times are in Central Time.
