= 1998–99 Cincinnati Bearcats men's basketball team =

American college basketball season

1998–99 Cincinnati Bearcats men's basketball

Great Alaska Shootout champions Conference USA regular season champions

NCAA tournament, second round
- Conference: Conference USA

Ranking
- Coaches: No. 11
- AP: No. 11
- Record: 27–6 (12–4 C-USA)
- Head coach: Bob Huggins (10th season)
- Assistant coach: Mick Cronin (3rd season)
- Home arena: Myrl Shoemaker Center

1998–99 Conference USA men's basketball standings
	Conf.				Overall
Team	W		L	PCT	W		L	PCT
American
No. 11 Cincinnati	12	–	4	.750	27	–	6	.818
Louisville	11	–	5	.688	19	–	11	.633
No. 24 UNC Charlotte †	10	–	6	.625	23	–	11	.676
DePaul	10	–	6	.625	18	–	13	.581
Saint Louis	8	–	8	.500	15	–	16	.484
Marquette	6	–	10	.375	14	–	15	.483
National
UAB	10	–	6	.625	20	–	12	.625
South Florida	6	–	10	.375	14	–	14	.500
Southern Miss	6	–	10	.375	14	–	16	.467
Memphis	6	–	10	.375	13	–	15	.464
Tulane	6	–	10	.375	12	–	15	.444
Houston	5	–	11	.313	10	–	17	.370
† 1999 Conference USA Tournament winner Rankings from AP Poll

The 1998–99 Cincinnati Bearcats men's basketball team represented University of Cincinnati as a member of Conference USA during the 1998–99 NCAA Division I men's basketball season. The head coach was Bob Huggins, serving in his 10th year at the school. The team won the conference regular season title, but lost in the semifinals of the Conference USA tournament. Playing as No. 3 seed in the East region of the NCAA tournament, Cincinnati defeated George Mason in the opening round before being knocked off by No. 6 seed Temple in the second round. The Bearcats finished with a 27–6 record (12–4 C-USA).

== Roster ==
1998–99 Cincinnati Bearcats men's basketball team
Players
Coaches

Pos.	#	Name	Height	Weight	Year	Hometown
C	4	Kenyon Martin	6 ft 9 in (2.06 m)	230 lb (104 kg)	Jr	Saginaw, Michigan
F	5	Jermaine Tate	6 ft 9 in (2.06 m)	235 lb (107 kg)	Jr	Toledo, Ohio
G	21	Melvin Levett	6 ft 3 in (1.91 m)	210 lb (95 kg)	Sr	Cleveland, Ohio
G	22	Steve Logan	5 ft 10 in (1.78 m)	195 lb (88 kg)	Fr	Cleveland, Ohio
F	24	Ryan Fletcher	6 ft 9 in (2.06 m)	245 lb (111 kg)	Jr	Franklin, Ohio
F	32	Pete Mickeal	6 ft 6.5 in (1.99 m)	230 lb (104 kg)	Jr	Rock Island, Illinois
C	50	Donald Little	6 ft 10 in (2.08 m)	215 lb (98 kg)	Fr	Augusta, Georgia

Head coach

Bob Huggins

Assistant coach(es)

- Mick Cronin

Legend

- (C) Team captain
- (S) Suspended
- (I) Ineligible
- (W) Walk-on
- Injured
- Current redshirt

== Schedule and results ==
Date time, TV	Rank^{#}	Opponent^{#}	Result	Record	Site city, state
Regular Season
Nov 19, 1998*	No. 17	at No. 25 Rhode Island	W 70–53	1–0	Keaney Gymnasium; Kingston, Rhode Island
Nov 25, 1998*	No. 15	vs. Southern Utah; Great Alaska Shootout	W 76–63	2–0	Sullivan Arena; Anchorage, Alaska
Nov 27, 1998*	No. 15	vs. Iowa State; Great Alaska Shootout	W 60–52	3–0	Sullivan Arena; Anchorage, Alaska
Nov 28, 1998*	No. 15	vs. No. 1 Duke; Great Alaska Shootout	W 77–75	4–0	Sullivan Arena; Anchorage, Alaska
Dec 5, 1998*	No. 6	Oakland	W 106–78	5–0	Myrl Shoemaker Center; Cincinnati, Ohio
Dec 12, 1998*	No. 4	Louisiana-Lafayette	W 91–65	6–0	Myrl Shoemaker Center; Cincinnati, Ohio
Dec 14, 1998*	No. 4	Nicholls State	W 82–48	7–0	Myrl Shoemaker Center; Cincinnati, Ohio
Dec 16, 1998*	No. 4	at No. 17 Minnesota	W 62–61 ^{OT}	8–0	Williams Arena; Minneapolis, Minnesota
Dec 19, 1998*	No. 4	at UNLV	W 86–73	9–0	Thomas & Mack Center; Las Vegas, Nevada
Dec 22, 1998	No. 4	Houston	W 115–78	10–0 (1–0)	Myrl Shoemaker Center; Cincinnati, Ohio
Dec 28, 1998*	No. 4	vs. Dayton	W 53–51	11–0	Gund Arena; Cleveland, Ohio
Dec 30, 1998*	No. 3	UNC Wilmington	W 81–52	12–0	Myrl Shoemaker Center; Cincinnati, Ohio
Jan 3, 1999	No. 3	Marquette	W 75–56	13–0 (2–0)	Myrl Shoemaker Center; Cincinnati, Ohio
Jan 6, 1999	No. 3	DePaul	W 87–64	14–0 (3–0)	Myrl Shoemaker Center; Cincinnati, Ohio
Jan 9, 1999	No. 3	at Southern Miss	W 54–52	15–0 (4–0)	Reed Green Coliseum; Hattiesburg, Mississippi
Jan 14, 1999	No. 3	at UNC Charlotte	L 60–62	15–1 (4–1)	Dale F. Halton Arena; Charlotte, North Carolina
Jan 16, 1999*	No. 3	Oklahoma	W 72–59	16–1	Myrl Shoemaker Center; Cincinnati, Ohio
Jan 21, 1999	No. 5	at No. 24 Louisville	W 81–55	17–1 (5–1)	Freedom Hall; Louisville, Kentucky
Jan 23, 1999	No. 5	Saint Louis	W 55–44	18–1 (6–1)	Myrl Shoemaker Center; Cincinnati, Ohio
Jan 28, 1999*	No. 5	Xavier	W 87–77	19–1	Myrl Shoemaker Center; Cincinnati, Ohio
Jan 30, 1999	No. 5	UAB	W 73–60	20–1 (7–1)	Myrl Shoemaker Center; Cincinnati, Ohio
Feb 3, 1999	No. 3	Tulane	W 82–63	21–1 (8–1)	Myrl Shoemaker Center; Cincinnati, Ohio
Feb 6, 1999	No. 3	at DePaul	L 60–61 ^{2OT}	21–2 (8–2)	Rosemont Horizon; Rosemont, Illinois
Feb 10, 1999	No. 4	at Marquette	L 58–62	21–3 (8–3)	Bradley Center; Milwaukee, Wisconsin
Feb 14, 1999	No. 4	at Saint Louis	L 57–69	21–4 (8–4)	Kiel Center; St. Louis, Missouri
Feb 17, 1999	No. 9	UNC Charlotte	W 82–69	22–4 (9–4)	Fifth Third Arena; Cincinnati, Ohio
Feb 21, 1999	No. 9	Louisville	W 91–78	23–4 (10–4)	Fifth Third Arena; Cincinnati, Ohio
Feb 25, 1999	No. 9	at South Florida	W 64–53	24–4 (11–4)	Sun Dome; Tampa, Florida
Feb 27, 1999	No. 9	at Memphis	W 89–64	25–4 (12–4)	Pyramid Arena; Memphis, Tennessee
Conference USA Tournament
Mar 4, 1999*	No. 7	vs. South Florida; Quarterfinals	W 76–56	26–4	Birmingham-Jefferson Civic Center; Birmingham, Alabama
Mar 5, 1999*	No. 7	vs. UNC Charlotte; Semifinals	L 52–55	26–5	Birmingham-Jefferson Civic Center; Birmingham, Alabama
NCAA Tournament
Mar 12, 1999*	(3 E) No. 11	vs. (14 E) George Mason; Second Round	W 72–48	27–5	TD Garden; Boston, Massachusetts
Mar 14, 1999*	(3 E) No. 11	vs. (6 E) Temple; Second Round	L 54–64	27–6	TD Garden; Boston, Massachusetts
*Non-conference game. ^{#}Rankings from AP poll. (#) Tournament seedings in parentheses. E=East.

== Rankings ==
Ranking movements Legend: ██ Increase in ranking ██ Decrease in ranking — = Not ranked
	Week																		
Poll	Pre	1	2	3	4	5	6	7	8	9	10	11	12	13	14	15	16	17	Final
AP	15	17	15	6	4	4	4	3	3	3	5	5	3	4	9	9	7	11	Not released
Coaches	15	—	14	7	4	3	3	3	3	3	5	5	3	5	6	8	7	9	11

^Coaches did not release a Week 1 poll.
*AP did not release post-NCAA Tournament rankings

=== NBA draft selections ===
Round	Overall	Player	NBA club
2	54	Melvin Levett	Detroit Pistons
