= 2000 Maui Invitational =

College basketball tournament

2000 Maui Invitational Tournament
- Season: 2000–01
- Teams: 8
- Finals site: Lahaina Civic Center; Maui, Hawaii
- Champions: Arizona (1st title)
- Runner-up: Illinois (1st title game)
- Semifinalists: Dayton; Maryland
- Winning coach: Lute Olson (1st title)
- MVP: Michael Wright (Arizona)

The 2000 Maui Invitational Tournament was an early-season college basketball tournament that was played, for the 17th time, from November 20 to November 22, 2000. The tournament, which began in 1984, was part of the 2000–01 NCAA Division I men's basketball season. The tournament was played at the Lahaina Civic Center in Maui, Hawaii and was won by the Arizona Wildcats. It was the first title for both the program and for its head coach Lute Olson after losses in the 1993 and 1997 finals.

Every school in the tournament except for Chaminade had participated in the NCAA tournament the year before.

Six of the twelve games were broadcast on ESPN or ESPN2.

== Bracket ==
Fifth Place Game; November 21
12	Connecticut	83
Louisville	71
Seventh Place Game
Chaminade	78
UNLV	90

Consolation 2nd Round; November 20
Chaminade	61
12	Connecticut	77
Louisville	86
UNLV	85

First round November 19
Chaminade	57
1	Arizona	97
13	Connecticut	66
Dayton	80
6	Maryland	95
Louisville	73
8	Illinois	74
UNLV	69

Semifinals; November 20
1	Arizona	76
Dayton	59
6	Maryland	80
8	Illinois	90

Championship; November 21
1	Arizona	79
8	Illinois	76
Third-place game
Dayton	77
6	Maryland	71
