= 2001 Conference USA men's basketball tournament =

- Classification: Division I
- Season: 2000–01
- Teams: 12
- Site: Freedom Hall; Louisville, KY
- Champions: Charlotte (2nd title)
- Winning coach: Bobby Lutz (2nd title)
- MVP: Rodney White (Charlotte)

2000–01 Conference USA men's basketball standings
	Conf.				Overall
Team	W		L	PCT	W		L	PCT
American
Cincinnati	11	–	5	.688	25	–	10	.714
Charlotte †	10	–	6	.625	22	–	11	.667
Marquette	9	–	7	.563	15	–	14	.517
Saint Louis	8	–	8	.500	17	–	14	.548
Louisville	8	–	8	.500	12	–	19	.387
DePaul	4	–	12	.250	12	–	18	.400
National
Southern Miss	11	–	5	.688	22	–	9	.710
Memphis	10	–	6	.625	21	–	15	.583
South Florida	9	–	7	.563	18	–	13	.581
UAB	8	–	8	.500	17	–	14	.548
Houston	6	–	10	.375	9	–	20	.310
Tulane	2	–	14	.125	9	–	21	.300
† 2001 Conference USA Tournament winner Rankings from AP Poll

The 2001 Conference USA men's basketball tournament was held March 7–10 at Freedom Hall in Louisville, Kentucky.

Charlotte defeated Cincinnati in the championship game, 80–72, to clinch their second Conference USA men's tournament championship.

The 49ers, in turn, received an automatic bid to the 2001 NCAA tournament. They were joined in the tournament by fellow C-USA member Cincinnati, who earned an at-large bid.

== Format ==
There were no new changes to the tournament format. The top four teams were given byes into the quarterfinal round while the remaining eight teams were placed into the first round. All seeds were determined by overall regular season conference records.

UNC Charlotte rebranded itself as Charlotte prior to the season.

== Bracket ==
First round Wednesday, March 7
9	UAB	74
8	Louisville	61
5	Marquette	72
12	Tulane	67
11	DePaul	59
6	South Florida	63
7	Saint Louis	78
10	Houston	67

Quarterfinals; Thursday, March 8
1	Cincinnati	73
9	UAB	70
5	Marquette	64
4	Memphis	71
3	Charlotte	77
6	South Florida	74
7	Saint Louis	54
2	Southern Miss	63

Semifinals; Friday, March 9
1	Cincinnati	89
4	Memphis	79
3	Charlotte	75
2	Southern Miss	63

Championship; Saturday, March 10
1	Cincinnati	72
3	Charlotte	80
