= Bobby Lutz (basketball) =

American basketball coach (born 1958)

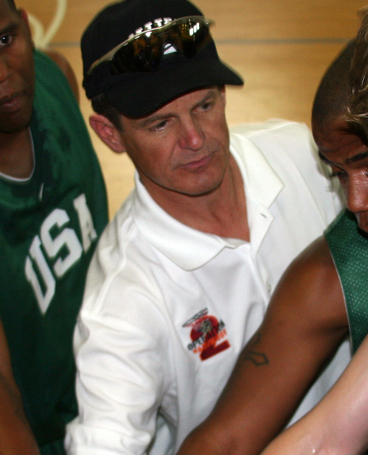
- Lutz in Kuwait, 2007

Biographical details
- Born: April 4, 1958 (age 68); Hickory, North Carolina, U.S.
- Education: University of North Carolina at Charlotte

Coaching career (HC unless noted)
- 1982–1983: Parkwood HS (NC)
- 1983–1984: Bunker Hill HS (NC)
- 1984–1986: Clemson (assistant)
- 1986–1995: Pfeiffer
- 1995–1998: Charlotte (assistant)
- 1998–2010: Charlotte
- 2010–2011: Iowa State (assistant)
- 2011–2012: NC State (assistant)
- 2012–2016: NC State (associate HC)
- 2016–2017: Windy City Bulls (assistant)
- 2019–2021: Nebraska (special assistant)

Head coaching record
- Overall: 398–247 (.617) (college)
- Tournaments: 2–5 (NCAA Division I); 13–6 (NAIA); 1–3 (NIT)

Accomplishments and honors

Championships
- 6 Conference Carolinas regular season (1990–1995); 5 Conference Carolinas tournament (1991–1995); C-USA regular season (2004); 2 C-USA tournament (1999, 2001)

Awards
- 3x Conference Carolinas Coach of the Year (1989, 1992, 1995)

Bobby Lutz (born April 4, 1958) is an American basketball coach. He last served as Associate AD for the University of Mississippi Rebels men's basketball team. From 2016 to 2017, he was an assistant coach of the Windy City Bulls of the NBA Development League. He previously was an associate head coach at North Carolina State University Wolfpack men's basketball team after being an assistant coach there. Lutz was also head coach of the Charlotte 49ers basketball team from 1998 to 2010.

== Early career ==
Lutz graduated from Bandys High School in Catawba, North Carolina in 1976 and from the University of North Carolina at Charlotte in 1980 with a B.A. in Psychology and Economics. He taught social studies and coached basketball at several high schools in North Carolina. In 1984, he became a graduate assistant coach for the men's basketball team at Clemson University. Before the 1986–87 season, he was named head coach at Pfeiffer College in Misenheimer, North Carolina. He led the Falcons to a 181–91 record in his nine years as their coach, including one berth in the NAIA championship game.

== Charlotte ==
In 1995, Lutz was named the head coach at Gardner–Webb University but resigned two weeks after accepting the job to become an assistant coach at his alma mater under head coach Jeff Mullins. He served as an assistant under Mullins (1995–96) and his successor, Melvin Watkins (1996–98). When Watkins accepted the head coaching job at Texas A&M University, Lutz was promoted and became the eighth head coach of the Charlotte 49ers on April 9, 1998.

The 49ers enjoyed consistent success during Lutz's tenure, reaching the NCAA tournament five times (1999, 2001, 2002, 2004 and 2005), plus three appearances in the NIT (2000, 2006 and 2008). In 2005, Lutz was a finalist for the Jim Phelan Award.

On February 23, 2008, Charlotte won at home over Saint Louis 81–64, giving Lutz 183 wins at Charlotte and the all-time mark for wins by a 49ers coach, passing Mullins' 182 wins accumulated between 1985 and 1996.

Lutz's 49ers were expected to contend for their first NCAA Tournament berth as an Atlantic 10 member in 2009–10. With eight games to go in the season, they had a record of 18-5 and seemed well on their way to a bid. However, they went 1-7 the rest of the way. They bottomed out in the first round of the Atlantic 10 Tournament against UMass when they came out of a timeout with six men on the court. The resulting technical foul derailed a last-ditch rally, and they lost the game. After not even receiving an NIT bid, Lutz was fired on March 15, 2010. He compiled a 218–158 record at UNC Charlotte, and is the school's winningest men's basketball coach. He then spent a season as an assistant coach with the Nebraska Cornhuskers under head coach Fred Hoiberg.

== D-League ==
On September 30, 2016, Lutz was appointed an assistant coach of the Windy City Bulls, a new NBA Development League franchise, under head coach Nate Loenser. Lutz helped Coach this team to a 23–27 record, which was good for 7th in the Eastern Conference, but only the top four teams in each conference get into the playoffs. After the 2016–17 season, Windy City Bulls head coach Nate Loenser switched jobs with Chicago Bulls assistant coach Charlie Henry and Lutz was not a part of Henry's 2017-18 staff.

== Head coaching record ==
Record table
Season	Team	Overall	Conference	Standing	Postseason
Pfeiffer Falcons (Conference Carolinas) (1986–1995)
1986–87	Pfeiffer	7–19	4–12		
1987–88	Pfeiffer	7–17	4–12		
1988–89	Pfeiffer	13–13	10–6		
1989–90	Pfeiffer	22–11	9–3	1st	NAIA Elite Eight
1990–91	Pfeiffer	29–4	10–2	T–1st	NAIA Final Four
1991–92	Pfeiffer	30–5	14–0	1st	NAIA Division I Final Four
1992–93	Pfeiffer	23–6	13–1	1st	NAIA Division I First Round
1993–94	Pfeiffer	24–6	11–3	1st	NAIA Division I Sweet 16
1994–95	Pfeiffer	25–8	11–3	T–1st	NAIA Division I Runner-up
Pfeiffer:		180–89 (.669)	86–42 (.672)		
Charlotte 49ers (Conference USA) (1998–2005)
1998–99	Charlotte	23–11	10–6	T–3rd (American)	NCAA Division I Second Round
1999–00	Charlotte	17–16	7–9	T–5th (American)	NIT First Round
2000–01	Charlotte	22–11	10–6	2nd (American)	NCAA Division I Second Round
2001–02	Charlotte	18–12	11–5	3rd (American)	NCAA Division I First Round
2002–03	Charlotte	13–16	8–8	T–5th (American)	
2003–04	Charlotte	21–9	12–4	T–1st	NCAA Division I First Round
2004–05	Charlotte	21–8	12–4	T–2nd	NCAA Division I First Round
Charlotte 49ers (Atlantic 10 Conference) (2005–2010)
2005–06	Charlotte	19–13	11–5	2nd	NIT First Round
2006–07	Charlotte	14–16	7–9	9th	
2007–08	Charlotte	20–14	9–7	T–4th	NIT First Round
2008–09	Charlotte	11–20	5–11	12th	
2009–10	Charlotte	19–12	9–7	T–5th	
Charlotte:		218–158 (.580)	111–81 (.578)		
Total:		398–247 (.617)			
National champion Postseason invitational champion Conference regular season champion Conference regular season and conference tournament champion Division regular season champion Division regular season and conference tournament champion Conference tournament champion

== Personal ==
Lutz has a wife and two daughters.
