= 2000–01 South Alabama Jaguars basketball team =

American college basketball season

2000–01 South Alabama Jaguars men's basketball

Sun Belt West division champions

NIT tournament, first round
- Conference: Sun Belt Conference
- West Division
- Record: 22–11 (11–5 Sun Belt)
- Head coach: Bob Weltlich (4th season)
- Home arena: Mitchell Center

2000–01 Sun Belt Conference men's basketball standings
| | Conf. | | | | Overall |
| Team | W | | L | PCT | W | | L | PCT |
|---|---|---|---|---|---|---|---|---|
East
| Western Kentucky † | 14 | – | 2 | .875 | 24 | – | 7 | .774 |
| Arkansas State | 10 | – | 6 | .625 | 17 | – | 13 | .567 |
| Louisiana Tech | 10 | – | 6 | .625 | 17 | – | 12 | .586 |
| Arkansas-Little Rock | 9 | – | 7 | .563 | 18 | – | 11 | .621 |
| Florida International | 5 | – | 11 | .313 | 8 | – | 21 | .276 |
| Middle Tennessee | 1 | – | 15 | .063 | 5 | – | 22 | .185 |
West
| South Alabama | 11 | – | 5 | .688 | 22 | – | 11 | .667 |
| Louisiana–Lafayette | 10 | – | 6 | .625 | 16 | – | 13 | .552 |
| New Orleans | 10 | – | 6 | .625 | 17 | – | 12 | .586 |
| New Mexico State | 10 | – | 6 | .625 | 14 | – | 14 | .500 |
| Denver | 5 | – | 11 | .313 | 10 | – | 18 | .357 |
| North Texas | 1 | – | 15 | .063 | 4 | – | 24 | .143 |
† 2001 Sun Belt Conference tournament winner Rankings from AP Poll

The 2000–01 South Alabama Jaguars basketball team represented the University of South Alabama during the 2000–01 NCAA Division I men's basketball season. The Jaguars were led by head coach Bob Weltlich, in his fourth season as head coach. They played their home games at the Mitchell Center, and were members of the Sun Belt Conference. They finished the season 22–11, 11–5 in Sun Belt play to finish in second place. They were invited to play in the NIT tournament, but lost in the first round against Toledo.

== Roster ==
2000–01 South Alabama Jaguars men's basketball team
Players
Coaches

| Pos. | # | Name | Height | Weight | Year | Hometown |
|---|---|---|---|---|---|---|
| C | | Virgil Stanescu | 6 ft 10 in (2.08 m) | — | Sr |
| G | | Ravonte Dantzler | 6 ft 2 in (1.88 m) | — | Sr |
| G | | Demetrice Williams | 6 ft 2 in (1.88 m) | — | So |
| F | | Emmett Thomas | 6 ft 4 in (1.93 m) | — | Fr |
| C | | Henry Williams | 6 ft 6 in (1.98 m) | — | Fr |
| G | | Brett Gravitt | 6 ft 3 in (1.91 m) | — | Sr |
| G | | Ericson Beck | 5 ft 11 in (1.8 m) | — | Sr |
| C | | Mike Bollman | 6 ft 6 in (1.98 m) | — | So |
| C | | Matt Forget | 7 ft 1 in (2.16 m) | — | Fr |
| G | | Akbar Stepford | 6 ft 3 in (1.91 m) | — | Sr |
| G | | Derrick Davis | 6 ft 2 in (1.88 m) | — | Fr |

Head coach

- Bob Weltlich (Ohio State)

Assistant coach(es)

Legend

- (C) Team captain
- (S) Suspended
- (I) Ineligible
- (W) Walk-on
- Injured
- Current redshirt

== Schedule and results ==
| Date time, TV | Rank^{#} | Opponent^{#} | Result | Record | Site (attendance) city, state |
Non-conference regular season
| Nov 14, 2000* | | at Marquette; Tivo Preseason NIT First Round | W 67–54 | 1–0 | Bradley Center; Milwaukee, Wisconsin |
| Nov 17, 2000*; 7:00 p.m., ESPN Plus | | at Indiana; Tivo Preseason NIT Second Round | L 62–70 | 1–1 | Assembly Hall (12,581); Bloomington, Indiana |
| Nov 21, 2000* | | Stephen F. Austin | W 73–51 | 2–1 | Mitchell Center; Mobile, Alabama |
| Nov 25, 2000* | | Sam Houston State | W 70–66 | 3–1 | Mitchell Center; Mobile, Alabama |
| Nov 28, 2000* | | at Southern Miss | L 43–54 | 3–2 | Reed Green Coliseum; Hattiesburg, Mississippi |
| Dec 1, 2000* | | at Auburn | W 68–66 | 4–2 | Beard–Eaves–Memorial Coliseum; Auburn, Alabama |
| Dec 4, 2000* | | Wright State | W 79–71 | 5–2 | Mitchell Center; Mobile, Alabama |
| Dec 9, 2000* | | at Alabama State | L 61–69 | 5–3 | Joe L. Reed Acadome; Montgomery, Alabama |
| Dec 12, 2000* | | West Florida | W 69–48 | 6–3 | Mitchell Center; Mobile, Alabama |
| Dec 16, 2000*; 6:30 p.m. | | Louisville; Coors Classic | W 72–65 | 7–3 | Mitchell Center (9,019); Mobile, Alabama |
| Dec 19, 2000* | | at Murray State | W 82–76 | 8–3 | Regional Special Events Center; Murray, Kentucky |
Sun Belt Regular Season
| Dec 23, 2000 | | Louisiana–Lafayette | L 55–67 | 8–4 (0–1) | Mitchell Center; Mobile, Alabama |
| Dec 30, 2000* | | at BYU | L 42–64 | 8–5 | Marriott Center; Provo, Utah |
| Jan 4, 2001 | | at Florida International | W 70–59 | 9–5 (1–1) | Golden Panther Arena; Miami, Florida |
| Jan 6, 2001 | | at Arkansas State | L 63–64 | 9–6 (1–2) | Convocation Center; Jonesboro, Arkansas |
| Jan 10, 2001 | | Western Kentucky | W 74–66 ^{OT} | 10–6 (2–2) | Mitchell Center (2,421); Mobile, Alabama |
| Jan 10, 2001 | | Middle Tennessee | W 72–64 | 11–6 (3–2) | Mitchell Center; Mobile, Alabama |
| Jan 17, 2001* | | Valdosta State | W 77–51 | 12–6 | Mitchell Center; Mobile, Alabama |
| Jan 21, 2001 | | New Mexico State | W 72–63 | 13–6 (4–2) | Mitchell Center; Mobile, Alabama |
| Jan 25, 2001 | | at New Orleans | L 60–73 | 13–7 (4–3) | Lakefront Arena; New Orleans, Louisiana |
| Jan 27, 2001 | | at Louisiana–Lafayette | W 58–55 | 14–7 (5–3) | Cajundome; Lafayette, Louisiana |
| Feb 1, 2001 | | Denver | W 65–61 | 15–7 (6–3) | Mitchell Center; Mobile, Alabama |
| Feb 3, 2001 | | Louisiana Tech | L 54–60 | 15–8 (6–4) | Mitchell Center; Mobile, Alabama |
| Feb 8, 2001 | | at North Texas | W 86–75 | 16–8 (7–4) | UNT Coliseum; Denton, Texas |
| Feb 10, 2001 | | at New Mexico State | W 70–66 | 17–8 (8–4) | Pan American Center; Las Cruces, New Mexico |
| Feb 14, 2001 | | at Arkansas–Little Rock | W 84–81 | 18–8 (9–4) | Alltel Arena; North Little Rock, Arkansas |
| Feb 17, 2001 | | New Orleans | L 58–67 | 18–9 (9–5) | Mitchell Center; Mobile, Alabama |
| Feb 22, 2001 | | at Denver | W 86–80 ^{2OT} | 19–9 (10–5) | Magness Arena; Denver, Colorado |
| Feb 24, 2001 | | North Texas | W 88–70 | 20–9 (11–5) | Mitchell Center; Mobile, Alabama |
Sun Belt Conference tournament
| Mar 3, 2001* | (1W) | (4E) Arkansas–Little Rock; Quarterfinals | W 85–62 | 21–9 | Mitchell Center; Mobile, Alabama |
| Mar 5, 2001* | (1W) | (2E) Arkansas State; Semifinals | W 76–53 | 22–9 | Mitchell Center; Mobile, Alabama |
| Mar 6, 2001 | (1W) | (1E) Western Kentucky; Championship | L 54–64 | 22–10 | Mitchell Center (8,069); Mobile, Alabama |
NIT tournament
| Mar 15, 2001* | | at Toledo; First round | L 67–76 ^{OT} | 22–11 | John F. Savage Hall; Toledo, Ohio |
*Non-conference game. ^{#}Rankings from AP Poll. (#) Tournament seedings in parentheses. W=West. All times are in Central Time.
