= 1998–99 Marquette Golden Eagles men's basketball team =

American college basketball season

1998–99 Marquette Golden Eagles men's basketball
- Conference: Conference USA
- Record: 14–15 (6–10 CUSA)
- Head coach: Mike Deane (5th season)
- Home arena: Bradley Center

1998–99 Conference USA men's basketball standings
	Conf.				Overall
Team	W		L	PCT	W		L	PCT
American
No. 11 Cincinnati	12	–	4	.750	27	–	6	.818
Louisville	11	–	5	.688	19	–	11	.633
No. 24 UNC Charlotte †	10	–	6	.625	23	–	11	.676
DePaul	10	–	6	.625	18	–	13	.581
Saint Louis	8	–	8	.500	15	–	16	.484
Marquette	6	–	10	.375	14	–	15	.483
National
UAB	10	–	6	.625	20	–	12	.625
South Florida	6	–	10	.375	14	–	14	.500
Southern Miss	6	–	10	.375	14	–	16	.467
Memphis	6	–	10	.375	13	–	15	.464
Tulane	6	–	10	.375	12	–	15	.444
Houston	5	–	11	.313	10	–	17	.370
† 1999 Conference USA Tournament winner Rankings from AP Poll

The 1998–99 Marquette Golden Eagles men's basketball team represented the Marquette University in the 1998–99 season. The Golden Eagles finished the regular season with a record of 14–15, 6–10 in their conference.

== Roster ==
1998–99 Marquette Golden Eagles men's basketball team
Players
Coaches

Pos.	#	Name	Height	Weight	Year	Hometown
C	45	Jarrod Lovette	6 ft 10 in (2.08 m)	245 lb (111 kg)	Sr	Blair, Wisconsin
F	32	Bart Miller	6 ft 5 in (1.96 m)	205 lb (93 kg)	Jr	Brandenburg, Kentucky
C	35	John Mueller	6 ft 11 in (2.11 m)	232 lb (105 kg)	So	Cedarburg, Wisconsin
G	22	Brian Wardle	6 ft 5 in (1.96 m)	212 lb (96 kg)	So	Clarendon Hills, Illinois

Head coach

- Mike Deane

Assistant coach(es)

Legend

- (C) Team captain
- (S) Suspended
- (I) Ineligible
- (W) Walk-on
- Injured
- Current redshirt

== Schedule ==
Date time, TV	Rank^{#}	Opponent^{#}	Result	Record	Site city, state
November 14*		at Boston College	W 70–49	1–0	Silvio O. Conte Forum; Chestnut Hill, MA
November 16*		Morgan State	W 85–51	2–0	Bradley Center; Milwaukee, Wisconsin
November 19*		vs. No. 13 Oklahoma State	L 54–57	2–1	Stan Sheriff Center; Honolulu, Hawaii
November 21*		vs. Nicholls State	W 51–48	3–1	Stan Sheriff Center; Honolulu, Hawaii
November 28*		at Dayton	L 49–81	3–2	University of Dayton Arena; Dayton, Ohio
December 1*		Northeastern	W 82–68	4–2	Bradley Center; Milwaukee, Wisconsin
December 4*		Cornell	W 68–51	5–2	Bradley Center; Milwaukee, Wisconsin
December 5*		Tulsa	L 51–67	5–3	Bradley Center; Milwaukee, Wisconsin
December 8*		UW-Milwaukee	W 77–56	6–3	Bradley Center; Milwaukee, Wisconsin
December 13		South Florida	L 63–75	6–4 (0–1)	Bradley Center; Milwaukee, Wisconsin
December 19*		Baylor	W 74–64	7–4 (0–1)	Bradley Center; Milwaukee, Wisconsin
December 23*		No. 20 Wisconsin	L 45–61	7–5 (0–1)	Bradley Center; Milwaukee, Wisconsin
December 31*		Illinois-Chicago	W 61–58	8–5 (0–1)	Bradley Center; Milwaukee, Wisconsin
January 3		at No. 3 Cincinnati	L 56–75	8–6 (0–2)	Myrl Shoemaker Center; Cincinnati, Ohio
January 6		at UAB	L 66–73 ^{OT}	8–7 (0–3)	Bartow Arena; Birmingham, Alabama
January 9		at DePaul	L 60–75	8–8 (0–4)	Rosemont Horizon; Rosemont, Illinois
January 13		Louisville	L 63–78	8–9 (0–5)	Bradley Center; Milwaukee, Wisconsin
January 16		Saint Louis	W 60–51	9–9 (1–5)	Bradley Center; Milwaukee, Wisconsin
January 19		at UNC Charlotte	L 61–67	9–10 (1–6)	Dale F. Halton Arena; Charlotte, North Carolina
January 24		DePaul	W 62–46	10–10 (2–6)	Bradley Center; Milwaukee, Wisconsin
January 28		Tulane	W 65–59	11–10 (3–6)	Bradley Center; Milwaukee, Wisconsin
January 30		at Saint Louis	L 46–48 ^{OT}	11–11 (3–7)	Kiel Center; St. Louis, Missouri
February 6		at Louisville	L 77–81	11–12 (3–8)	Freedom Hall; Louisville, Kentucky
February 10		No. 4 Cincinnati	W 62–58	12–12 (4–8)	Bradley Center; Milwaukee, Wisconsin
February 13		UNC Charlotte	W 69–59	13–12 (5–8)	Bradley Center; Milwaukee, Wisconsin
February 21		at Memphis	L 79–81	13–13 (5–9)	The Pyramid; Memphis, Tennessee
February 24		Southern Mississippi	L 50–59	13–14 (5–10)	Bradley Center; Milwaukee, Wisconsin
February 27		at Houston	W 65–62	14–14 (6–10)	Hofheinz Pavilion; Houston, Texas
Conference USA tournament
March 3	(10)	vs. (7) Saint Louis	L 52–59	14–15 (6–10)	BJCC Coliseum; Birmingham, AL
*Non-conference game. ^{#}Rankings from AP Poll. (#) Tournament seedings in parentheses. All times are in Eastern Time.
