= 2000–01 Southern Miss Golden Eagles basketball team =

American college basketball season

2000–01 Southern Miss Golden Eagles men's basketball

NIT, First Round
- Conference: Conference USA
- Record: 22–9 (11–5 C-USA)
- Head coach: James Green (5th season)
- Home arena: Reed Green Coliseum

2000–01 Conference USA men's basketball standings
	Conf.				Overall
Team	W		L	PCT	W		L	PCT
American
Cincinnati	11	–	5	.688	25	–	10	.714
Charlotte †	10	–	6	.625	22	–	11	.667
Marquette	9	–	7	.563	15	–	14	.517
Saint Louis	8	–	8	.500	17	–	14	.548
Louisville	8	–	8	.500	12	–	19	.387
DePaul	4	–	12	.250	12	–	18	.400
National
Southern Miss	11	–	5	.688	22	–	9	.710
Memphis	10	–	6	.625	21	–	15	.583
South Florida	9	–	7	.563	18	–	13	.581
UAB	8	–	8	.500	17	–	14	.548
Houston	6	–	10	.375	9	–	20	.310
Tulane	2	–	14	.125	9	–	21	.300
† 2001 Conference USA Tournament winner Rankings from AP Poll

The 2000–01 Southern Miss Golden Eagles basketball team represented University of Southern Mississippi in the 2000–01 college basketball season.

== Roster ==
2000–01 Southern Miss Golden Eagles men's basketball team
Players
Coaches

Pos.	#	Name	Height	Weight	Year	Hometown
C		Vandarel Jones	6 ft 9 in (2.06 m)	—	Sr
G		David Wall	6 ft 5 in (1.96 m)	—	Sr
F		Elvin Mims	6 ft 5 in (1.96 m)	—	Jr	Century, Florida
F		Kilavorus Thompson	6 ft 6 in (1.98 m)	—	Sr
G		Mario Myles	6 ft 5 in (1.96 m)	—	So
G		Mel Cauthen	6 ft 0 in (1.83 m)	—	Sr
G		Brad Richardson	6 ft 1 in (1.85 m)	—	Jr
G		Pete Meneses	6 ft 4 in (1.93 m)	—	Jr
G		Clement Carter	6 ft 5 in (1.96 m)	—	Fr
G		Bernard Duncan	6 ft 4 in (1.93 m)	—	Jr
F		Carlos Gill	—	—	Jr
F		Carl Henderson	6 ft 8 in (2.03 m)	—	Sr
G		Terrell Bolton	—	—	So

Head coach

- James Green

Assistant coach(es)

Legend

- (C) Team captain
- (S) Suspended
- (I) Ineligible
- (W) Walk-on
- Injured
- Current redshirt

Roster

== Schedule and results ==
Date time, TV	Rank^{#}	Opponent^{#}	Result	Record	Site city, state
Non-conference regular season
Nov 17, 2000*		vs. Louisiana Tech; John Thompson Classic	W 70–63	1–0	Bud Walton Arena; Fayetteville, Arkansas
Nov 18, 2000*; 8:30 p.m.		at No. 15 Arkansas; John Thompson Classic	W 63–54	2–0	Bud Walton Arena (16,372); Fayetteville, Arkansas
Nov 21, 2000*		Alcorn State	W 88–62	3–0	Reed Green Coliseum; Hattiesburg, Mississippi
Nov 28, 2000*		South Alabama	W 54–43	4–0	Reed Green Coliseum; Hattiesburg, Mississippi
Dec 1, 2000*		vs. Western Illinois; Tribune Cyclone Challenge	W 84–51	5–0	Hilton Coliseum; Ames, Iowa
Dec 2, 2000*; 8:00 p.m.		at Iowa State; Tribune Cyclone Challenge	L 67–69	5–1	Hilton Coliseum; Ames, Iowa
Dec 5, 2000*		Jackson State	W 90–67	6–1	Reed Green Coliseum; Hattiesburg, Mississippi
Dec 9, 2000*		at New Orleans	W 82–68	7–1	Lakefront Arena; New Orleans, Louisiana
Dec 16, 2000*		Arkansas State	W 76–71	8–1	Reed Green Coliseum; Hattiesburg, Mississippi
Dec 19, 2000*		Arkansas Tech	W 87–41	9–1	Reed Green Coliseum; Hattiesburg, Mississippi
Conference USA regular season
Dec 27, 2000		at Memphis	W 75–67	10–1 (1–0)	The Pyramid; Memphis, Tennessee
Dec 30, 2000*		at Auburn	L 69–73	10–2	Beard–Eaves–Memorial Coliseum; Auburn, Alabama
Jan 6, 2001		at South Florida	L 49–59	10–3 (1–1)	Sun Dome; Tampa, Florida
Jan 10, 2001		DePaul	W 63–49	11–3 (2–1)	Reed Green Coliseum; Hattiesburg, Mississippi
Jan 13, 2001		at UAB	W 64–52	12–3 (3–1)	Bartow Arena; Birmingham, Alabama
Jan 18, 2001*		Louisiana–Lafayette	W 76–61	13–3	Reed Green Coliseum; Hattiesburg, Mississippi
Jan 21, 2001; 6:00 p.m.		Louisville	W 69–60	14–3 (4–1)	Reed Green Coliseum (4,414); Hattiesburg, Mississippi
Jan 24, 2001		Houston	W 72–51	15–3 (5–1)	Reed Green Coliseum; Hattiesburg, Mississippi
Jan 27, 2001; 6:30 p.m.		at Charlotte	L 60–71	15–4 (5–2)	Dale F. Halton Arena; Charlotte, North Carolina
Jan 30, 2001		at Marquette	W 78–65	16–4 (6–2)	Bradley Center; Milwaukee, Wisconsin
Feb 3, 2001		UAB	L 59–71	16–5 (6–3)	Reed Green Coliseum; Hattiesburg, Mississippi
Feb 7, 2001		at Tulane	L 69–80	16–6 (6–4)	Devlin Fieldhouse; New Orleans, Louisiana
Feb 10, 2001		Cincinnati	L 52–64	16–7 (6–5)	Reed Green Coliseum; Hattiesburg, Mississippi
Feb 14, 2001		at Houston	W 62–58	17–7 (7–5)	Hofheinz Pavilion; Houston, Texas
Feb 17, 2001		at Saint Louis	W 69–67	18–7 (8–5)	Savvis Center; St. Louis, Missouri
Feb 24, 2001		Tulane	W 78–63	19–7 (9–5)	Reed Green Coliseum; Hattiesburg, Mississippi
Feb 28, 2001		Memphis	W 74–55	20–7 (10–5)	Reed Green Coliseum; Hattiesburg, Mississippi
Mar 3, 2001		South Florida	W 83–77	21–7 (11–5)	Reed Green Coliseum; Hattiesburg, Mississippi
C-USA tournament
Mar 8, 2001*	(2)	vs. (7) Saint Louis; Quarterfinals	W 63–54	22–7	Freedom Hall; Louisville, Kentucky
Mar 9, 2001*; 4:30 p.m.	(2)	vs. (3) Charlotte; Semifinals	L 63–75	22–8	Freedom Hall; Louisville, Kentucky
NIT
Mar 14, 2001*		at Mississippi State; First round	L 68–75	22–9	Humphrey Coliseum; Starkville, Mississippi
*Non-conference game. ^{#}Rankings from AP poll. (#) Tournament seedings in parentheses. All times are in Central Time.
