= 2001 Sun Belt Conference men's basketball tournament =

- Classification: Division I
- Season: 2000–01
- Teams: 11
- Site: Mitchell Center; Mobile, AL
- Champions: Western Kentucky (3rd title)
- Winning coach: Dennis Felton (1st title)
- MVP: Chris Marcus (Western Kentucky)

2000–01 Sun Belt Conference men's basketball standings
	Conf.				Overall
Team	W		L	PCT	W		L	PCT
East
Western Kentucky †	14	–	2	.875	24	–	7	.774
Arkansas State	10	–	6	.625	17	–	13	.567
Louisiana Tech	10	–	6	.625	17	–	12	.586
Arkansas-Little Rock	9	–	7	.563	18	–	11	.621
Florida International	5	–	11	.313	8	–	21	.276
Middle Tennessee	1	–	15	.063	5	–	22	.185
West
South Alabama	11	–	5	.688	22	–	11	.667
Louisiana–Lafayette	10	–	6	.625	16	–	13	.552
New Orleans	10	–	6	.625	17	–	12	.586
New Mexico State	10	–	6	.625	14	–	14	.500
Denver	5	–	11	.313	10	–	18	.357
North Texas	1	–	15	.063	4	–	24	.143
† 2001 Sun Belt Conference tournament winner Rankings from AP Poll

The 2001 Sun Belt Conference men's basketball tournament was held March 2–6 at the Mitchell Center at the University of South Alabama in Mobile, Alabama.

Top-seeded Western Kentucky defeated hosts South Alabama in the championship game, 64–54, to win their third Sun Belt men's basketball tournament.

The Hilltoppers, in turn, received an automatic bid to the 2001 NCAA tournament. No other Sun Belt members earned bids to the tournament.

== Format ==
The Sun Belt added three new teams prior to the 2000–01 season: Middle Tennessee State (Ohio Valley), New Mexico State (Big West), and North Texas (Big West). The conference's total membership increased to twelve.

The tournament field expanded once again, increasing from nine to eleven teams (NMSU did not compete). With all eleven participating Sun Belt members seeded based on regular season conference records, the five highest-seeded teams were awarded byes into the quarterfinal round while the six lowest-seeded teams entered the bracket in the preliminary first round.

== Bracket ==
First round Friday, March 2
5E	Florida International	59
4W	Denver	52
6E	Middle Tennessee	61
3W	New Orleans	66*
4E	Arkansas–Little Rock	80
5W	North Texas	67

Quarterfinals; Saturday, March 3 Sunday, March 4
1E	Western Kentucky	68
5E	Florida International	51
3E	Louisiana Tech	56
2W	Louisiana–Lafayette	63
2E	Arkansas State	82
3W	New Orleans	73
4E	Arkansas–Little Rock	62
1W	South Alabama	85

Semifinals; Monday, March 5
1E	Western Kentucky	82
2W	Louisiana–Lafayette	75
2E	Arkansas State	53
1W	South Alabama	76

Championship; Tuesday, March 6
1E	Western Kentucky	64
1W	South Alabama	54

== See also ==
- Sun Belt Conference women's basketball tournament
