= 2000–01 Saint Joseph's Hawks men's basketball team =

American college basketball season

2000–01 Saint Joseph's Hawks men's basketball
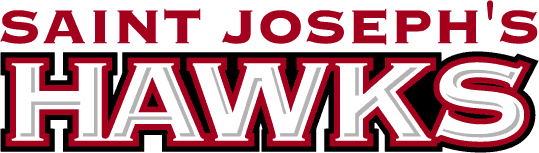

A-10 Regular season champions

NCAA tournament, Second Round
- Conference: Atlantic 10
- East

Ranking
- Coaches: No. 24
- AP: No. 22
- Record: 26–7 (14–2 Atlantic 10)
- Head coach: Phil Martelli (6th season)
- Assistant coaches: Mark Bass (2nd season); Matt Brady (8th season); Monté Ross (5th season)
- Home arena: Alumni Memorial Fieldhouse

2000–01 Atlantic 10 men's basketball standings
	Conf.				Overall
Team	W		L	PCT	W		L	PCT
No. 22 Saint Joseph's	14	–	2	.875	26	–	7	.788
Xavier	12	–	4	.750	21	–	8	.724
Temple †	12	–	4	.750	24	–	13	.649
UMass	11	–	5	.688	15	–	15	.500
Dayton	9	–	7	.563	21	–	13	.618
St. Bonaventure	9	–	7	.563	18	–	12	.600
George Washington	6	–	10	.375	14	–	18	.438
La Salle	5	–	11	.313	12	–	17	.414
Fordham	4	–	12	.250	12	–	17	.414
Duquesne	3	–	13	.188	9	–	21	.300
Rhode Island	3	–	13	.188	7	–	23	.233
† 2001 Atlantic 10 Tournament winner Rankings from AP Poll

The 2000–01 Saint Joseph's Hawks men's basketball team represented Saint Joseph's University during the 2000–01 NCAA Division I men's basketball season. Under 6th year head coach Phil Martelli, the Hawks held an overall record of 26–7 and a conference record of 14–2. In the A-10 tournament, Saint Joseph's beat La Salle before falling to UMass in the semifinals. The Hawks earned an at-large bid to the NCAA tournament – as No. 9 seed in the West region – where they beat No. 8 seed Georgia Tech in the opening round before falling to No. 1 seed Stanford in the round of 32.

== Roster ==
2000–01 Saint Joseph's Hawks men's basketball team
Players
Coaches

Pos.	#	Name	Height	Weight	Year	Previous school	Hometown
G	12	Tyrone Barley	6 ft 1 in (1.85 m)	185 lb (84 kg)	Fr	Newark, NJ
G	14	Jameer Nelson	6 ft 0 in (1.83 m)	185 lb (84 kg)	Fr	Chester HS	Chester, PA

Head coach

- Phil Martelli (Widener)

Assistant coach(es)

- Mark Bass (Saint Joseph's)
- Matt Brady (Siena)
- Monté Ross (Winston-Salem State)

Legend

- (C) Team captain
- (S) Suspended
- (I) Ineligible
- (W) Walk-on
- Injured
- Current redshirt

== Schedule and results ==
Date time, TV	Rank^{#}	Opponent^{#}	Result	Record	Site city, state
Regular season
Nov 17, 2000*; 9:00 p.m.		vs. Western Carolina; America's Youth Classic	W 103–53	1–0	Memorial Gymnasium (4,250); Nashville, Tennessee
Nov 18, 2000*		vs. South Carolina State; America's Youth Classic	W 84–71	2–0	Memorial Gymnasium (4,875); Nashville, Tennessee
Nov 19, 2000*		at Vanderbilt; America's Youth Classic	L 76–78	2–1	Memorial Gymnasium (5,200); Nashville, Tennessee
Nov 26, 2000*		at Colorado	W 92–78	3–1	Coors Events/Conference Center (3,284); Boulder, Colorado
Nov 29, 2000*		Old Dominion	W 70–65	4–1	Alumni Memorial Fieldhouse (3,200); Philadelphia, Pennsylvania
Dec 5, 2000*		at Rutgers	W 67–65	5–1	Louis Brown Athletic Center (4,427); Piscataway, New Jersey
Dec 9, 2000*		Drexel	W 68–54	6–1	Palestra (4,337); Philadelphia, Pennsylvania
Dec 11, 2000*		Villanova	L 75–78	6–2	Palestra (8,722); Philadelphia, Pennsylvania
Dec 17, 2000*		at DePaul	L 76–80	6–3	Allstate Arena (6,124); Rosemont, Illinois
Dec 21, 2000*		at Western Kentucky	W 74–68	7–3	E. A. Diddle Arena (3,100); Bowling Green, Kentucky
Dec 27, 2000*		Saint Peter's	W 79–69	8–3	Alumni Memorial Fieldhouse (3,200); Philadelphia, Pennsylvania
Dec 30, 2000*		Delaware	W 72–67	9–3	Alumni Memorial Fieldhouse (1,732); Philadelphia, Pennsylvania
Jan 3, 2001		Duquesne	W 75–60	10–3 (1–0)	Alumni Memorial Fieldhouse (3,030); Philadelphia, Pennsylvania
Jan 6, 2001		at Rhode Island	W 92–67	11–3 (2–0)	Keaney Gymnasium (2,107); Kingston, Rhode Island
Jan 10, 2001		at George Washington	W 76–71	12–3 (3–0)	Charles E. Smith Center (3,215); Washington, D.C.
Jan 14, 2001		Dayton	W 84–71	13–3 (4–0)	Alumni Memorial Fieldhouse (3,200); Philadelphia, Pennsylvania
Jan 16, 2001		at Temple	W 73–51	14–3 (5–0)	Liacouras Center (8,329); Philadelphia, Pennsylvania
Jan 20, 2001		at Xavier	L 73–86	14–4 (5–1)	Cintas Center (10,250); Cincinnati, Ohio
Jan 24, 2001		Rhode Island	W 82–67	15–4 (6–1)	Alumni Memorial Fieldhouse (2,913); Philadelphia, Pennsylvania
Jan 27, 2001*		at Penn	W 67–61	16–4	Palestra (8,722); Philadelphia, Pennsylvania
Feb 1, 2001		St. Bonaventure	W 104–97 ^{OT}	17–4 (7–1)	Alumni Memorial Fieldhouse (3,200); Philadelphia, Pennsylvania
Feb 7, 2001		No. 24 Xavier	W 79–76	18–4 (8–1)	Alumni Memorial Fieldhouse (3,200); Philadelphia, Pennsylvania
Feb 10, 2001		at St. Bonaventure	W 78–76	19–4 (9–1)	Reilly Center (6,000); St. Bonaventure, New York
Feb 13, 2001		Temple	W 71–62	20–4 (10–1)	Alumni Memorial Fieldhouse (3,200); Philadelphia, Pennsylvania
Feb 18, 2001		Fordham	W 88–78	21–4 (11–1)	Alumni Memorial Fieldhouse (3,200); Philadelphia, Pennsylvania
Feb 21, 2001	No. 23	at Dayton	W 82–72	22–4 (12–1)	UD Arena (13,553); Dayton, Ohio
Feb 25, 2001	No. 23	at Duquesne	W 90–70	23–4 (13–1)	A.J. Palumbo Center (5,575); Pittsburgh, Pennsylvania
Feb 27, 2001	No. 18	UMass	W 84–69	24–4 (14–1)	Alumni Memorial Fieldhouse (3,200); Philadelphia, Pennsylvania
Mar 3, 2001	No. 18	at La Salle	L 90–91	24–5 (14–2)	Tom Gola Arena (4,000); Philadelphia, Pennsylvania
Atlantic 10 Tournament
Mar 8, 2001*	(1) No. 21	vs. (8) La Salle; Quarterfinals	W 82–74	25–5	First Union Spectrum (7,121); Philadelphia, Pennsylvania
Mar 9, 2001*	(1) No. 21	(4) UMass; Semifinals	L 70–75	25–6	First Union Spectrum (13,796); Philadelphia, Pennsylvania
NCAA Tournament
Mar 15, 2001*	(9 W) No. 22	vs. (8 W) Georgia Tech; First Round	W 66–62	26–6	Cox Arena (9,120); San Diego, California
Mar 17, 2001*	(9 W) No. 22	vs. (1 W) No. 2 Stanford; Second Round	L 83–90	26–7	Cox Arena (11,091); San Diego, California
*Non-conference game. ^{#}Rankings from AP Poll. (#) Tournament seedings in parentheses. W=West. All times are in Eastern Time.
