= 2000–01 Temple Owls men's basketball team =

American college basketball season

2000–01 Temple Owls men's basketball

Atlantic 10 Tournament Champions

NCAA Tournament, Elite Eight
- Conference: Atlantic 10 Conference

Ranking
- Coaches: No. 16
- Record: 24–13 (12–4 A-10)
- Head coach: John Chaney (19th season)
- Assistant coach: Dan Leibovitz (5th season)
- Home arena: Liacouras Center

2000–01 Atlantic 10 men's basketball standings
	Conf.				Overall
Team	W		L	PCT	W		L	PCT
No. 22 Saint Joseph's	14	–	2	.875	26	–	7	.788
Xavier	12	–	4	.750	21	–	8	.724
Temple †	12	–	4	.750	24	–	13	.649
UMass	11	–	5	.688	15	–	15	.500
Dayton	9	–	7	.563	21	–	13	.618
St. Bonaventure	9	–	7	.563	18	–	12	.600
George Washington	6	–	10	.375	14	–	18	.438
La Salle	5	–	11	.313	12	–	17	.414
Fordham	4	–	12	.250	12	–	17	.414
Duquesne	3	–	13	.188	9	–	21	.300
Rhode Island	3	–	13	.188	7	–	23	.233
† 2001 Atlantic 10 Tournament winner Rankings from AP Poll

The 2000–01 Temple Owls men's basketball team represented Temple University in the 2000–01 NCAA Division I men's basketball season. They were led by head coach John Chaney in his 19th year. The Owls played their home games at the Liacouras Center. The Owls were members of the Atlantic 10 Conference. After winning the Atlantic 10 tournament, Temple received an automatic bid to the NCAA tournament where they made it to the Elite Eight, before losing to Michigan State. Temple finished the season 24–13, 12–4 in A-10 play.

== Roster ==
2000–01 Temple Owls men's basketball team
Players
Coaches

Pos.	#	Name	Height	Weight	Year	Hometown
F	1	Greg Jefferson	6 ft 5 in (1.96 m)	220 lb (100 kg)	So	Los Angeles, California
G	14	Lynn Greer	6 ft 1 in (1.85 m)	175 lb (79 kg)	Jr	Philadelphia, Pennsylvania
F	23	Alex Wesby	6 ft 6 in (1.98 m)	195 lb (88 kg)	So	Philadelphia, Pennsylvania
G	33	Quincy Wadley	6 ft 4 in (1.93 m)	195 lb (88 kg)	Sr	Harrisburg, Pennsylvania
G	34	David Hawkins	6 ft 5 in (1.96 m)	215 lb (98 kg)	Fr	Washington, D.C.
F	42	Kevin Lyde	6 ft 10 in (2.08 m)	260 lb (118 kg)	Jr	Washington, D.C.

Head coach

- John Chaney

Assistant coach(es)

Legend

- (C) Team captain
- (S) Suspended
- (I) Ineligible
- (W) Walk-on
- Injured
- Current redshirt

Roster

== Schedule and results ==
Date time, TV	Rank^{#}	Opponent^{#}	Result	Record	Site (attendance) city, state
Regular season
Nov 13, 2000*		Delaware; Preseason NIT	W 56–49	1–0	Liacouras Center; Philadelphia, PA
Nov 15, 2000*		New Mexico; Preseason NIT	W 61–49	2–0	Liacouras Center; Philadelphia, PA
Nov 17, 2000*		at Memphis; Preseason NIT	W 67–62	3–0	Pyramid Arena; Memphis, TN
Nov 22, 2000*; ESPN		vs. Indiana; Preseason NIT	W 69–61	4–0	Madison Square Garden; New York, NY
Nov 24, 2000*; ESPN		vs. No. 1 Duke; Preseason NIT	L 61–63	4–1	Madison Square Garden (12,989); New York, NY
Nov 30, 2000*	No. 17	at Miami (OH)	L 58–66	4–2	Millett Hall; Oxford, OH
Dec 2, 2000*	No. 17	No. 1 Duke	L 68–93	4–3	First Union Spectrum; Philadelphia, PA
Dec 5, 2000*		at Villanova	L 62–69	4–4	Philadelphia, PA
Dec 9, 2000*		at Penn State	L 60–66	4–5	Bryce Jordan Center; University Park, PA
Dec 14, 2000*		No. 16 Wisconsin	L 58–66	4–6	Liacouras Center; Philadelphia, PA
Dec 21, 2000*		No. 6 Wake Forest	L 65–73	4–7	Liacouras Center; Philadelphia, PA
Dec 23, 2000*		Cleveland State	W 73–46	5–7	Liacouras Center; Philadelphia, PA
Dec 29, 2000*		at Penn	W 74–60	6–7	The Palestra; Philadelphia, PA
Jan 4, 2001		at La Salle	W 75–61	7–7 (1–0)	Tom Gola Arena; Philadelphia, PA
Jan 6, 2001		St. Bonaventure	W 63–43	8–7 (2–0)	Liacouras Center; Philadelphia, PA
Jan 11, 2001		at Dayton	W 68–58	9–7 (3–0)	UD Arena; Dayton, OH
Jan 13, 2001		Fordham	W 77–70	10–7 (4–0)	Liacouras Center; Philadelphia, PA
Jan 16, 2001		Saint Joseph's	L 51–73	10–8 (4–1)	Liacouras Center (8,329); Philadelphia, PA
Jan 20, 2001*		at DePaul	L 64–65	10–9	Allstate Arena; Rosemont, IL
Jan 23, 2001		at Fordham	W 90–72	11–9 (5–1)	Rose Hill Gymnasium; Bronx, New York
Jan 27, 2001		UMass	L 64–65 ^{OT}	11–10 (5–2)	Liacouras Center; Philadelphia, PA
Feb 1, 2001		at Duquesne	W 84–58	12–10 (6–2)	A.J. Palumbo Center; Pittsburgh, Pennsylvania
Feb 4, 2001		Rhode Island	W 77–47	13–10 (7–2)	Liacouras Center; Philadelphia, PA
Feb 8, 2001		George Washington	W 91–58	14–10 (8–2)	Liacouras Center; Philadelphia, PA
Feb 10, 2001		at No. 24 Xavier	L 71–78	14–11 (8–3)	Cintas Center; Cincinnati, OH
Feb 13, 2001		at St. Joseph's	L 62–71	14–12 (8–4)	Alumni Memorial Fieldhouse; Philadelphia, PA
Feb 17, 2001		at UMass	W 84–52	15–12 (9–4)	Mullins Center; Amherst, MA
Feb 24, 2001		Dayton	W 70–62	16–12 (10–4)	Liacouras Center; Philadelphia, PA
Feb 28, 2001		La Salle	W 60–58	17–12 (11–4)	Liacouras Center; Philadelphia, PA
Mar 3, 2001		at George Washington	W 92–88 ^{OT}	18–12 (12–4)	Charles E. Smith Center; Washington, D.C.
Atlantic 10 tournament
Mar 8, 2001*	(3)	vs. (6) Dayton; Quarterfinal	W 76–63	19–12	First Union Spectrum; Philadelphia, Pennsylvania
Mar 9, 2001*	(3)	vs. (7) George Washington; Semifinal	W 77–76	20–12	First Union Spectrum; Philadelphia, Pennsylvania
Mar 10, 2001*	(3)	vs. (4) UMass; Championship game	W 76–65	21–12	First Union Spectrum; Philadelphia, Pennsylvania
NCAA tournament
Mar 16, 2001*; CBS	(11 S)	vs. (6 S) No. 18 Texas; First Round	W 79–65	22–12	Louisiana Superdome; New Orleans, LA
Mar 18, 2001*; CBS	(11 S)	vs. (3 S) No. 8 Florida; Second Round	W 75–54	23–12	Louisiana Superdome; New Orleans, LA
Mar 23, 2001*; CBS	(11 S)	vs. (7 S) Penn State; Sweet Sixteen	W 84–72	24–12	Georgia Dome; Atlanta, GA
Mar 25, 2001*; 2:40 pm, CBS	(11 S)	vs. (1 S) No. 2 Michigan State; Elite Eight	L 62–69	24–13	Georgia Dome (25,995); Atlanta, GA
*Non-conference game. ^{#}Rankings from AP Poll. (#) Tournament seedings in parentheses. S=South. All times are in Eastern Time.
