= 2000–01 Charlotte 49ers men's basketball team =

American college basketball season

2000–01 Charlotte 49ers men's basketball
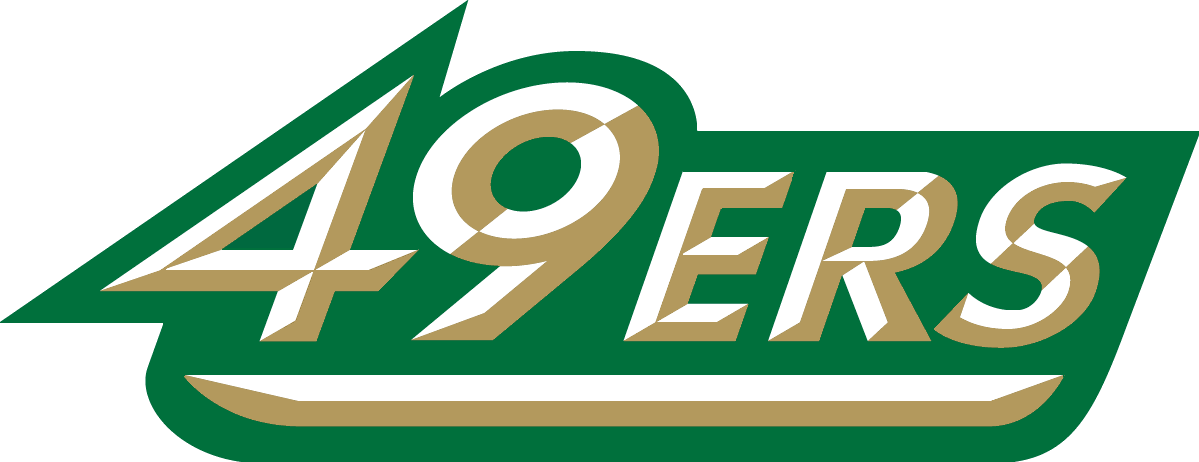

Conference USA tournament champions

NCAA tournament, Second round
- Conference: Conference USA
- Record: 22–11 (10–6 C-USA)
- Head coach: Bobby Lutz (3rd season)
- Assistant coach: Benny Moss (1st season)
- Home arena: Dale F. Halton Arena

2000–01 Conference USA men's basketball standings
	Conf.				Overall
Team	W		L	PCT	W		L	PCT
American
Cincinnati	11	–	5	.688	25	–	10	.714
Charlotte †	10	–	6	.625	22	–	11	.667
Marquette	9	–	7	.563	15	–	14	.517
Saint Louis	8	–	8	.500	17	–	14	.548
Louisville	8	–	8	.500	12	–	19	.387
DePaul	4	–	12	.250	12	–	18	.400
National
Southern Miss	11	–	5	.688	22	–	9	.710
Memphis	10	–	6	.625	21	–	15	.583
South Florida	9	–	7	.563	18	–	13	.581
UAB	8	–	8	.500	17	–	14	.548
Houston	6	–	10	.375	9	–	20	.310
Tulane	2	–	14	.125	9	–	21	.300
† 2001 Conference USA Tournament winner Rankings from AP Poll

The 2000–01 UNC Charlotte 49ers men's basketball team represented the University of North Carolina at Charlotte during the 2000–01 college basketball season. This was head coach Bobby Lutz's third season at the school. The 49ers competed in Conference USA and played their home games at Dale F. Halton Arena. They finished the season 22–11 (10–6 in C-USA play) and received an at-large bid to the 2001 NCAA tournament as No. 9 seed in the Midwest region. The 49ers defeated No. 8 seed Tennessee, 70–63, in the opening round before falling to No. 1 seed Illinois in the round of 32.

== Roster ==
2000–01 Charlotte 49ers men's basketball team
Players
Coaches

Pos.	#	Name	Height	Weight	Year	Previous school	Hometown
G	1	James Zimmerman	6 ft 5 in (1.96 m)	—	Sr	High Point Central	High Point, North Carolina
F	3	KenKay Jones	6 ft 9 in (2.06 m)	—	Sr	Harnett Central	Lillington, North Carolina
C	3	Jermaine Williams	6 ft 10 in (2.08 m)	—	Jr	South Garland	Dallas, Texas
F	5	Rodney White	6 ft 9 in (2.06 m)	230 lb (104 kg)	Fr	Newport Prep	Philadelphia, Pennsylvania
F/C	10	Cam Stephens	6 ft 8 in (2.03 m)	—	Jr	Fort Wayne South	Fort Wayne, Indiana
G	11	Demon Brown	6 ft 1 in (1.85 m)	195 lb (88 kg)	So	Maine Central School	Baltimore, Maryland
F	12	Butter Johnson	6 ft 8 in (2.03 m)	—	Fr	Milford Academy	Bronx, New York
F	12	Matas Niparavicius	6 ft 9 in (2.06 m)	—	Fr		Elektrenai, Lithuania
G	21	Diego Guevara	6 ft 2 in (1.88 m)	—	Sr	Redemption Academy	Valencia, Venezuela
G	22	Johnathan Williams	6 ft 2 in (1.88 m)	—	So	South Brunswick	Bolivia, North Carolina
G	25	Dee Tolliver	6 ft 4 in (1.93 m)	—	Sr	Oak Hill Academy	Garner, North Carolina
G	31	Jobey Thomas	6 ft 4 in (1.93 m)	195 lb (88 kg)	Jr	Independence	Charlotte, North Carolina
F	40	David Hardy	6 ft 7 in (2.01 m)	—	Fr	Central Cabarrus	Harrisburg, North Carolina
C	50	Malik El-Tamer	6 ft 10 in (2.08 m)	—	Jr		Cologne, Germany
F	55	Tory Reed	6 ft 8 in (2.03 m)	—	Fr	Maine Central School	Cleveland, Ohio

Head coach

- Bobby Lutz

Assistant coach(es)

- Benny Moss (Pfeiffer)

Legend

- (C) Team captain
- (S) Suspended
- (I) Ineligible
- (W) Walk-on
- Injured
- Current redshirt

Roster

== Schedule and results ==
Date time, TV	Rank^{#}	Opponent^{#}	Result	Record	Site city, state
Regular season
Nov 17, 2000*; 9:20 p.m.		vs. Fordham; CoSIDA Classic	W 89–75	1–0	Reynolds Coliseum; Raleigh, North Carolina
Nov 18, 2000*; 9:20 p.m.		at NC State; CoSIDA Classic	W 95–78	2–0	Reynolds Coliseum; Raleigh, North Carolina
Nov 25, 2000*; 4:00 p.m.		at St. Bonaventure	L 78–79	2–1	Reilly Center; St. Bonaventure, New York
Nov 28, 2000*; 7:30 p.m.		Miami (FL)	W 95–63	3–1	Dale F. Halton Arena; Charlotte, North Carolina
Dec 2, 2000*; 7:30 p.m.		South Carolina	W 98–77	4–1	Dale F. Halton Arena; Charlotte, North Carolina
Dec 6, 2000*; 8:05 p.m.		Charleston Southern	W 88–46	5–1	Dale F. Halton Arena; Charlotte, North Carolina
Dec 9, 2000*; 7:30 p.m.		at Davidson	W 69–53	6–1	John M. Belk Arena; Davidson, North Carolina
Dec 16, 2000*; 3:00 p.m.	No. 24	at Indiana	L 72–76	6–2	Assembly Hall; Bloomington, Indiana
Dec 20, 2000*; 9:05 p.m.		at UTEP	W 94–81	7–2	Don Haskins Center; El Paso, Texas
Dec 29, 2000*; 8:00 p.m.		vs. Pepperdine; AZCentral Holiday Classic	L 70–81	7–3	Wells Fargo Arena; Tempe, Arizona
Dec 30, 2000*		at Arizona State; AZCentral Holiday Classic	L 78–91	7–4	Wells Fargo Arena; Tempe, Arizona
Jan 3, 2001*; 7:30 p.m.		George Washington	W 84–73	8–4	Dale F. Halton Arena; Charlotte, North Carolina
Jan 6, 2001; 6:05 p.m.		at No. 25 Cincinnati	L 66–76	8–5 (0–1)	Myrl Shoemaker Center; Cincinnati, Ohio
Jan 10, 2001; 7:30 p.m.		South Florida	L 71–78	8–6 (0–2)	Dale F. Halton Arena; Charlotte, North Carolina
Jan 13, 2001; 7:30 p.m.		Saint Louis	L 56–69	8–7 (0–3)	Dale F. Halton Arena; Charlotte, North Carolina
Jan 17, 2001; 8:30 p.m.		at DePaul	W 73–62	9–7 (1–3)	Allstate Arena; Rosemont, Illinois
Jan 20, 2001; 3:00 p.m.		at Marquette	W 74–71	10–7 (2–3)	Bradley Center; Milwaukee, Wisconsin
Jan 24, 2001; 8:00 p.m.		at UAB	L 61–81	10–8 (2–4)	Bartow Arena; Birmingham, Alabama
Jan 27, 2001; 7:30 p.m.		Southern Miss	W 71–60	11–8 (3–4)	Dale F. Halton Arena; Charlotte, North Carolina
Feb 1, 2001; 9:00 p.m.		Cincinnati	W 60–58	12–8 (4–4)	Dale F. Halton Arena; Charlotte, North Carolina
Feb 4, 2001		at Houston	L 72–73	12–9 (4–5)	Hofheinz Pavilion; Houston, Texas
Feb 11, 2001; 9:00 p.m.		at Louisville	W 106–72	13–9 (5–5)	Freedom Hall; Louisville, Kentucky
Feb 14, 2001; 8:00 p.m.		at Tulane	W 98–93 ^{OT}	14–9 (6–5)	Devlin Fieldhouse; New Orleans, Louisiana
Feb 17, 2001; 3:00 p.m.		Memphis	W 83–76	15–9 (7–5)	Dale F. Halton Arena; Charlotte, North Carolina
Feb 21, 2001; 7:30 p.m.		Louisville	W 74–68	16–9 (8–5)	Dale F. Halton Arena; Charlotte, North Carolina
Feb 25, 2001; 7:00 p.m.		at Saint Louis	L 70–85	16–10 (8–6)	Savvis Center; St. Louis, Missouri
Feb 28, 2001; 7:30 p.m.		DePaul	W 90–66	17–10 (9–6)	Dale F. Halton Arena; Charlotte, North Carolina
Mar 3, 2001; 1:00 p.m.		Marquette	W 85–62	18–10 (10–6)	Dale F. Halton Arena; Charlotte, North Carolina
C-USA tournament
Mar 8, 2001*; 1:00 p.m.	(3)	vs. (6) South Florida; Quarterfinals	W 77–74	19–10	Freedom Hall; Louisville, Kentucky
Mar 9, 2001*; 5:30 p.m.	(3)	vs. (2) Southern Miss; Semifinals	W 75–63	20–10	Freedom Hall; Louisville, Kentucky
Mar 10, 2001*; 12:00 p.m.	(3)	vs. (1) Cincinnati; Championship game	W 80–72	21–10	Freedom Hall; Louisville, Kentucky
NCAA tournament
Mar 16, 2001*; 2:45 p.m.	(9 MW)	vs. (8 MW) Tennessee; First round	W 70–63	22–10	University of Dayton Arena; Dayton, Ohio
Mar 18, 2001*; 2:45 p.m., CBS	(9 MW)	vs. (1 MW) No. 4 Illinois; Second round	L 61–79	22–11	University of Dayton Arena (13,159); Dayton, Ohio
*Non-conference game. ^{#}Rankings from AP poll. (#) Tournament seedings in parentheses. MW=Midwest. All times are in Eastern Time.

== Players in the 2001 NBA draft ==
Round	Pick	Player	NBA Club
1	9	Rodney White	Detroit Pistons
