= Benny Moss =

American basketball player and coach

Current position
- Title: Head Coach
- Team: Gaston College

Biographical details
- Born: April 18, 1970 (age 56); Winston-Salem, North Carolina

Playing career
- 1989–1991: Charlotte
- 1991–1993: Pfeiffer

Coaching career (HC unless noted)
- 1993–1996: Pfeiffer (assistant)
- 1996–1998: Phillips (assistant)
- 1998–2000: Henderson State (assistant)
- 2000–2006: Charlotte (assistant)
- 2006–2010: UNC Wilmington
- 2011–2023: Coastal Carolina (assistant)
- 2023–2024: Coastal Carolina (interim HC)
- 2024-present: Gaston College

Head coaching record
- Overall: 47–91 (.341)

Benny Moss (born April 18, 1970) is an American former basketball player and coach.

Born in Winston-Salem, North Carolina, Moss received his bachelor's and master's degrees at UNC Charlotte where he played for coach Jeff Mullins. He began his coaching career in 1993 as an assistant at Pfeiffer University near Charlotte. He also served as an assistant coach at Phillips University and Henderson State University before returning to Charlotte in 2000 where he served as an assistant coach at Charlotte under Bobby Lutz for six seasons before taking the helm at UNCW. On January 28, 2010, Moss was reassigned at UNCW.

== Head coaching record ==
Record table
Season	Team	Overall	Conference	Standing	Postseason
UNC Wilmington Seahawks (Colonial Athletic Association) (2006–2010)
2006–07	UNC Wilmington	7–22	4–14	T–10th	
2007–08	UNC Wilmington	20–13	12–6	T–2nd	
2008–09	UNC Wilmington	7–25	3–15	12th	
2009–10	UNC Wilmington	7–14	3–7	12th	
UNC Wilmington:		41–74 (.357)	22–42 (.344)		
Coastal Carolina Chanticleers (Sun Belt Conference) (2023–2024)
2023–24	Coastal Carolina	6–17	5–13	13th	
Coastal Carolina:		6–17 (.261)	5–13 (.278)		
Total:		47–91 (.341)			
National champion Postseason invitational champion Conference regular season champion Conference regular season and conference tournament champion Division regular season champion Division regular season and conference tournament champion Conference tournament champion

name = Gaston College

}} overall = 12–1 (.923)
