= 1998–99 UAB Blazers men's basketball team =

American college basketball season

1998–99 UAB Blazers men's basketball

C-USA National division champions

NCAA tournament, 1st round
- Conference: Conference USA
- National
- Record: 20–12 (10–6 C-USA)
- Head coach: Murry Bartow (3rd season)
- Assistant coach: Andy Kennedy (3rd season)
- Home arena: Bartow Arena

1998–99 Conference USA men's basketball standings
| | Conf. | | | | Overall |
| Team | W | | L | PCT | W | | L | PCT |
|---|---|---|---|---|---|---|---|---|
American
| No. 11 Cincinnati | 12 | – | 4 | .750 | 27 | – | 6 | .818 |
| Louisville | 11 | – | 5 | .688 | 19 | – | 11 | .633 |
| No. 24 UNC Charlotte † | 10 | – | 6 | .625 | 23 | – | 11 | .676 |
| DePaul | 10 | – | 6 | .625 | 18 | – | 13 | .581 |
| Saint Louis | 8 | – | 8 | .500 | 15 | – | 16 | .484 |
| Marquette | 6 | – | 10 | .375 | 14 | – | 15 | .483 |
National
| UAB | 10 | – | 6 | .625 | 20 | – | 12 | .625 |
| South Florida | 6 | – | 10 | .375 | 14 | – | 14 | .500 |
| Southern Miss | 6 | – | 10 | .375 | 14 | – | 16 | .467 |
| Memphis | 6 | – | 10 | .375 | 13 | – | 15 | .464 |
| Tulane | 6 | – | 10 | .375 | 12 | – | 15 | .444 |
| Houston | 5 | – | 11 | .313 | 10 | – | 17 | .370 |
† 1999 Conference USA Tournament winner Rankings from AP Poll

The 1998–99 UAB Blazers men's basketball team represented the University of Alabama at Birmingham as a member of Conference USA during the 1998–99 NCAA Division I men's basketball season. This was head coach Murry Bartow's third season at UAB, with the Blazers playing their home games at Bartow Arena.

They finished the season 20–12, 10–6 in C-USA play and lost in the semifinals of the 1994 GMWC tournament. They received an at-large bid to the NCAA tournament as No. 12 seed in the West region. The Blazers were defeated by No. 5 seed Iowa, 77–64.

== Roster ==
1998–99 UAB Blazers men's basketball team
Players
Coaches

| Pos. | # | Name | Height | Weight | Year | Previous school | Hometown |
|---|---|---|---|---|---|---|---|
| F | 15 | Bill Armstrong | 6 ft 1 in (1.85 m) | 185 lb (84 kg) | So | Oneonta HS | Oneonta, Alabama |
| F | 22 | Fred Williams | 6 ft 8 in (2.03 m) | 220 lb (100 kg) | Sr | | Queens, New York |

Head coach

- Murry Bartow

Assistant coach(es)

- Andy Kennedy (UAB)

Legend

- (C) Team captain
- (S) Suspended
- (I) Ineligible
- (W) Walk-on
- Injured
- Current redshirt

Roster

== Schedule and results ==
| Date time, TV | Rank^{#} | Opponent^{#} | Result | Record | Site (attendance) city, state |
Regular season
| Nov 14, 1998* | | Alcorn State | W 70–54 | 1–0 | Bartow Arena (4,883); Birmingham, Alabama |
| Nov 18, 1998* | | at No. 21 Indiana | L 54–91 | 1–1 | Assembly Hall (16,678); Bloomington, Indiana |
| Nov 22, 1998* | | Tulsa | W 78–61 | 2–1 | Bartow Arena (3,516); Birmingham, Alabama |
| Nov 24, 1998* | | Cleveland State | W 89–58 | 3–1 | Bartow Arena (4,176); Birmingham, Alabama |
| Nov 29, 1998* | | at South Alabama | W 74–60 | 4–1 | Jaguar Gym (850); Mobile, Alabama |
| Dec 1, 1998* | | UT Arlington | W 94–63 | 5–1 | Bartow Arena (4,101); Birmingham, Alabama |
| Dec 5, 1998* | | at Western Kentucky | W 87–72 | 6–1 | E. A. Diddle Arena (3,100); Bowling Green, Kentucky |
| Dec 8, 1998* | | Jacksonville State | W 79–59 | 7–1 | Bartow Arena (4,276); Birmingham, Alabama |
| Dec 12, 1998* | | Auburn; Arby's Hardwood Classic | L 64–77 | 7–2 | BJCC Coliseum (14,719); Birmingham, Alabama |
| Dec 15, 1998* | | Princeton | L 57–69 | 7–3 | Bartow Arena (4,613); Birmingham, Alabama |
| Dec 21, 1998* | | vs. Ohio State; Puerto Rico Holiday Classic | L 64–71 | 7–4 | Eugene Guerra Sports Complex (75); San Juan, Puerto Rico |
| Dec 22, 1998* | | vs. Middle Tennessee; Puerto Rico Holiday Classic | W 85–60 | 8–4 | Eugene Guerra Sports Complex (89); San Juan, Puerto Rico |
| Dec 23, 1998* | | vs. Saint Joseph's; Puerto Rico Holiday Classic | W 72–58 | 9–4 | Eugene Guerra Sports Complex (N/A); San Juan, Puerto Rico |
| Dec 30, 1998 | | at Tulane | W 88–78 | 10–4 (1–0) | Avron B. Fogelman Arena (1,182); New Orleans, Louisiana |
| Jan 2, 1999 | | at Memphis | W 91–83 | 11–4 (2–0) | Pyramid Arena (13,813); Memphis, Tennessee |
| Jan 6, 1999 | | Marquette | W 73–66 ^{OT} | 12–4 (3–0) | Bartow Arena (4,976); Birmingham, Alabama |
| Jan 9, 1999 | | Houston | W 116–78 | 13–4 (4–0) | Bartow Arena (7,469); Birmingham, Alabama |
| Jan 14, 1999 | | at DePaul | L 80–87 | 13–5 (4–1) | Rosemont Horizon (6,393); Rosemont, Illinois |
| Jan 16, 1999 | | at South Florida | W 67–64 | 14–5 (5–1) | Sun Dome (5,108); Tampa, Florida |
| Jan 21, 1999 | | Tulane | L 64–80 | 14–6 (5–2) | Bartow Arena (5,919); Birmingham, Alabama |
| Jan 24, 1999 | | UNC Charlotte | W 78–71 | 15–6 (6–2) | Bartow Arena (5,483); Birmingham, Alabama |
| Jan 30, 1999 | | at No. 5 Cincinnati | L 60–73 | 15–7 (6–3) | Myrl Shoemaker Center (13,176); Cincinnati, Ohio |
| Feb 4, 1999 | | at Houston | W 90–82 | 16–7 (7–3) | Hofheinz Pavilion (8,479); Houston, Texas |
| Feb 7, 1999 | | Southern Miss | W 63–50 | 17–7 (8–3) | Bartow Arena (4,831); Birmingham, Alabama |
| Feb 11, 1999 | | Memphis | L 75–78 | 17–8 (8–4) | Bartow Arena (5,855); Birmingham, Alabama |
| Feb 15, 1999 | | South Florida | L 53–75 | 17–9 (8–5) | Bartow Arena (4,522); Birmingham, Alabama |
| Feb 20, 1999 | | at Southern Miss | W 70–61 | 18–9 (9–5) | Reed Green Coliseum (3,591); Hattiesburg, Mississippi |
| Feb 25, 1999 | | at Louisville | L 60–91 | 18–10 (9–6) | Freedom Hall (19,784); Louisville, Kentucky |
| Feb 27, 1999 | | Saint Louis | W 62–57 | 19–10 (10–6) | Bartow Arena (3,922); Birmingham, Alabama |
C-USA tournament
| Mar 4, 1999* | (3) | (6) DePaul; Quarterfinals | W 79–73 | 20–10 | BJCC Coliseum (11,058); Birmingham, Alabama |
| Mar 5, 1999* | (3) | (2) Louisville; Semifinals | L 68–77 | 20–11 | BJCC Coliseum (12,559); Birmingham, Alabama |
NCAA tournament
| Mar 11, 1999* | (12 W) | vs. (5 W) No. 21 Iowa; First round | L 64–77 | 20–12 | McNichols Sports Arena (16,637); Denver, Colorado |
*Non-conference game. ^{#}Rankings from AP poll. (#) Tournament seedings in parentheses. W=West. All times are in Central Time.
