= 2000–01 Western Kentucky Hilltoppers basketball team =

American college basketball season

2000–01 Western Kentucky Hilltoppers basketball

Sun Belt Conference tournament Champion Sun Belt Conference East Division Champion

NCAA Tournament, first round
- Conference: Sun Belt Conference
- East Division
- Record: 24–7 (14–2 Sun Belt)
- Head coach: Dennis Felton
- Assistant coach: Pete Herrmann
- Home arena: E. A. Diddle Arena

2000–01 Sun Belt Conference men's basketball standings
| | Conf. | | | | Overall |
| Team | W | | L | PCT | W | | L | PCT |
|---|---|---|---|---|---|---|---|---|
East
| Western Kentucky † | 14 | – | 2 | .875 | 24 | – | 7 | .774 |
| Arkansas State | 10 | – | 6 | .625 | 17 | – | 13 | .567 |
| Louisiana Tech | 10 | – | 6 | .625 | 17 | – | 12 | .586 |
| Arkansas-Little Rock | 9 | – | 7 | .563 | 18 | – | 11 | .621 |
| Florida International | 5 | – | 11 | .313 | 8 | – | 21 | .276 |
| Middle Tennessee | 1 | – | 15 | .063 | 5 | – | 22 | .185 |
West
| South Alabama | 11 | – | 5 | .688 | 22 | – | 11 | .667 |
| Louisiana–Lafayette | 10 | – | 6 | .625 | 16 | – | 13 | .552 |
| New Orleans | 10 | – | 6 | .625 | 17 | – | 12 | .586 |
| New Mexico State | 10 | – | 6 | .625 | 14 | – | 14 | .500 |
| Denver | 5 | – | 11 | .313 | 10 | – | 18 | .357 |
| North Texas | 1 | – | 15 | .063 | 4 | – | 24 | .143 |
† 2001 Sun Belt Conference tournament winner Rankings from AP Poll

The 2000–01 Western Kentucky Hilltoppers men's basketball team represented Western Kentucky University during the 2000–01 NCAA Division I men's basketball season. The Hilltoppers were led by coach Dennis Felton and Sun Belt Conference Player of the Year Chris Marcus. The team won the East Division Championship and the Sun Belt Basketball tournament, earning an automatic bid to the 2001 NCAA Division I men's basketball tournament. Marcus was SBC tournament MVP and conference Defensive Player of the Year for the second consecutive year. Nashon McPherson joined Marcus on the SBC All-Tournament team.

== Schedule ==
| Date time, TV | Rank^{#} | Opponent^{#} | Result | Record | Site city, state |
Regular season
| 11/18/2000* | | at Evansville | W 61–59 | 1–0 | Roberts Municipal Stadium (7,904); Evansville, IN |
| 11/21/2000* | | Union (KY) | W 75–45 | 2–0 | E. A. Diddle Arena (2,500); Bowling Green, KY |
| 11/25/2000* | | Tennessee State | W 90–66 | 3–0 | E. A. Diddle Arena (3,500); Bowling Green, KY |
| 11/28/2000* | | Vanderbilt; Area Bank Classic | L 66–70 | 3–1 | E. A. Diddle Arena (7,500); Bowling Green, KY |
| 12/2/2000* | | at New Mexico | L 57–75 | 3–2 | The Pit (arena) (16,518); Albuquerque, NM |
| 12/5/2000* | | at Murray State | L 81–83 | 3–3 | CFSB Center (3,927); Murray, KY |
| 12/9/2000* | | at Louisville | W 68–65 | 4–3 | Freedom Hall (18,427); Louisville, KY |
| 12/16/2000* | | Akron | W 73–58 | 5–3 | E. A. Diddle Arena (3,000); Bowling Green, KY |
| 12/18/2000* | | Savannah State | W 103–60 | 6–3 | E. A. Diddle Arena (2,100); Bowling Green, KY |
| 12/21/2000* | | Saint Joseph's (PA) | L 68–74 | 6–4 | E. A. Diddle Arena (3,100); Bowling Green, KY |
| 12/28/2000 | | at New Orleans | W 68–63 | 7–4 (1-0) | Lakefront Arena (697); New Orleans, LA |
| 12/31/2000 | | at Denver | W 80–61 | 8–4 (2-0) | Magness Arena (433); Denver, CO |
| 1/3/2001* | | Asbury (KY) | W 81–29 | 9–4 | E. A. Diddle Arena (2,400); Bowling Green, KY |
| 1/6/2001 | | Louisiana–Lafayette | W 79–62 | 10–4 (3-0) | E. A. Diddle Arena (4,800); Bowling Green, KY |
| 1/10/2001 | | at South Alabama | L 66–74 ^{OT} | 10–5 (3-1) | Mitchell Center (2,421); Mobile, AL |
| 1/13/2001 | | Arkansas–Little Rock | W 59–49 | 11–5 (4-1) | E. A. Diddle Arena (4,800); Bowling Green, KY |
| 1/16/2001 | | New Mexico State | W 72–61 | 12–5 (5-1) | E. A. Diddle Arena (3,000); Bowling Green, KY |
| 1/18/2001 | | Louisiana Tech | W 55–47 | 13–5 (6-1) | E. A. Diddle Arena (3,300); Bowling Green, KY |
| 1/25/2001 | | Arkansas State | W 79–61 | 14–5 (7-1) | E. A. Diddle Arena (4,400); Bowling Green, KY |
| 1/27/2001 | | at FIU | W 55–46 | 15–5 (8-1) | Ocean Bank Convocation Center (685); University Park, FL |
| 2/1/2001 | | at Middle Tennessee | W 71–63 | 16–5 (9-1) | Murphy Center (2,437); Murfreesboro, TN |
| 2/3/2001 | | North Texas | W 107–63 | 17–5 (10-1) | E. A. Diddle Arena (5,400); Bowling Green, KY |
| 2/10/2001 | | at Louisiana Tech | L 72–73 ^{OT} | 17–6 (10-2) | Thomas Assembly Center (2,879); Ruston, LA |
| 2/15/2001 | | FIU | W 69–49 | 18–6 (11-2) | E. A. Diddle Arena (3,500); Bowling Green, KY |
| 2/17/2001 | | at Arkansas–Little Rock | W 86–73 | 19–6 (12-2) | Alltel Arena (5,912); North Little Rock, AR |
| 2/22/2001 | | at Arkansas State | W 100–60 | 20–6 (13-2) | Convocation Center (6,539); Jonesboro, AR |
| 2/24/2001 | | Middle Tennessee | W 92–51 | 21–6 (14-2) | E. A. Diddle Arena (6,800); Bowling Green, KY |
2001 Sun Belt Conference men's basketball tournament
| 3/3/2001 | (E1) | (E5) FIU; Second Round | W 68–51 | 22–6 | Mitchell Center (4,975); Mobile, AL |
| 3/5/2001 | (E1) | (W2) Louisiana–Lafayette; Semifinals | W 82–75 | 23–6 | Mitchell Center (6,128); Mobile, AL |
| 3/6/2001 | (E1) | at (W1) South Alabama; Championship | W 64–54 | 24–6 | Mitchell Center (8,069); Mobile, AL |
2001 NCAA Division I men's basketball tournament
| 3/16/2001* | (14 S) | vs. (3 S) No. 8 Florida; First Round | L 56–69 | 24–7 | Louisiana Superdome (10,948); New Orleans, LA |
*Non-conference game. ^{#}Rankings from AP Poll (S#) during NCAA Tournament is seed with Region. (#) Tournament seedings in parentheses.
