= 2001 Atlantic 10 men's basketball tournament =

- Classification: Division I
- Season: 2000–01
- Teams: 11
- Site: First Union Spectrum; Philadelphia
- Champions: Temple (6th title)
- Winning coach: John Chaney (6th title)
- MVP: Lynn Greer (Temple)

2000–01 Atlantic 10 men's basketball standings
	Conf.				Overall
Team	W		L	PCT	W		L	PCT
No. 22 Saint Joseph's	14	–	2	.875	26	–	7	.788
Xavier	12	–	4	.750	21	–	8	.724
Temple †	12	–	4	.750	24	–	13	.649
UMass	11	–	5	.688	15	–	15	.500
Dayton	9	–	7	.563	21	–	13	.618
St. Bonaventure	9	–	7	.563	18	–	12	.600
George Washington	6	–	10	.375	14	–	18	.438
La Salle	5	–	11	.313	12	–	17	.414
Fordham	4	–	12	.250	12	–	17	.414
Duquesne	3	–	13	.188	9	–	21	.300
Rhode Island	3	–	13	.188	7	–	23	.233
† 2001 Atlantic 10 Tournament winner Rankings from AP Poll

The 2001 Atlantic 10 men's basketball tournament was played from March 7 to March 10, 2001, at the Spectrum in Philadelphia, Pennsylvania. The winner was named champion of the Atlantic 10 Conference and received an automatic bid to the 2001 NCAA Men's Division I Basketball Tournament. With eleven teams in the conference following the departure of Virginia Tech, the top five teams in the conference received a first-round bye in the tournament. Temple won the tournament for the second year in a row. Saint Joseph's and Xavier also received bids to the NCAA Tournament. In addition, St. Bonaventure and Dayton received bids to the 2001 National Invitation Tournament. Lynn Greer of Temple was named the tournament's Most Outstanding Player.

== Bracket ==
First round Wednesday, March 7
8	La Salle	86
9	Fordham	67
7	George Washington	88
10	Duquesne	65
6	Dayton	85
11	Rhode Island	59

Quarterfinals; Thursday, March 8
1	#21 Saint Joseph's	82
8	La Salle	74
4	UMass	79
5	St. Bonaventure	58
2	Xavier	74
7	George Washington	83
3	Temple	76
6	Dayton	63

Semifinals; Friday, March 9
1	#21 Saint Joseph's	70
4	UMass	75
7	George Washington	76
3	Temple	77

Final; Saturday, March 10
4	UMass	65
3	Temple	76

All games played at The Spectrum, Philadelphia, Pennsylvania
* – Overtime
