= 2000–01 Xavier Musketeers men's basketball team =

American college basketball season

2000–01 Xavier Musketeers men's basketball

NCAA tournament, first round
- Conference: Atlantic 10 Conference
- Record: 21–8 (12–4 A10)
- Head coach: Skip Prosser (7th season)
- Assistant coach: Dino Gaudio
- Home arena: Cintas Center

2000–01 Atlantic 10 men's basketball standings
	Conf.				Overall
Team	W		L	PCT	W		L	PCT
No. 22 Saint Joseph's	14	–	2	.875	26	–	7	.788
Xavier	12	–	4	.750	21	–	8	.724
Temple †	12	–	4	.750	24	–	13	.649
UMass	11	–	5	.688	15	–	15	.500
Dayton	9	–	7	.563	21	–	13	.618
St. Bonaventure	9	–	7	.563	18	–	12	.600
George Washington	6	–	10	.375	14	–	18	.438
La Salle	5	–	11	.313	12	–	17	.414
Fordham	4	–	12	.250	12	–	17	.414
Duquesne	3	–	13	.188	9	–	21	.300
Rhode Island	3	–	13	.188	7	–	23	.233
† 2001 Atlantic 10 Tournament winner Rankings from AP Poll

The 2000–01 Xavier Musketeers men's basketball team represented Xavier University from Cincinnati, Ohio during the 2000–01 season. Led by head coach Skip Prosser, the Musketeers finished 21–8 (12–4 A10) in the regular season, and won the Atlantic 10 tournament. In the NCAA tournament, the Musketeers were beaten by No. 6 seed Notre Dame in the opening round.

== Roster ==
2000–01 Xavier Musketeers men's basketball team
Players
Coaches

Pos.	#	Name	Height	Weight	Year	Hometown
G	0	Lionel Chalmers	6 ft 0 in (1.83 m)	180 lb (82 kg)	Fr	Albany, New York
G	10	Romain Sato	6 ft 5 in (1.96 m)	205 lb (93 kg)	Fr
PF	30	David West	6 ft 9 in (2.06 m)	235 lb (107 kg)	So

Head coach

- Thad Matta (Butler)

Assistant coach(es)

Legend

- (C) Team captain
- (S) Suspended
- (I) Ineligible
- (W) Walk-on
- Injured
- Current redshirt

== Schedule and results ==
Date time, TV	Rank^{#}	Opponent^{#}	Result	Record	Site city, state
Regular season
Dec 2, 2000*		at No. 23 Wisconsin	L 46–61	4–1	Kohl Center; Madison, Wisconsin
Dec 9, 2000*		at Princeton	L 52–58	5–2	Jadwin Gymnasium; Princeton, New Jersey
Dec 14, 2000*		at No. 17 Cincinnati	W 69–67	6–2	Myrl H. Shoemaker Center; Cincinnati, Ohio
Dec 16, 2000*		Marquette	W 75–59	7–2	Cintas Center; Cincinnati, Ohio
Feb 10, 2001	No. 24	Temple	W 78–71	18–4 (9–2)	Cintas Center; Cincinnati, Ohio
Atlantic 10 Tournament
Mar 8, 2001*		vs. George Washington; Quarterfinals	L 74–83	21–7	The Spectrum; Philadelphia, Pennsylvania
NCAA Tournament
Mar 16, 2001*	(11 MW)	vs. (6 MW) No. 19 Notre Dame; First round	L 71–83	21–8	Kemper Arena; Kansas City, Missouri
*Non-conference game. ^{#}Rankings from AP poll. (#) Tournament seedings in parentheses. MW=Midwest.
