= 2000–01 Louisville Cardinals men's basketball team =

American college basketball season

2000–01 Louisville Cardinals men's basketball
- Conference: Conference USA
- Record: 12–19 (8–8 CUSA)
- Head coach: Denny Crum (30th season)
- Home arena: Freedom Hall

2000–01 Conference USA men's basketball standings
	Conf.				Overall
Team	W		L	PCT	W		L	PCT
American
Cincinnati	11	–	5	.688	25	–	10	.714
Charlotte †	10	–	6	.625	22	–	11	.667
Marquette	9	–	7	.563	15	–	14	.517
Saint Louis	8	–	8	.500	17	–	14	.548
Louisville	8	–	8	.500	12	–	19	.387
DePaul	4	–	12	.250	12	–	18	.400
National
Southern Miss	11	–	5	.688	22	–	9	.710
Memphis	10	–	6	.625	21	–	15	.583
South Florida	9	–	7	.563	18	–	13	.581
UAB	8	–	8	.500	17	–	14	.548
Houston	6	–	10	.375	9	–	20	.310
Tulane	2	–	14	.125	9	–	21	.300
† 2001 Conference USA Tournament winner Rankings from AP Poll

The 2000–01 Louisville Cardinals men's basketball team represented the University of Louisville in the 2000–01 NCAA Division I men's basketball season, the university's 87th season of intercollegiate competition. The head coach was Denny Crum and the team finished the season with an overall record of 12–19. It was Crum's last season as head coach of Louisville, ending the longest tenure of any Louisville head basketball coach. Crum also became the winningest coach of the Louisville basketball team during his 30-year coaching career, with 675 wins. Rick Pitino replaced Crum after the season ended.

== Regular season ==
The Cardinals began their regular season on November 17 with an 86–71 win over Hawaii. However, the Cardinals went on a five-game losing streak from November 22 until an 86–70 win over Loyola (Chicago) ended the streak on December 18. They won again on December 21 by a score of 89–86 over Murray State but lost the next four games between December 23 and January 10, 2001. The Cardinals never won more than two games in a row, with their largest losses coming against Alabama by a score of 100–71 on November 30, and against Charlotte by a score of 106–72 on February 11.

== Postseason ==
On Wednesday March 7, 2001, the Cardinals played UAB for the first round of the Conference USA tournament. Led by Murry Bartow, the Blazers defeated the Cardinals 71–64, leaving the Cardinals with a final record of 12–19 The Cardinals did not play in the NCAA Tournament.

== Schedule and results ==
Date time, TV	Rank^{#}	Opponent^{#}	Result	Record	High points	High rebounds	High assists	Site (attendance) city, state
Regular Season
Nov 17, 2000*; 1:00 am		at Hawai'i	W 86–71	1–0	25 – Maybin	5 – Tied	5 – Gaines	Stan Sheriff Center (6,776); Honolulu, Hawai'i
Nov 20, 2000*; 9:00 pm		vs. No. 6 Maryland; Maui Invitational – First Round	L 73–95	1–1	22 – Gaines	6 – Tied	4 – Brooks	Lahaina Civic Center (2,500); Lahaina, Hawai'i
Nov 21, 2000*; 4:00 pm		vs. UNLV; Maui Invitational – Consolation Round	W 86–85 ^{OT}	2–1	21 – Maybin	10 – Myles	4 – Gaines	Lahaina Civic Center (2,500); Lahaina, Hawai'i
Nov 22, 2000*; 3:30 pm		vs. No. 12 UConn; Maui Invitational – Fifth Place Game	L 71–83	2–2	25 – Maybin	5 – Tied	4 – Myles	Lahaina Civic Center (2,500); Lahaina, Hawai'i
Nov 30, 2000*; 8:00 pm		at Alabama	L 71–100	2–3	20 – Maybin	8 – Tied	2 – Tied	Coleman Coliseum (13,375); Tuscaloosa, Alabama
Dec 5, 2000*; 7:00 pm		Georgetown	L 63–70	2–4	28 – Maybin	11 – Myles	3 – Tied	Freedom Hall (18,586); Louisville, Kentucky
Dec 9, 2000*; 2:00 pm		Western Kentucky	L 65–68	2–5	22 – Maybin	5 – Myles	7 – Gaines	Freedom Hall (18,427); Louisville, Kentucky
Dec 16, 2000*; 7:30 pm		at South Alabama; Coors Classic	L 65–72	2–6	15 – Maybin	7 – Tied	3 – Myles	Mitchell Center (9,019); Mobile, Alabama
Dec 18, 2000*; 7:30 pm		Loyola–Chicago	W 86–70	3–6	26 – Gaines	7 – Tied	6 – Gaines	Freedom Hall (10,206); Louisville, Kentucky
Dec 21, 2000*; 7:30 pm		Murray State	W 89–86	4–6	30 – Maybin	9 – Myles	4 – Tied	Freedom Hall (17,871); Louisville, Kentucky
Dec 23, 2000*; 2:00 pm		Dayton	L 68–91	4–7	13 – Northern	8 – Myles	6 – Gaines	Freedom Hall (18,739); Louisville, Kentucky
Dec 30, 2000*; 7:00 pm		Oregon	L 65–88	4–8	17 – Gaines	8 – Lasege	3 – Maybin	Freedom Hall (16,917); Louisville, Kentucky
Jan 2, 2001*; 7:00 pm		Kentucky; Rivalry	L 62–64	4–9	27 – Gaines	8 – Gaines	4 – Gaines	Freedom Hall (20,061); Louisville, Kentucky
Jan 6, 2001; 2:10 pm		at Saint Louis	L 61–71	4–10 (0–1)	22 – Maybin	6 – Myles	4 – Whitehead	St. Louis, Missouri (12,237); Savvis Center
Jan 10, 2001; 8:00 pm		at Tulane	W 87–84 ^{OT}	5–10 (1–1)	28 – Gaines	8 – Myles	4 – Gaines	Fogelman Arena (3,069); New Orleans, Louisiana
Jan 13, 2001; 3:00 pm		Cincinnati	L 52–72	5–11 (1–2)	16 – Brooks	7 – Myles	4 – Brooks	Freedom Hall (19,892); Louisville, Kentucky
Jan 17, 2001; 7:30 pm		Houston	W 79–67	6–11 (2–2)	20 – Gaines	5 – N'Sima	8 – Gaines	Freedom Hall (17,214); Louisville, Kentucky
Jan 21, 2001; 7:00 pm		at Southern Miss	L 60–69	6–12 (2–3)	17 – Maybin	6 – N'Sima	3 – Tied	Reed Green Coliseum (4,414); Hattiesburg, Mississippi
Jan 24, 2001; 8:05 pm		at Cincinnati	W 63–54	7–12 (3–3)	19 – Maybin	6 – Tied	4 – Maybin	Shoemaker Center (13,176); Cincinnati, Ohio
Jan 27, 2001; 3:00 pm		DePaul	W 73–63	8–12 (4–3)	30 – Maybin	9 – N'Sima	4 – N'Sima	Freedom Hall (17,437); Louisville, Kentucky
Jan 31, 2001; 7:30 pm		at South Florida	L 67–73	8–13 (4–4)	28 – Maybin	9 – Maybin	5 – Brooks	Sun Dome (5,343); Tampa, Florida
Feb 3, 2001; 2:00 pm		Saint Louis	L 51–72	8–14 (4–5)	20 – Maybin	10 – N'Sima	3 – Northern	Freedom Hall (18,521); Louisville, Kentucky
Feb 8, 2001; 9:00 pm		Marquette	W 75–65	9–14 (5–5)	14 – Brooks	8 – N'Sima	3 – Gaines	Freedom Hall (15,390); Louisville, Kentucky
Feb 11, 2001; 9:00 pm		Charlotte	L 72–106	9–15 (5–6)	15 – Tied	8 – N'Sima	5 – Northern	Freedom Hall (15,156); Louisville, Kentucky
Feb 14, 2001; 8:30 pm		at DePaul	W 71–62	10–15 (6–6)	17 – Tied	8 – Gaines	4 – Brooks	Allstate Arena; Rosemont, Illinois
Feb 17, 2001*; 1:00 pm		at Utah	L 67–84	10–16	13 – Maybin	5 – Tied	3 – Gaines	Huntsman Center (12,171); Salt Lake City, Utah
Feb 21, 2001; 7:30 pm		at Charlotte	L 68–74	10–17 (6–7)	22 – Maybin	8 – Myles	5 – Myles	Halton Arena (6,325); Charlotte, North Carolina
Feb 24, 2001; 8:00 pm		at Marquette	W 77–74 ^{3OT}	11–17 (7–7)	22 – Maybin	10 – N'Sima	7 – Northern	Bradley Center (14,743); Milwaukee, Wisconsin
Feb 27, 2001; 8:00 pm		UAB	L 57–74	11–18 (7–8)	17 – Gaines	9 – N'Sima	4 – Gaines	Freedom Hall (17,305); Louisville, Kentucky
Mar 3, 2001; 3:00 pm		Memphis	W 65–56	12–18 (8–8)	23 – Gaines	5 – N'Sima	2 – Tied	Freedom Hall (19,920); Louisville, Kentucky
Conference USA Tournament
Mar 7, 2001*; 7:00 pm	(8)	vs. (9) UAB; First Round	L 61–74	12–19	21 – Brooks	8 – Myles	3 – Brooks	Freedom Hall (17,675); Louisville, Kentucky
*Non-conference game. ^{#}Rankings from AP Poll. (#) Tournament seedings in parentheses. All times are in Eastern Time.

== Awards ==
Louisville distributed the following awards at the end of the season:

Peck Hickman Most Valuable Player Award
Marques Maybin
Most Improved Player
Rashad Brooks
Most Three Points Awards
Reece Gaines
Most Assists Awards
Reece Gaines
Best Defensive Player
Joseph N'Sima
Best First-Year Player
Joseph N'Sima
Rebound Award
Joseph N'Sima
Best Field Goal Percentage Award
Hajj Turner
Best Free-Throw Percentage
Erik Brown
Scholar-Athlete Award
Muhammed Lasege
Most Inspirational Player Award
Bryant Northern
Coaches' Award
Simeon Naydenov

== Coaching change ==
At the end of the season, coach Denny Crum retired from coaching the Cardinals, with the original announcement coming on March 2, 2001. The soon-to-be coach Rick Pitino visited the campus on March 14, 2001. He held his first press conference on March 23, 2001, at 6:30 PM EDT. On April 17, a rally was held commemorating the new head coach. Two days later, Pitino completed the basketball staff.
