= 1999 Conference USA men's basketball tournament =

Sports event

- Classification: Division I
- Season: 1998–99
- Teams: 12
- Site: Birmingham–Jefferson Convention Complex; Birmingham, AL
- Champions: UNC Charlotte (1st title)
- Winning coach: Bobby Lutz (1st title)
- MVP: Galen Young (UNC Charlotte)

1998–99 Conference USA men's basketball standings
	Conf.				Overall
Team	W		L	PCT	W		L	PCT
American
No. 11 Cincinnati	12	–	4	.750	27	–	6	.818
Louisville	11	–	5	.688	19	–	11	.633
No. 24 UNC Charlotte †	10	–	6	.625	23	–	11	.676
DePaul	10	–	6	.625	18	–	13	.581
Saint Louis	8	–	8	.500	15	–	16	.484
Marquette	6	–	10	.375	14	–	15	.483
National
UAB	10	–	6	.625	20	–	12	.625
South Florida	6	–	10	.375	14	–	14	.500
Southern Miss	6	–	10	.375	14	–	16	.467
Memphis	6	–	10	.375	13	–	15	.464
Tulane	6	–	10	.375	12	–	15	.444
Houston	5	–	11	.313	10	–	17	.370
† 1999 Conference USA Tournament winner Rankings from AP Poll

The 1999 Conference USA men's basketball tournament was held March 3–6 at the Birmingham–Jefferson Convention Complex in Birmingham, Alabama.

UNC Charlotte upset Louisville in the championship game, 68–59, to clinch their first Conference USA men's tournament championship.

The 49ers, in turn, received an automatic bid to the 1999 NCAA tournament. They were joined in the tournament by fellow C-USA members UAB, Cincinnati, and Louisville, who all earned at-large bids.

== Format ==
There were no new changes to the tournament format. The top four teams (in particular, the top two teams from the conference's two divisions: America and National) were given byes into the quarterfinal round while the remaining eight teams were placed into the first round. All seeds were determined by overall regular season conference records.

== Bracket ==
First round Wednesday, March 3
9	South Florida	88
8	Memphis	81
5	UNC Charlotte	75
12	Houston	51
7	Saint Louis	59
10	Marquette	52
6	DePaul	95
11	Tulane	59

Quarterfinals; Thursday, March 4
1	#7 Cincinnati	76
9	South Florida	56
5	UNC Charlotte	83
4	Southern Miss	75
2	Louisville	70
7	Saint Louis	61
6	DePaul	73
3	UAB	79

Semifinals; Friday, March 5
1	#7 Cincinnati	52
5	UNC Charlotte	55
2	Louisville	77
3	UAB	68

Championship; Saturday, March 6
5	UNC Charlotte	68
2	Louisville	59
