= 1998–99 UNC Charlotte 49ers men's basketball team =

American college basketball season

1998–99 UNC Charlotte 49ers men's basketball
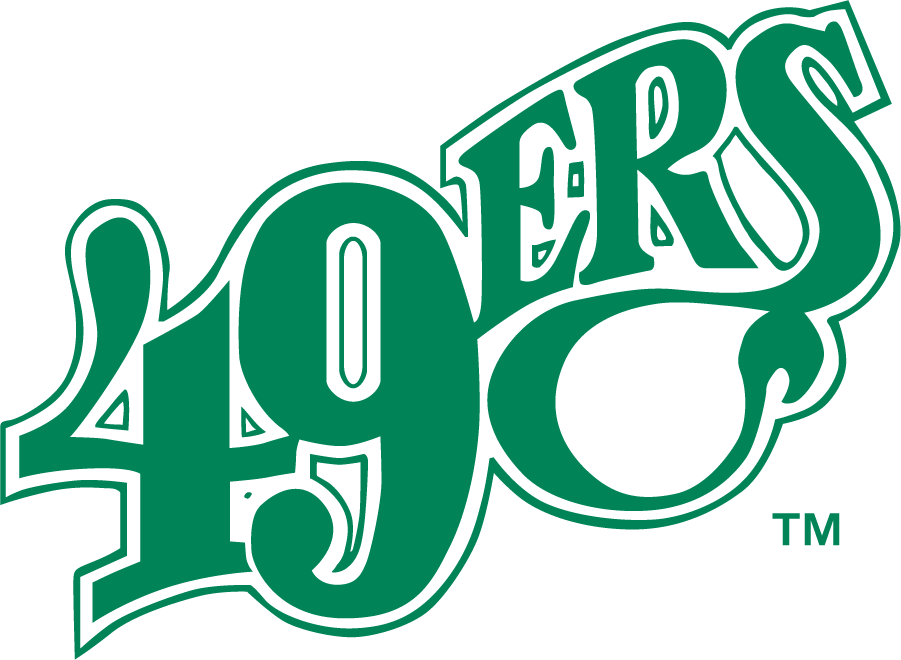

Conference USA Tournament champions

NCAA tournament, Second round
- Conference: Conference USA
- American

Ranking
- AP: No. 24
- Record: 23–11 (10–6 C-USA)
- Head coach: Bobby Lutz (1st season)
- Home arena: Dale F. Halton Arena

1998–99 Conference USA men's basketball standings
	Conf.				Overall
Team	W		L	PCT	W		L	PCT
American
No. 11 Cincinnati	12	–	4	.750	27	–	6	.818
Louisville	11	–	5	.688	19	–	11	.633
No. 24 UNC Charlotte †	10	–	6	.625	23	–	11	.676
DePaul	10	–	6	.625	18	–	13	.581
Saint Louis	8	–	8	.500	15	–	16	.484
Marquette	6	–	10	.375	14	–	15	.483
National
UAB	10	–	6	.625	20	–	12	.625
South Florida	6	–	10	.375	14	–	14	.500
Southern Miss	6	–	10	.375	14	–	16	.467
Memphis	6	–	10	.375	13	–	15	.464
Tulane	6	–	10	.375	12	–	15	.444
Houston	5	–	11	.313	10	–	17	.370
† 1999 Conference USA Tournament winner Rankings from AP Poll

The 1998–99 UNC Charlotte 49ers men's basketball team represented the University of North Carolina at Charlotte in the 1998–99 college basketball season. This was head coach Bobby Lutz's first season at the school. The 49ers competed in Conference USA and played their home games at Dale F. Halton Arena. They finished the season 23–11 (10–6 in C-USA play) and received an at-large bid to the 1999 NCAA tournament as No. 5 seed in the Midwest region. The 49ers defeated No. 12 seed Rhode Island in the opening round before losing to No. 13 seed Oklahoma, 85–72, in the round of 32.

== Roster ==
1998–99 Charlotte 49ers men's basketball team
Players	Coaches
Pos. / # / Name / Height / Weight / Year / Hometown; F / 5 / Galen Young / 6 ft 7 in (2.01 m) / 215 lb (98 kg) / Sr / Memphis, Tennessee	Head coach: Bobby Lutz; Assistant coach(es) Legend: (C) Team captain; (S) Suspended; (I) Ineligible; (W) Walk-on; Injured; Current redshirt; Roster

== Schedule and results ==
Date time, TV	Rank^{#}	Opponent^{#}	Result	Record	Site city, state
Regular season
Dec 12, 1998*		at No. 7 North Carolina	L 73–75 ^{OT}	6–3	Dean Smith Center; Chapel Hill, North Carolina
C-USA tournament
Mar 3, 1999*		vs. Houston; First Round	W 75–51	19–10	Birmingham-Jefferson Civic Center; Birmingham, Alabama
Mar 4, 1999*		vs. Southern Miss; Quarterfinals	W 83–75	20–10	Birmingham-Jefferson Civic Center; Birmingham, Alabama
Mar 5, 1999*		vs. No. 7 Cincinnati; Semifinals	W 55–52	21–10	Birmingham-Jefferson Civic Center; Birmingham, Alabama
Mar 6, 1999*		vs. Louisville; Championship game	W 68–59	22–10	Birmingham-Jefferson Civic Center; Birmingham, Alabama
NCAA tournament
Mar 12, 1999*	(5 MW) No. 24	vs. (12 MW) Rhode Island; First Round	W 81–70 ^{OT}	23–10	Bradley Center; Milwaukee, Wisconsin
Mar 14, 1999*	(5 MW) No. 24	vs. (13 MW) Oklahoma; Second Round	L 72–85	23–11	Bradley Center; Milwaukee, Wisconsin
*Non-conference game. ^{#}Rankings from AP poll. (#) Tournament seedings in parentheses. MW=Midwest.
