= 1998–99 Louisville Cardinals men's basketball team =

American college basketball season

1998–99 Louisville Cardinals men's basketball

NCAA tournament, Round of 64
- Conference: Conference USA
- Record: 19–11 (11–5 CUSA)
- Head coach: Denny Crum (28th season)
- Home arena: Freedom Hall

1998–99 Conference USA men's basketball standings
	Conf.				Overall
Team	W		L	PCT	W		L	PCT
American
No. 11 Cincinnati	12	–	4	.750	27	–	6	.818
Louisville	11	–	5	.688	19	–	11	.633
No. 24 UNC Charlotte †	10	–	6	.625	23	–	11	.676
DePaul	10	–	6	.625	18	–	13	.581
Saint Louis	8	–	8	.500	15	–	16	.484
Marquette	6	–	10	.375	14	–	15	.483
National
UAB	10	–	6	.625	20	–	12	.625
South Florida	6	–	10	.375	14	–	14	.500
Southern Miss	6	–	10	.375	14	–	16	.467
Memphis	6	–	10	.375	13	–	15	.464
Tulane	6	–	10	.375	12	–	15	.444
Houston	5	–	11	.313	10	–	17	.370
† 1999 Conference USA Tournament winner Rankings from AP Poll

The 1998–99 Louisville Cardinals men's basketball team represented the University of Louisville in the 1998–99 NCAA Division I men's basketball season. The head coach was Denny Crum and the team finished the season with an overall record of 19–11.

== Schedule and results ==
Date time, TV	Rank^{#}	Opponent^{#}	Result	Record	Site (attendance) city, state
Regular season
Nov 22, 1998*		Western Kentucky	W 99–78	1–0	Freedom Hall; Louisville, KY
Dec 5, 1998*		at Ole Miss	L 69–88	1–1	Tad Smith Coliseum; Oxford, MS
Dec 7, 1998		Towson	W 106–73	2–1	Freedom Hall; Louisville, KY
Dec 17, 1998*		at No. 7 North Carolina	L 72–77	2–2	Dean Smith Center; Chapel Hill, NC
Dec 19, 1998		DePaul	W 90–63	3–2 (1–0)	Freedom Hall; Louisville, KY
Dec 21, 1998*		at Dayton	W 68–65	4–2	UD Arena; Dayton, OH
Dec 26, 1998*		No. 3 Kentucky; Rivalry	W 83–74	5–2	Freedom Hall; Louisville, KY
Dec 30, 1998*		Morgan State	W 95–47	6–2	Freedom Hall; Louisville, KY
Jan 2, 1999*		at No. 13 Michigan State	L 57–69	6–3	Breslin Center; East Lansing, MI
Jan 6, 1999		Saint Louis	W 93–70	7–3 (2–0)	Freedom Hall; Louisville, KY
Jan 10, 1999		at South Florida	W 95–74	8–3 (3–0)	USF Sun Dome; Tampa, FL
Jan 13, 1999		at Marquette	W 78–63	9–3 (4–0)	Bradley Center; Milwaukee, WI
Jan 17, 1999		at DePaul	W 71–68	10–3 (5–0)	Rosemont Horizon; Rosemont, IL
Jan 21, 1999	No. 24	No. 5 Cincinnati	L 55–81	10–4 (5–1)	Freedom Hall; Louisville, KY
Jan 23, 1999*	No. 24	No. 13 UCLA	L 70–82	10–5	Freedom Hall; Louisville, KY
Jan 28, 1999		at Saint Louis	L 52–62	10–6 (5–2)	Kiel Center; St. Louis, MO
Jan 30, 1999		UNC Charlotte	L 49–58	10–7 (5–3)	Freedom Hall; Louisville, KY
Feb 4, 1999		Memphis	W 89–76	11–7 (6–3)	Freedom Hall; Louisville, KY
Feb 6, 1999		Marquette	W 81–77	12–7 (7–3)	Freedom Hall; Louisville, KY
Feb 11, 1999		at UNC Charlotte	W 79–68	13–7 (8–3)	Dale F. Halton Arena; Charlotte, NC
Feb 14, 1999*		Georgia Tech	W 78–58	14–7	Freedom Hall; Louisville, KY
Feb 16, 1999		Houston	W 106–78	15–7 (9–3)	Freedom Hall; Louisville, KY
Feb 18, 1999		at Tulane	W 80–75	16–7 (10–3)	Avron B. Fogelman Arena; New Orleans, LA
Feb 21, 1999		at No. 9 Cincinnati	L 78–91	16–8 (10–4)	Myrl H. Shoemaker Center; Cincinnati, OH
Feb 25, 1999		UAB	W 91–60	17–8 (11–4)	Freedom Hall; Louisville, KY
Feb 27, 1999		at Southern Miss	L 58–59	17–9 (11–5)	Reed Green Coliseum; Hattiesburg, MS
Conference USA tournament
Mar 4, 1999	(2)	vs. (7) Saint Louis; Quarterfinals	W 70–61	18–9	BJCC Coliseum; Birmingham, AL
Mar 5, 1999	(2)	at (3) UAB; Semifinals	W 77–68	19–9	BJCC Coliseum; Birmingham, AL
Mar 6, 1999	(2)	vs. (5) UNC Charlotte; Finals	L 59–68	19–10	BJCC Coliseum; Birmingham, AL
NCAA Tournament
Mar 11, 1999*	(7)	vs. (10) Creighton; First Round	L 58–62	19–11	Amway Arena; Orlando, FL
*Non-conference game. ^{#}Rankings from AP Poll. (#) Tournament seedings in parentheses.
