= 2000–01 Cincinnati Bearcats men's basketball team =

American college basketball season

2000–01 Cincinnati Bearcats men's basketball

Conference USA regular season champions

NCAA tournament, Sweet Sixteen
- Conference: Conference USA

Ranking
- Coaches: No. 22
- Record: 25–10 (11–5 C-USA)
- Head coach: Bob Huggins (12th season)
- Assistant coach: Mick Cronin (5th season)
- Home arena: Myrl Shoemaker Center

2000–01 Conference USA men's basketball standings
	Conf.				Overall
Team	W		L	PCT	W		L	PCT
American
Cincinnati	11	–	5	.688	25	–	10	.714
Charlotte †	10	–	6	.625	22	–	11	.667
Marquette	9	–	7	.563	15	–	14	.517
Saint Louis	8	–	8	.500	17	–	14	.548
Louisville	8	–	8	.500	12	–	19	.387
DePaul	4	–	12	.250	12	–	18	.400
National
Southern Miss	11	–	5	.688	22	–	9	.710
Memphis	10	–	6	.625	21	–	15	.583
South Florida	9	–	7	.563	18	–	13	.581
UAB	8	–	8	.500	17	–	14	.548
Houston	6	–	10	.375	9	–	20	.310
Tulane	2	–	14	.125	9	–	21	.300
† 2001 Conference USA Tournament winner Rankings from AP Poll

The 2000–01 Cincinnati Bearcats men's basketball team represented University of Cincinnati as a member of Conference USA during the 2000–01 NCAA Division I men's basketball season. The head coach was Bob Huggins, serving in his 12th year at the school. The Bearcats finished with a 25–10 record (11–5 C-USA).

== Roster ==
2000–01 Cincinnati Bearcats men's basketball team
Players
Coaches

Pos.	#	Name	Height	Weight	Year	Hometown
F	1	Jamaal Davis	6 ft 9 in (2.06 m)	235 lb (107 kg)	Jr	Merrillville, Indiana
G	2	Field Williams	6 ft 4 in (1.93 m)	235 lb (107 kg)	Fr	Houston, Texas
G	11	Kenny Satterfield	6 ft 2 in (1.88 m)	175 lb (79 kg)	So	New York City, New York
G	13	Leonard Stokes	6 ft 6 in (1.98 m)	200 lb (91 kg)	So	Buffalo, New York
G	14	David Dissinger	6 ft 4 in (1.93 m)	185 lb (84 kg)	Sr	Cincinnati, Ohio
G	22	Steve Logan	5 ft 10 in (1.78 m)	195 lb (88 kg)	Jr	Cleveland, Ohio
G	34	Chris Taflinger	6 ft 2 in (1.88 m)	180 lb (82 kg)	So	Lima, Ohio
C	44	B. J. Grove	6 ft 11 in (2.11 m)	255 lb (116 kg)	So	Cincinnati, Ohio
G	42	Steven London	6 ft 1 in (1.85 m)	180 lb (82 kg)	Sr	Louisville, KY
C	50	Donald Little	6 ft 10 in (2.08 m)	215 lb (98 kg)	So	Augusta, Georgia

Head coach

Bob Huggins

Assistant coach(es)

- Mick Cronin

Legend

- (C) Team captain
- (S) Suspended
- (I) Ineligible
- (W) Walk-on
- Injured
- Current redshirt

== Schedule and results ==
Date time, TV	Rank^{#}	Opponent^{#}	Result	Record	Site city, state
Regular Season
Nov 18, 2000*	No. 17	Boise State	W 73–61	1–0	Myrl Shoemaker Center; Cincinnati, Ohio
Nov 21, 2000*	No. 16	Marshall	W 79–75	2–0	Myrl Shoemaker Center; Cincinnati, Ohio
Nov 25, 2000*	No. 16	at No. 14 Notre Dame	L 51–69	2–1	Joyce Center; Notre Dame, Indiana
Nov 29, 2000*	No. 22	at No. 24 Dayton	W 82–75	3–1	UD Arena; Dayton, Ohio
Dec 11, 2000*	No. 18	Oakland	W 97–58	4–1	Myrl Shoemaker Center; Cincinnati, Ohio
Dec 14, 2000*	No. 17	Xavier	L 67–69	4–2	Myrl Shoemaker Center; Cincinnati, Ohio
Dec 16, 2000*	No. 17	at UNLV; Las Vegas Showdown	W 90–72	5–2	Thomas & Mack Center; Paradise, Nevada
Dec 20, 2000*	No. 22	vs. Youngstown State; Puerto Rico Holiday Classic	W 74–65	6–2	Guerra Sports Complex; San Juan, Puerto Rico
Dec 21, 2000*	No. 22	vs. Clemson; Puerto Rico Holiday Classic	W 88–80	7–2	Guerra Sports Complex; San Juan, Puerto Rico
Dec 22, 2000*	No. 22	vs. No. 17 Alabama; Puerto Rico Holiday Classic	W 77–74 ^{OT}	8–2	Guerra Sports Complex; San Juan, Puerto Rico
Dec 28, 2000*	No. 19	UNC Wilmington	W 65–55	9–2	Myrl Shoemaker Center; Cincinnati, Ohio
Dec 30, 2000*	No. 19	vs. Toledo; Gatorade Rock-N-Roll Shootout	L 66–69	9–3	
Jan 6, 2001; 6:05 p.m.	No. 25	UNC Charlotte	W 76–66	10–3 (1–0)	Myrl Shoemaker Center; Cincinnati, Ohio
Jan 10, 2001		at Marquette	L 44–47	10–4 (1–1)	Bradley Center; Milwaukee, Wisconsin
Jan 13, 2001		at Louisville	W 72–52	11–4 (2–1)	Freedom Hall; Louisville, Kentucky
Jan 17, 2001		UAB	W 90–83	12–4 (3–1)	Myrl Shoemaker Center; Cincinnati, Ohio
Jan 20, 2001		at Saint Louis	L 62–71 ^{OT}	12–5 (3–2)	Savvis Center; St. Louis, Missouri
Jan 24, 2001		Louisville	L 54–63	12–6 (3–3)	Myrl Shoemaker Center; Cincinnati, Ohio
Jan 27, 2001*		No. 9 Wake Forest	W 78–72 ^{OT}	13–6	Myrl H. Shoemaker Center; Cincinnati, Ohio
Jan 29, 2001		Tulane	W 105–57	14–6 (4–3)	Myrl Shoemaker Center; Cincinnati, Ohio
Feb 1, 2001; 9:00 p.m.		at UNC Charlotte	L 58–60	14–7 (4–4)	Dale F. Halton Arena; Charlotte, North Carolina
Feb 3, 2001		DePaul	W 91–70	15–7 (5–4)	Myrl Shoemaker Center; Cincinnati, Ohio
Feb 10, 2001		at Southern Miss	W 64–52	16–7 (6–4)	Reed Green Coliseum; Hattiesburg, Mississippi
Feb 15, 2001		at Memphis	W 66–65	17–7 (7–4)	The Pyramid; Memphis, Tennessee
Feb 18, 2001		Marquette	L 63–66 ^{OT}	17–8 (7–5)	Myrl Shoemaker Center; Cincinnati, Ohio
Feb 21, 2001		Saint Louis	W 68–61	18–8 (8–5)	Myrl Shoemaker Center; Cincinnati, Ohio
Feb 24, 2001		Houston	W 85–50	19–8 (9–5)	Myrl Shoemaker Center; Cincinnati, Ohio
Mar 1, 2001		at South Florida	W 77–66	20–8 (10–5)	Yuengling Center; Tampa, Florida
Mar 3, 2001		at DePaul	W 75–62	21–8 (11–5)	Allstate Arena; Rosemont, Illinois
Conference USA Tournament
Mar 8, 2001*	(1)	vs. (9) UAB; Quarterfinals	W 73–70	22–8	Freedom Hall; Louisville, Kentucky
Mar 9, 2001*	(1)	vs. (4) Memphis; Semifinals	W 89–79	23–8	Freedom Hall; Louisville, Kentucky
Mar 10, 2001*	(1)	vs. (3) UNC Charlotte; Championship game	L 72–80	23–9	Freedom Hall; Louisville, Kentucky
NCAA Tournament
Mar 15, 2001*	(5 W)	vs. (12 W) BYU; First round	W 84–59	24–9	Cox Arena; San Diego, California
Mar 17, 2001*	(5 W)	vs. (13 W) Kent State; Second Round	W 66–43	25–9	Cox Arena; San Diego, California
Mar 22, 2001*; 9:00 p.m., CBS	(5 W)	vs. (1 W) No. 2 Stanford; West Regional semifinal – Sweet Sixteen	L 65–78	25–10	Arrowhead Pond of Anaheim (18,008); Anaheim, California
*Non-conference game. ^{#}Rankings from AP poll. (#) Tournament seedings in parentheses. W=West. All times are in Eastern Time.

== Rankings ==
Ranking movements Legend: ██ Increase in ranking ██ Decrease in ranking — = Not ranked
	Week																			
Poll	Pre	1	2	3	4	5	6	7	8	9	10	11	12	13	14	15	16	17	18	Final
AP	18	17	16	22	18	17	22	19	25	—	—	—	—	—	—	—	—	—	—	Not released
Coaches	14	—	13	17	18	18	20	18	24	—	—	—	—	—	—	—	—	—	—	22

^Coaches did not release a Week 1 poll.
*AP did not release post-NCAA Tournament rankings

== 2001 NBA draft ==
Round	Pick	Player	NBA Team
2	54	Kenny Satterfield	Dallas Mavericks
