= 1997 McDonald's All-American Boys Game =

American high school basketball game

East	West
94	81
	1st half	2nd half	Total
East	49	45	94
West	42	39	81
- Date: March 29, 1997
- Venue: Clune Arena, Colorado Springs, CO
- MVP: Kenny Gregory
- Referees: Ed Ristau; Greg Burks; Verne Harris
- Attendance: 5,858
- Network: CBS

McDonald's All-American

The 1997 McDonald's All-American Boys Game was an All-star basketball Game played on Saturday, March 29, 1997 at the Clune Arena in Colorado Springs, Colorado. The game's rosters featured the best and most highly recruited high school boys graduating in 1997. The game was the 20th annual version of the McDonald's All-American Game, first played in 1978.

== 1997 game ==
The game was telecast live by CBS for the last time. Beginning in 1998, ESPN became the broadcaster for the McDonald's All-American games. Tracy McGrady did not play in the game because his mother and grandmother could not fly to Colorado Springs to attend the game due to the high prices of plane tickets. Since they could not be present, he declined to play. The 1997 game was the lowest-scoring of the history of the McDonald's All-American games. Kenny Gregory won the MVP award with an entertaining style of play that included several dunks; other players who starred were Duke-bound Elton Brand, who scored 16 points; Lamar Odom and Larry Hughes, who were respectively 1 point and 1 rebound shy of recording a double-double (Odom 9 points/11 rebounds; Hughes 17 pts/9 rebs); and Dion Glover, who scored 15 points in 17 minutes. For the first time in the event history, two twins played in the game: this was the case of brothers Jarron and Jason Collins, who were part of the West team. To celebrate the 20th anniversary of the McDonald's All-American game, fans selected an all-time team: the final selections were Magic Johnson, Michael Jordan, Grant Hill, Christian Laettner and Patrick Ewing. Of the 24 players, 16 went on to play in the NBA: among them McGrady who declared for the 1997 NBA draft and was selected with the 9th overall pick by the Toronto Raptors, following Kevin Garnett (1995), Kobe Bryant and Jermaine O'Neal (both 1996), three other McDonald's All-Americans who were drafted out of high school.

=== East roster ===
No.	Name	Height	Weight	Position	Hometown	High school	College of Choice
00	Brendan Haywood	7-0	268	C	Greensboro, NC, U.S.	James B. Dudley	North Carolina
3	Dion Glover	6-5	228	G	Ellenwood, GA, U.S.	Cedar Grove	Undecided; Committed later to Georgia Tech.
5	Marcus Fizer	6-8	260	F	Arcadia, LA, U.S.	Arcadia	Iowa State
13	Ron Artest	6-6	244	F	New York City, NY, U.S.	La Salle Academy	Undecided; Committed later to St. John's.
14	Tony Harris	6-0	165	G	Memphis, TN, U.S.	East	Tennessee
15	Anthony Perry	6-3	186	G	Jersey City, NJ, U.S.	St. Anthony	Georgetown
25	Mark Karcher	6-5	215	F	Baltimore, MD, U.S.	St. Frances Academy	Undecided; Committed later to Temple.
33	Melvin Ely	6-10	260	C	Harvey, IL, U.S.	Thornton Township	Fresno State
35	Lamar Odom	6-10	220	F	New Britain, CT, U.S.	St. Thomas Aquinas	Undecided; Committed later to Rhode Island.
41	Elton Brand	6-9	260	F	Peekskill, NY, U.S.	Peekskill	Duke
42	Khalid El-Amin	5-10	200	G	Minneapolis, MN, U.S.	North	Undecided; Committed later to Connecticut.
55	Shane Battier	6-8	220	F	Beverly Hills, MI, U.S.	Detroit Country Day	Duke

=== West roster ===
No.	Name	Height	Weight	Position	Hometown	High school	College of Choice
1	Tracy McGrady	6-8	205	F	Durham, NC, U.S.	Mount Zion Christian Academy	Undecided (Did not attend)
5	Baron Davis	6-2	200	G	Santa Monica, CA, U.S.	Crossroads	Undecided; Committed later to UCLA.
20	Larry Hughes	6-5	185	G	St. Louis, MO, U.S.	Christian Brothers	St. Louis
21	Kenny Gregory	6-5	208	G	Columbus, OH, U.S.	Independence	Kansas
24	Ryan Humphrey	6-7	235	F	Tulsa, OK, U.S.	Booker T. Washington	Undecided; Committed later to Notre Dame.
25	Luke Recker	6-5	210	G	Waterloo, IN, U.S.	DeKalb	Indiana
31	Britton Johnsen	6-10	210	F	Murray, UT, U.S.	Murray	Utah
32	Jarron Collins	6-9	255	F	North Hollywood, CA, U.S.	Harvard-Westlake	Stanford
33	Jason Collins	6-10	255	C	North Hollywood, CA, U.S.	Harvard-Westlake	Stanford
34	Eric Chenowith	7-1	270	C	Villa Park, CA, U.S.	Villa Park	Kansas
44	Chris Burgess	6-11	245	F	Woodbridge, CA, U.S.	Woodbridge	Duke
52	Marcus Griffin	6-9	235	F	Peoria, IL, U.S.	Manual	Illinois

=== Coaches ===
The East team was coached by:

- Head Coach Thomas Hargrove of Anacostia High School (Washington, D.C.)
- Asst Coach Kevin Hargrove of Anacostia High School (Washington, D.C.)

The West team was coached by:

- Head Coach Mark Beranek of Sierra High School (Colorado Springs, Colorado)
- Asst Coach Todd Morse of Lewis-Palmer High School (Monument, Colorado)
- Asst Coach David Shaub of Centennial High School (Pueblo, Colorado)

== All-American Week ==
=== Contest winners ===
- The 1997 Slam Dunk contest was won by Baron Davis.
- The 1997 3-point shoot-out was won by Shane Battier.
