= 2010–11 Euroleague Top 16 Group F =

Standings and Results for Group F of the Top 16 phase of the 2010–11 Euroleague basketball tournament.

== Standings ==
Key to colors
Top two places in each group advance to Quarterfinals

	Team	Pld	W	L	PF	PA	Diff	Tie-break
1.	(Spain) FC Barcelona	6	6	0	471	402	+69	
2.	(Israel) Maccabi Tel Aviv	6	3	3	511	442	+69	
3.	(Italy) Lottomatica Roma	6	2	4	411	462	−51	
4.	(Slovenia) Union Olimpija	6	1	5	394	481	−87	

== Fixtures and results ==
All times given below are in Central European Time.

Unless otherwise indicated, all attendance totals are from the corresponding match report posted on the official Euroleague site and included with each game summary.

=== Game 1 ===
20 January 2011
20:45

Report

Regal FC Barcelona (Spain)	81–71	(Israel) Maccabi Tel Aviv
Scoring by quarter: 21–16, 20–21, 22–16, 18–18
Pts: Navarro 24; Rebs: Perović 6 Asts: Rubio 8		Pts: Hendrix, Perkins 13; Rebs: Perkins 8 Asts: Eidson 4

Palau Blaugrana, Barcelona
Attendance: 6,235
Referees: Carl Jungebrand (FIN), Sreten Radovic (CRO), Olegs Latisevs (LAT)

20 January 2011
21:00

Report

Lottomatica Roma (Italy)	63–64	(Slovenia) Union Olimpija
Scoring by quarter: 19–18, 16–15, 14–14, 14–17
Pts: Dašić 18; Rebs: Dašić 11; Asts: Washington 4		Pts: Gregory 19; Rebs: Gregory 14; Asts: Ilievski 3

PalaLottomatica, Rome
Attendance: 2,453
Referees: Ilija Belosevic (SRB), Juan Carlos Garcia Gonzalez (ESP), Sergey Mikhaylov (RUS)

=== Game 2 ===
27 January 2011
20:00

Report

Maccabi Tel Aviv (Israel)	99–58	(Italy) Lottomatica Roma
Scoring by quarter: 30–18, 27–13, 18–13, 24–14
Pts: Schortsanitis 19; Rebs: Schortsanitis 10; Asts: Perkins 9		Pts: Dašić 13; Rebs: Dašić 7 Asts: Đedović 3

Nokia Arena, Tel Aviv
Attendance: 11,500
Referees: Juan Carlos Mitjana (ESP), Milivoje Jovcic (SRB), Milija Vojinovic (SRB)

27 January 2011
20:45

Report

Union Olimpija (Slovenia)	67–68	(Spain) Regal FC Barcelona
Scoring by quarter: 11–19, 15–17, 28–16, 13–16
Pts: Gregory, Shermadini 14; Rebs: Gregory 9 Asts: Ilievski 6		Pts: Navarro 27; Rebs: Lorbek 7 Asts: Rubio 3

Arena Stožice, Ljubljana
Attendance: 13,000
Referees: Christos Christodoulou (GRE), Recep Ankarali (TUR), Panagiotis Anastopoulos (GRE)

=== Game 3 ===
3 February 2011
20:00

Report

Maccabi Tel Aviv (Israel)	104–67	(Slovenia) Union Olimpija
Scoring by quarter: 28–10, 21–16, 22–23, 33–18
Pts: Pargo 21; Rebs: Perkins 7 Asts: Pargo, Eidson 6		Pts: Shermadini 15; Rebs: Markota 8 Asts: Ožbolt 5

Nokia Arena, Tel Aviv
Attendance: 11,500
Referees: Juan Carlos Arteaga (ESP), Guerrino Cerebuch (ITA), Nicola Maestre (FRA)

3 February 2011
20:45

Report

Regal FC Barcelona (Spain)	80–56	(Italy) Lottomatica Roma
Scoring by quarter: 21–17, 24–19, 16–9, 19–11
Pts: Anderson 16; Rebs: Vázquez, Rubio 5 Asts: Three players 5		Pts: Traore 17; Rebs: Datome 10; Asts: Smith 3

Palau Blaugrana, Barcelona
Attendance: 5,358
Referees: Zoran Sutulovic (MNE), Sradan Dozai (CRO), Robert Lottermoser (GER)

=== Game 4 ===
17 February 2011
20:45

Report

Lottomatica Roma (Italy)	65–74	(Spain) Regal FC Barcelona
Scoring by quarter: 14–14, 13–11, 24–21, 14–28
Pts: Datome 15; Rebs: Washington, Crosariol 7 Asts: Smith, Washington, Datome 3		Pts: Navarro 19; Rebs: Rubio 8 Asts: Rubio 4

PalaLottomatica, Rome
Attendance: 3,662
Referees: Grzegorz Iemblicki (POL), Dubravko Muhvic (CRO), Elias Koromilas (GRE)

17 February 2011
20:45

Report

Union Olimpija (Slovenia)	62–83	(Israel) Maccabi Tel Aviv
Scoring by quarter: 19–22, 22–11, 8–23, 13–27
Pts: Gregory 11; Rebs: Shermadini 7 Asts: Ilievski 3		Pts: Pargo, Eliyahu, Perkins 16; Rebs: Perkins 5 Asts: Pargo, Perkins 7

Arena Stožice, Ljubljana
Attendance: 13,000
Referees: Dani Hierrezuelo (ESP), Spiros Gkontas (GRE), Roberto Chiari (ITA)

=== Game 5 ===
23 February 2011
20:45

Report

Union Olimpija (Slovenia)	76–87	(Italy) Lottomatica Roma
Scoring by quarter: 14–20, 27–17, 14–28, 21–22
Pts: Gregory 18; Rebs: Gregory 4 Asts: Ilievski 5		Pts: Djedovic 20; Rebs: Dašić 5 Asts: Djedovic, Washington 3

Arena Stožice, Ljubljana
Attendance: 12,600
Referees: Jose Ramon Garcia Ortiz (ESP), Sinisa Herceg (CRO), Radomir Vojinovic (MNE)

24 February 2011
20:00

Report

Maccabi Tel Aviv (Israel)	85–92 (OT)	(Spain) Regal FC Barcelona
Scoring by quarter: 24–16, 15–14, 21–24, 13–19, Overtime: 12–19
Pts: Pargo 19; Rebs: Hendrix 9 Asts: Eidson 3		Pts: Morris 19; Rebs: Perović 9 Asts: Navarro 4

Nokia Arena, Tel Aviv
Attendance: 11,500
Referees: Luigi Lamonica (ITA), Sasa Pukl (SLO), Olegs Latisevs (MNE)

=== Game 6 ===
3 March 2011
20:45

Report

Regal FC Barcelona (Spain)	76–58	(Slovenia) Union Olimpija
Scoring by quarter: 21–19, 14–12, 16–13, 25–14
Pts: Lakovič 12; Rebs: Morris, Lorbek 6 Asts: Rubio 6		Pts: Gregory, Jagodnik 13; Rebs: Gregory 7 Asts: Udrih 5

Palau Blaugrana, Barcelona
Attendance: 4,126
Referees: Milivoje Jovcic (SRB), Tolga Sahin (TUR), Panagiotis Anastopoulos (GRE)

3 March 2011
20:45

Report

Lottomatica Roma (Italy)	82–69	(Israel) Maccabi Tel Aviv
Scoring by quarter: 21–17, 21–25, 18–6, 22–21
Pts: Washington 16; Rebs: Datome 10; Asts: Gordić 5		Pts: Eliyahu, Perkins 14; Rebs: Eliyahu 8 Asts: Perkins 5

PalaLottomatica, Rome
Attendance: 2,873
Referees: Juan Carlos Mitjana (ESP), Recep Ankarali (TUR), Milija Vojinovic (SRB)
