= Brandon Greene =

American football player (born 1994)

No. 60, 75
- Position: Offensive tackle

Personal information
- Born: March 1, 1994 (age 32); Ellenwood, Georgia
- Listed height: 6 ft 5 in (1.96 m)
- Listed weight: 295 lb (134 kg)

Career information
- High school: Cedar Grove (Ellenwood, Georgia)
- College: Alabama
- NFL draft: 2017: undrafted

Career history
- Chicago Bears (2017); Birmingham Iron (2019); Carolina Panthers (2019)
- Stats at Pro Football Reference

Brandon Greene (born March 1, 1994) is an American former football offensive tackle. He played college football at Alabama.

== College career ==
At Alabama, Greene split time between tight end and offensive line while also seeing time at defensive end throughout his college career. In 2016, Greene moved to strictly playing tight end and occasionally on the offensive line, playing in all 15 games his final season.

== Professional career ==
=== Chicago Bears ===
Greene signed with the Chicago Bears as an undrafted free agent on August 7, 2017. He was waived on September 2, 2017 and was signed to the practice squad the next day. He was promoted to the active roster on December 23, 2017.

On September 1, 2018, Greene was waived by the Bears.

=== Birmingham Iron (AAF) ===
On November 19, 2018, Greene signed with the Birmingham Iron of the Alliance of American Football.

=== Carolina Panthers ===
After the AAF suspended football operations, Greene signed with the Carolina Panthers on April 8, 2019. He was placed on injured reserve on September 23, 2019, with a neck injury.
