= Christen Miller =

American football player (born 2004)

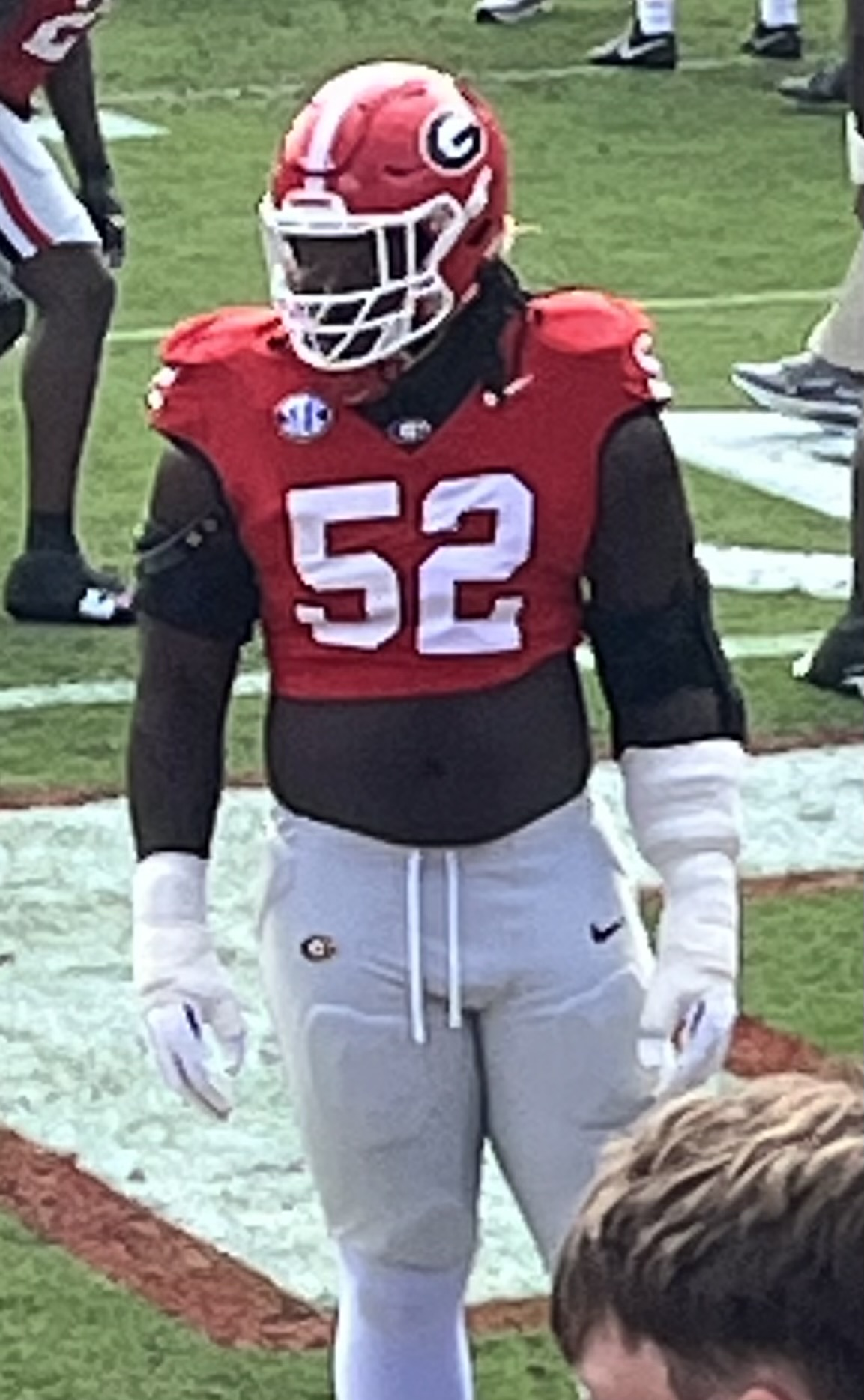
- Miller with the Georgia Bulldogs in 2025

No. 52 – New Orleans Saints
- Position: Defensive tackle
- Roster status: Injured reserve

Personal information
- Born: August 5, 2004 (age 22); Hinesville, Georgia, U.S.
- Listed height: 6 ft 4 in (1.93 m)
- Listed weight: 321 lb (146 kg)

Career information
- High school: Cedar Grove (Ellenwood, Georgia)
- College: Georgia (2022–2025)
- NFL draft: 2026: 2nd round, 42nd overall pick

Career history
- New Orleans Saints (2026–present)

Awards and highlights
- First-team All-SEC (2025)

Career NFL statistics as of Week 7, 2026
- Total tackles: 5
- Stats at Pro Football Reference

Christen Emmanuel Miller (born August 5, 2004) is an American professional football defensive tackle for the New Orleans Saints of the National Football League (NFL). He played college football for the Georgia Bulldogs and was selected by the Saints in the second round of the 2026 NFL draft.

== Early life ==
Miller was born on August 5, 2004, in Hinesville, Georgia. He attended Cedar Grove High School in Ellenwood, Georgia, where he played football as a defensive tackle. He helped Cedar Grove to the state championship in 2019 as a sophomore and in 2021 as a senior. He was named the GHSA Defensive Player of the Year and first-team All-State by the Atlanta Journal-Constitution. He was also invited to the All-American Bowl. A four-star prospect, he committed to play college football for the Georgia Bulldogs.

== College career ==
As a freshman at Georgia, Miller appeared in four games. The following year, he recorded 14 tackles, four tackles-for-loss, and a sack. He initially planned to enter the NCAA transfer portal after the season, but then changed his mind and returned for the 2024 season. He became a starter in 2024, starting 10 games and recording 27 tackles and 3.5 tackles-for-loss. Pro Football Focus (PFF) graded him as one of the best defensive linemen among Power Four conferences in the 2024 season. He opted to return to the Bulldogs as a senior in 2025, rather than enter the NFL draft. PFF ranked him as the fourth-best returning interior defensive lineman for the 2025 season.

== Professional career ==
Pre-draft measurables
Height	Weight	Arm length	Hand span	Wingspan
6 ft 3 3/4 in (1.92 m)	321 lb (146 kg)	33 in (0.84 m)	10 in (0.25 m)	6 ft 8 1/8 in (2.04 m)
All values from NFL Combine

Miller was selected by the New Orleans Saints in the second round (42nd overall) of the 2026 NFL draft. The Saints signed Miller on May 9, 2026.
