= Desi Banks =

American comedian (born 1993)

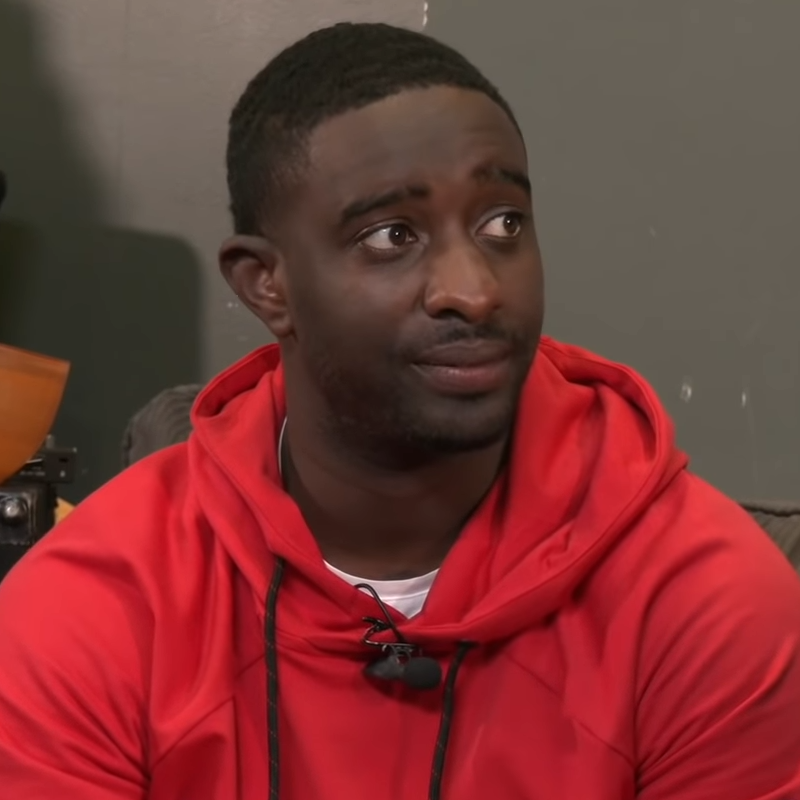
- Banks in 2020
- Born: Desi Terrell Banks Jr. May 9, 1993 (age 33); Atlanta, Georgia, U.S.

Comedy career
- Years active: 2012–present
- Medium: Social media, stand-up
- Football career

Profile
- Position: Wide receiver

Personal information
- Listed height: 6 ft 2 in (1.88 m)
- Listed weight: 187 lb (85 kg)

Career information
- High school: Cedar Grove (Ellenwood, Georgia)
- College: Morehead State (2011–2012)
- Website: Official website

Desi Terrell Banks Jr. (born May 9, 1993) is an American comedian and actor. He played two seasons of college football for Morehead State as a wide receiver.

== Early life and education ==
Banks was born and raised in the Eastside of Atlanta, Georgia. He said he was "always the funny kid growing up" and influenced by comedians Eddie Murphy and Martin Lawrence. He went to Cedar Grove High School in Ellenwood, Georgia, where he competed in track, baseball, and football.

Banks played football in college for the Morehead State Eagles. As a freshman and sophomore in 2011 and 2012, he recorded fourteen receptions for 162 yards and two touchdowns in fifteen games. He transferred and joined the Georgia State Panthers football team but did not get any playing time. He graduated from Georgia State in December 2015 with a bachelor's degree in sociology.

== Career ==
Banks began posting comedy sketches to Vine in 2012. As his videos went viral, he decided after graduation in 2015 to build a career in comedy because "football didn't work out". He expanded to other platforms, such as Instagram, Twitter, Facebook, and YouTube, and posted three or four videos daily. As of 2023, he has over 8 million followers on Instagram, and his YouTube channel has accumulated over 2 million subscribers and over 750 million views. The Hollywood Reporter has ranked him at least as high as No. 3 on its Top Comedians list.

Banks started doing stand-up comedy in 2017. In 2018, he founded a production company, Desi Banks Productions, that makes online videos. He has acted in films such as Will Packer's Little (2018).

== Filmography ==
Year(s)	Title	Role	Notes
2016	Cream X Coffee	Groomsman #1	TV series; episode: "Black Love Matters"
2017	Love by Chance	Dante	Film
2017	La Vie Magnifique De Charlie	Record Store Customer	Film
2019	Little	Postmates Delivery Guy	Film
2021	Haunted Trail	Zay	Film
2022	Sherman's Showcase	Fonk the Freak	TV series; episode: "Murder at the Shrind"
2025	One of Them Days	Party Guest	Film; Cameo
