= Xavier Avery =

American baseball player (born 1990)

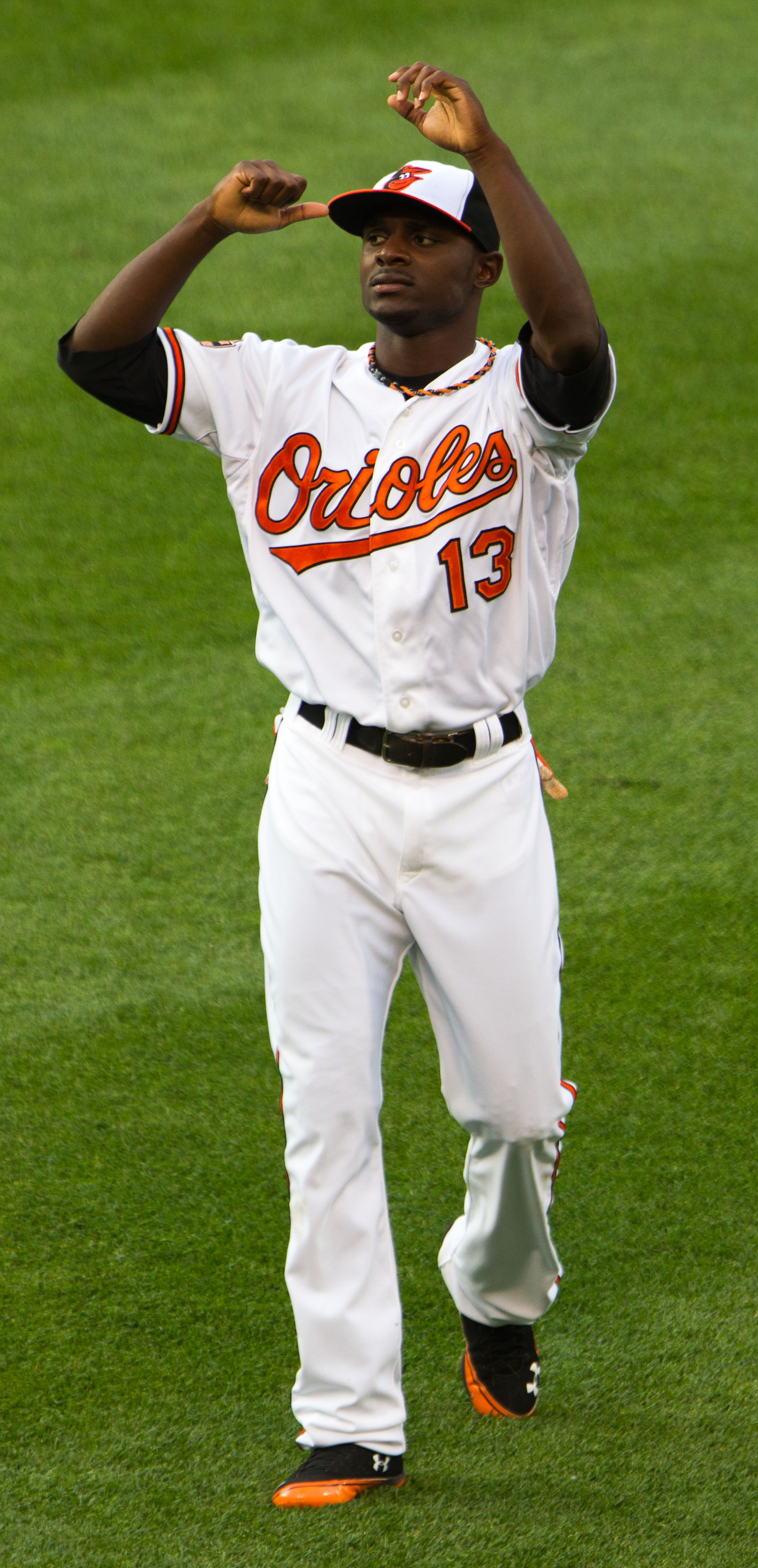
- Avery with the Baltimore Orioles
- Outfielder
- Born: January 1, 1990 (age 36); Atlanta, Georgia, U.S.
- Batted: Left Threw: Left

MLB debut
- May 13, 2012, for the Baltimore Orioles

Last MLB appearance
- October 1, 2012, for the Baltimore Orioles

MLB statistics
- Batting average: .223
- Home runs: 1
- Runs batted in: 6
- Stolen bases: 6
- Stats at Baseball Reference

Teams
- Baltimore Orioles (2012)

Xavier Tyrone Avery (born January 1, 1990) is an American former professional baseball outfielder. He played in Major League Baseball (MLB) for one season with the Baltimore Orioles in 2012.

== Career ==
=== Baltimore Orioles ===
Avery attended Cedar Grove High School in Ellenwood, Georgia. He initially committed to play college football for the Georgia Bulldogs. The Baltimore Orioles drafted Avery in the second round of the 2008 Major League Baseball draft.

Avery was called up to the majors for the first time on May 13, 2012. The following day, he scored his first major league run and collected his first double, triple and RBI. He hit his first career home run on June 29, 2012 against the Cleveland Indians. The Orioles optioned Avery to Norfolk in July, and recalled him again September 1 when the team's roster expanded

=== Seattle Mariners ===
On August 30, 2013, the Orioles traded Avery to the Seattle Mariners in exchange for Michael Morse. He was designated for assignment on March 28, 2014 and subsequently outrighted to the Triple-A Tacoma Rainiers, where he finished the season.

=== Detroit Tigers ===
On November 21, 2014, Avery signed a minor league contract with the Detroit Tigers. He was released on July 1, 2015 after exercising an opt-out in his contract.

=== San Francisco Giants ===
On July 3, 2015, Avery signed a minor league contract with the San Francisco Giants. He made 13 appearances for the Triple-A Sacramento River Cats, batting .244/.346/.311 with no home runs and one RBI. Avery was released by the Giants organization on July 21.

=== Minnesota Twins ===
On July 26, 2015, Avery signed with the Minnesota Twins. He completed the season on the roster of their Triple-A Rochester Red Wings.

=== Baltimore Orioles (second stint) ===
On December 15, 2015, Avery signed a minor league deal to return to the Baltimore Orioles organization. Playing in 101 games for the Triple-A Norfolk Tides, Avery hit .248/.332/.363 with 6 home runs, 19 RBI, and 18 stolen bases. He elected free agency following the season on November 7, 2016.

=== Atlanta Braves ===
On January 23, 2017, Avery signed a minor league contract with the Atlanta Braves. He re-signed with the team after the 2017 season ended.

Avery spent the 2018 season with the Triple–A Gwinnett Braves, hitting .261/.356/.365 with four home runs, 19 RBI, and nine stolen bases. He elected free agency following the season on November 2, 2018.
