= Rockets–Spurs rivalry =

National Basketball Association cross-state rivalry in Texas

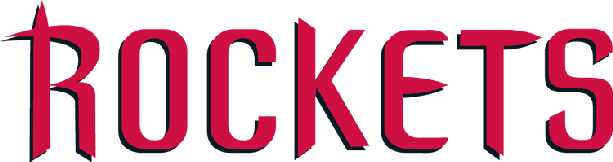
- Houston Rockets San Antonio Spurs
- First meeting: November 27, 1976; Rockets 125, Spurs 116
- Latest meeting: October 23, 2026; Rockets 114, Spurs 110
- Next meeting: January 26th, 2027

Statistics
- Total meetings: 246
- All-time series: 132–114 (SAS)
- Regular season series: 122–102 (SAS)
- Postseason results: 12–10 (HOU)
- Longest win streak: SAS W11
- Current win streak: HOU W1

Postseason history
- 1980 Eastern Conference First Round: Rockets won, 2–1; 1981 Western Conference Semifinals: Rockets won, 4–3; 1995 Western Conference Finals: Rockets won, 4–2; 2017 Western Conference Semifinals: Spurs won, 4–2

The Rockets–Spurs rivalry is an NBA rivalry between the Houston Rockets and the San Antonio Spurs. It is considered one of the most bitter rivalries in the league due to both teams being in the same division, contested games, and close proximity. It is also known as the I-10 Rivalry since San Antonio and Houston lie on Interstate 10, it is one of the three National Basketball Association rivalries between teams from Texas, the others featuring Houston and San Antonio versus the Dallas Mavericks.

== Background ==
The rivalry began in 1976, when the Spurs moved from the American Basketball Association along with the Denver Nuggets, New York Nets, and Indiana Pacers. The Rockets and Spurs competed for the division title, with the Rockets winning it first in 1977 and the Spurs in 1978 and 1979. In 1980, they met in the playoffs for the first time as the Rockets led by Moses Malone and Calvin Murphy beat the Spurs led by George Gervin and James Silas 2–1. The rivalry grew intense as both teams moved from the East to the West. They met again in 1981, this time in the second round. The Spurs had home-court advantage, and were heavily favored, winning the Midwest Division Title and the Rockets only 40–42. The Rockets and Spurs fought to the bitter end before the Rockets held on to win Game 7 capped by Murphy's 42 points. The Rockets would advance to the Finals in a losing cause to the Boston Celtics. The rivalry sparkled in 1995 when the sixth-seeded Rockets led by Hakeem Olajuwon beat the top-seeded Spurs led by MVP David Robinson.

Even after Olajuwon was traded to the Toronto Raptors in 2001, he recalled the fond memories he had of playing against his old San Antonio rival.

"I think when I walk on to that court (at the Alamodome), maybe then it might hit me, all the games I played against San Antonio and the great rivalry we had,...I'm pretty sure David will be very surprised to see me wearing a new uniform. I'm sure it's going to be strange, but at the same time it will be very special. The memories, the competition, the rivalry. I am very much looking forward to it."

— Olajuwon,

After years of dormancy, the rivalry once again began to show signs of life following the 2023 draft lottery when prospective first overall pick Victor Wembanyama appeared to celebrate the Rockets' failure to obtain the first pick of the draft. Wembanyama was also visibly delighted upon the Spurs' receiving of the first pick because of the team's popularity in his home country of France.

== Notable games ==
=== 1981 NBA Playoffs ===
In a classic Game 7, the 40–42 Rockets looked to upset the 52–30 Spurs to advance to the Western Conference Finals. Capped by Calvin Murphy's 42 points, the Rockets defeated the Spurs to advance to the Conference Finals and defeated the likewise 40–42 Kansas City Kings, and moved on to the 1981 NBA Finals where they were defeated by the Celtics. The Spurs waited another 18 years to see a Finals berth and Title.

=== 1995 Playoffs ===
In 1995, the Rockets looked to win their second straight NBA championship. Despite a slow start, the 6th-seeded Rockets (47–35) managed to get through their first opponent, the 3rd-seeded Utah Jazz (60–22) 3–2, and the 2nd-seeded Phoenix Suns (59–23) 4–3. The Rockets would encounter the top seeded Spurs waiting (62–20) for them in the Conference Finals. The Spurs had swept their first round opponent, the Denver Nuggets (41–41) before defeating the Los Angeles Lakers (48–34) in 6 games.

Olajuwon displayed perhaps the most impressive moments of his career when the Rockets faced the San Antonio Spurs in the Conference Finals. Recently crowned league MVP Robinson was outplayed by Olajuwon, 35–24 PPG. When asked later what a team could do to "solve" Olajuwon, Robinson told LIFE magazine: "Hakeem? You don't solve Hakeem." The Rockets won every road game that series and beat the Spurs 4–2. The Rockets swept the Orlando Magic in the 1995 NBA Finals 4–0, and secured their second Championship. Thus far, the Rockets had won a division title, conference title and Championship before their rivals.

=== 2004 Rockets comeback ===
It took place on December 9, 2004, after a long fought game in which the Spurs had mostly led (up by 10 points under a minute left) and the Rockets crowd beginning to boo their own team; Tracy McGrady scored 13 points in 35 seconds, including a 3 with 1.7 seconds left to give the Rockets an 81–80 comeback win. The game ended a 7-game losing streak against the Spurs for Houston.

=== 2008 Spurs comeback ===
In 2008, the teams would meet for the first match on November 14 at the AT&T Center in San Antonio. The Spurs began the 2008 season with their worst record in franchise history (2–4), as a result of an injury to Manu Ginóbili at the 2008 Summer Olympics, and a sprained ankle to Tony Parker early in the season. This was the first regular season game in which the newly acquired Ron Artest along with Tracy McGrady and Yao Ming would face San Antonio. The Rockets led most of the game, going up by as many as 14 with 7 minutes left. Despite missing more than 40 points in scoring from their two injured guards, two time MVP Tim Duncan (22 pts) and rookie George Hill (17 pts) led the Spurs' comeback. They finally took the lead (76–75) with 59 seconds left on a hook shot by Duncan. He blocked a layup that would have given the Rockets the lead with less than 2 seconds left. After the Spurs made 1 of 2 free throws, the Rockets got one last chance to win, but Artest missed a 3 as time expired, giving San Antonio a 77–75 victory.

=== 2017 Playoffs ===
The Spurs entered the 2017 NBA playoffs as the second seeded Western Conference team after securing a 61–21 record, their second straight 60+ win season and 20th consecutive postseason appearance. The Spurs dispatched their first round opponent, the Memphis Grizzlies, in six games.

The Rockets entered the playoffs as the third seeded Western Conference team after securing a 55–27 record, a significant improvement over their 41–41 eighth-place finish the previous season. They were led by the 2016–2017 Coach of the Year, Mike D'Antoni. Under D'Antoni, the Rockets set the NBA record for most 3-pointers made in a single season with 1,181. In the first round, the Rockets defeated the Oklahoma City Thunder in five games.

The Spurs and Rockets met in the Western Conference Semifinals. The match-up was the first between the two teams in the playoffs since the 1995 Western Conference Finals. In Game 1, the Rockets defeated the Spurs 126–99. In Game 2 of the series, the Spurs returned the favor with a 121–96 victory. However, the Spurs lost starting point guard Tony Parker indefinitely with a ruptured left quadriceps tendon. The teams split games 3 (Spurs) and 4 (Rockets), evening the series at 2 games apiece. In Game 5 of the series, all-star Spurs small forward Kawhi Leonard suffered an injury to his right ankle in the third quarter, which would eventually result in him sitting out for the closing portions of the game. The game was tightly contest throughout, with both teams failing to capitalize on opportunities to take the lead at the end of regulation. In the overtime period, Manu Ginóbili blocked James Harden's three-point attempt in the final seconds to secure the 110–107 victory for the Spurs. The Spurs would close out the series in a 114–75 Game 6 win. The 75 points were the lowest point total of the season for the Rockets. The Rockets, known throughout the season for their prolific offense, were held to less than 100 points three times in the series after being held below 100 only five times in the regular season.

== Season–by–season results ==
Houston Rockets vs. San Antonio Spurs Season–by–Season Results
1970s (Tie, 9–9)

| Season | Season series | | at Houston Rockets | at San Antonio Spurs | Overall series | Notes |
|---|---|---|---|---|---|---|
| 1976–77 | Tie | 2–2 | Tie, 1–1 | Tie, 1–1 | Tie; 2–2 | As a result of the ABA–NBA merger, the Rockets and Spurs were placed in the same league. The Spurs were placed in the Eastern Conference and the Central Division, becoming divisional rivals with the Rockets. |
| 1977–78 | Spurs | 3–1 | Tie, 1–1 | Spurs, 2–0 | Spurs; 5–3 | |
| 1978–79 | Rockets | 3–1 | Rockets, 2–0 | Tie, 1–1 | Tie; 6–6 | |
| 1979–80 | Tie | 3–3 | Rockets, 2–1 | Spurs, 2–1 | Tie; 9–9 | On December 9, 1979, Spurs beat the Rockets 138–129, their most points scored in a game against the Rockets. On December 26, 1979, Rockets beat the Spurs 143–110, their most points scored in a game against the Spurs. |

1980s (Rockets, 39–29)

| Season | Season series | | at Houston Rockets | at San Antonio Spurs | Overall series | Notes |
|---|---|---|---|---|---|---|
| 1980 Eastern Conference First Round | Rockets | 2–1 | Rockets, 2–0 | Spurs, 1–0 | Rockets; 11–10 | 1st postseason series. |
| 1980–81 | Tie | 3–3 | Rockets, 2–1 | Spurs, 2–1 | Rockets; 14–13 | Rockets and Spurs were moved to the Western Conference and the Midwest Division. |
| 1981 Western Conference Semifinals | Rockets | 4–3 | Spurs, 2–1 | Rockets, 3–1 | Rockets; 18–16 | 2nd postseason series. Rockets go on to lose 1981 NBA Finals. |
| 1981–82 | Tie | 3–3 | Rockets, 2–1 | Spurs, 2–1 | Rockets; 21–19 | |
| 1982–83 | Spurs | 5–1 | Spurs, 2–1 | Spurs, 3–0 | Spurs; 24–22 | |
| 1983–84 | Spurs | 4–2 | Rockets, 2–1 | Spurs, 3–0 | Spurs; 28–24 | On January 20, 1984, Rockets beat the Spurs 138–104, their largest victory against the Spurs with a 34–point differential. |
| 1984–85 | Rockets | 4–2 | Rockets, 2–1 | Rockets, 2–1 | Spurs; 30–28 | |
| 1985–86 | Rockets | 5–1 | Rockets, 3–0 | Rockets, 2–1 | Rockets; 33–31 | Rockets win the Midwest Division for the first time. Rockets lose 1986 NBA Finals. |
| 1986–87 | Rockets | 5–1 | Rockets, 3–0 | Rockets, 2–1 | Rockets; 38–32 | |
| 1987–88 | Spurs | 4–2 | Rockets, 2–1 | Spurs, 3–0 | Rockets; 40–36 | |
| 1988–89 | Rockets | 6–0 | Rockets, 3–0 | Rockets, 3–0 | Rockets; 46–36 | Rockets record their first season series sweep against the Spurs. |
| 1989–90 | Tie | 2–2 | Tie, 1–1 | Tie, 1–1 | Rockets; 48–38 | |

1990s (Spurs, 29–22)

| Season | Season series | | at Houston Rockets | at San Antonio Spurs | Overall series | Notes |
|---|---|---|---|---|---|---|
| 1990–91 | Spurs | 3–2 | Spurs, 2–1 | Tie, 1–1 | Rockets; 50–41 | |
| 1991–92 | Rockets | 3–2 | Tie, 1–1 | Rockets, 2–1 | Rockets; 53–43 | |
| 1992–93 | Rockets | 4–1 | Rockets, 3–0 | Tie, 1–1 | Rockets; 57–44 | Last season Spurs played at HemisFair Arena. Rockets win the Midwest Division. |
| 1993–94 | Spurs | 3–2 | Tie, 1–1 | Spurs, 2–1 | Rockets; 59–47 | Spurs open up Alamodome. Rockets win the Midwest Division. Rockets win 1994 NBA Finals. |
| 1994–95 | Spurs | 5–1 | Spurs, 2–1 | Spurs, 3–0 | Rockets; 60–52 | Spurs finish with the best record in the league (62–20). |
| 1995 Western Conference Finals | Rockets | 4–2 | Spurs, 2–1 | Rockets, 3–0 | Rockets; 64–54 | 3rd postseason series. Rockets go on to win 1995 NBA Finals. |
| 1995–96 | Spurs | 3–1 | Tie, 1–1 | Spurs, 2–0 | Rockets; 65–57 | |
| 1996–97 | Rockets | 3–1 | Tie, 1–1 | Rockets, 2–0 | Rockets; 68–58 | |
| 1997–98 | Tie | 2–2 | Rockets, 2–0 | Spurs, 2–0 | Rockets; 70–60 | Tim Duncan makes his debut for the Spurs. |
| 1998–99 | Spurs | 3–0 | Spurs, 2–0 | Spurs, 1–0 | Rockets; 70–63 | Spurs record their first season series sweep against the Rockets. Spurs finish with the best record in the league (37–13). Spurs win 1999 NBA Finals, their first NBA championship. |
| 1999–2000 | Spurs | 4–0 | Spurs, 2–0 | Spurs, 2–0 | Rockets; 70–67 | |

2000s (Spurs, 28–12)

| Season | Season series | | at Houston Rockets | at San Antonio Spurs | Overall series | Notes |
|---|---|---|---|---|---|---|
| 2000–01 | Spurs | 3–1 | Tie, 1–1 | Spurs, 2–0 | Rockets; 71–70 | Spurs win 11 games in a row against the Rockets. Last season Rockets held the overall series record against the Spurs. Spurs finish with the best record in the league (58–24). |
| 2001–02 | Spurs | 4–0 | Spurs, 2–0 | Spurs, 2–0 | Spurs; 74–71 | Last season Spurs played at Alamodome. Spurs take the overall series record for the first time. |
| 2002–03 | Spurs | 3–1 | Tie, 1–1 | Spurs, 2–0 | Spurs; 77–72 | Spurs open up SBC Center (now known as Frost Bank Center); Last season Rockets played at Compaq Center (formerly known as The Summit). Spurs finish with the best record in the league (60–22). Spurs win 2003 NBA Finals. |
| 2003–04 | Spurs | 4–0 | Spurs, 2–0 | Spurs, 2–0 | Spurs; 81–72 | Rockets open up Toyota Center. |
| 2004–05 | Tie | 2–2 | Rockets, 2–0 | Spurs, 2–0 | Spurs; 83–74 | As part of new realignments, Rockets and Spurs were moved to the new Southwest Division. Spurs win 2005 NBA Finals. |
| 2005–06 | Spurs | 4–0 | Spurs, 2–0 | Spurs, 2–0 | Spurs; 87–74 | Spurs win 17 home games in a row against the Rockets. |
| 2006–07 | Tie | 2–2 | Spurs, 2–0 | Rockets, 2–0 | Spurs; 89–76 | Rockets record their first win, series win and sweep at Houston since the 1996 season. Spurs win 2007 NBA Finals. |
| 2007–08 | Tie | 2–2 | Rockets, 2–0 | Spurs, 2–0 | Spurs; 91–78 | |
| 2008–09 | Tie | 2–2 | Tie, 1–1 | Tie, 1–1 | Spurs; 93–80 | |
| 2009–10 | Tie | 2–2 | Tie, 1–1 | Tie, 1–1 | Spurs; 95–82 | |

2010s (Spurs, 25–20)

| Season | Season series | | at Houston Rockets | at San Antonio Spurs | Overall series | Notes |
|---|---|---|---|---|---|---|
| 2010–11 | Spurs | 3–1 | Tie, 1–1 | Spurs, 2–0 | Spurs; 98–83 | |
| 2011–12 | Tie | 2–2 | Rockets, 2–0 | Spurs, 2–0 | Spurs; 100–85 | Spurs record their 100th win against the Rockets. |
| 2012–13 | Spurs | 3–1 | Tie, 1–1 | Spurs, 2–0 | Spurs; 103–86 | Spurs lose 2013 NBA Finals. |
| 2013–14 | Rockets | 4–0 | Rockets, 2–0 | Rockets, 2–0 | Spurs; 103–90 | One game was played on Christmas. Rockets' first season series win against the Spurs since the 1996 season and their first season series sweep since the 1988 season. Spurs finish with the best record in the league (62–20). Spurs win 2014 NBA Finals. |
| 2014–15 | Spurs | 3–1 | Tie, 1–1 | Spurs, 2–0 | Spurs; 106–91 | Rockets win the Southwest Division for the first time. |
| 2015–16 | Spurs | 3–1 | Tie, 1–1 | Spurs, 2–0 | Spurs; 109–92 | One game was played on Christmas. |
| 2016–17 | Spurs | 3–1 | Spurs, 2–0 | Tie, 1–1 | Spurs; 112–93 | |
| 2017 Western Conference Semifinals | Spurs | 4–2 | Spurs, 2–1 | Spurs, 2–1 | Spurs; 116–95 | 4th postseason series. In game 5, Spurs beat the Rockets 114–75, their largest victory against the Rockets with a 39–point differential. Spurs record their first postseason series win against the Rockets. |
| 2017–18 | Rockets | 3–1 | Rockets, 2–0 | Tie, 1–1 | Spurs; 117–98 | Rockets win the Southwest Division. Rockets finish with the best record in the league (65–17). |
| 2018–19 | Rockets | 3–1 | Rockets, 2–0 | Tie, 1–1 | Spurs; 118–101 | Rockets record their 100th win against the Spurs. Rockets win the Southwest Division. |
| 2019–20 | Spurs | 2–1 | Rockets, 1–0 | Spurs, 2–0 | Spurs; 120–102 | Due to the COVID-19 pandemic suspending the season, their remaining game at San Antonio was played in the 2020 NBA Bubble instead, while their remaining game at Houston was canceled. Rockets win the Southwest Division. |

2020s (Spurs, 11–10)

| Season | Season series | | at Houston Rockets | at San Antonio Spurs | Overall series | Notes |
|---|---|---|---|---|---|---|
| 2020–21 | Spurs | 2–1 | Spurs, 1–0 | Tie, 1–1 | Spurs; 122–103 | Starting with their loss to the Spurs on February 6, 2021, the Rockets went on a 20-game losing streak, setting a franchise record. |
| 2021–22 | Spurs | 3–1 | Spurs, 2–0 | Tie, 1–1 | Spurs; 125–104 | |
| 2022–23 | Tie | 2–2 | Tie, 1–1 | Tie, 1–1 | Spurs; 127–106 | |
| 2023–24 | Rockets | 3–1 | Rockets, 2–0 | Tie, 1–1 | Spurs; 128–109 | First season for Victor Wembanyama. |
| 2024–25 | Rockets | 3–1 | Rockets, 2–0 | Tie, 1–1 | Spurs; 129–112 | |
| 2025–26 | Spurs | 3–1 | Tie, 1–1 | Spurs, 2–0 | Spurs; 132–113 | On November 7, 2025, at San Antonio, the Spurs beat the Rockets 121–110 during the 2025 NBA Cup group stage. Spurs win the Southwest Division. Spurs lose 2025 NBA Cup championship game. Spurs lose 2026 NBA Finals. |
| 2026–27 | Rockets | 1–0 | March 5th and 16th, 2027 | Rockets, 1–0 | Spurs; 132–114 | First game at San Antonio was played in the Moody Center. |

Summary of Results

| Season | Season series | | at Houston Rockets | at San Antonio Spurs | Notes |
|---|---|---|---|---|---|
| Regular season games | Spurs | 122–102 | Rockets, 65–46 | Spurs, 76–37 | |
| Postseason games | Rockets | 12–10 | Spurs, 6–5 | Rockets, 7–4 | |
| Postseason series | Rockets | 3–1 | Rockets, 1–0 | Rockets, 2–1 | Eastern Conference First Round: 1980; Western Conference Semifinals: 1981, 2017; Western Conference Finals: 1995 |
| Regular and postseason | Spurs | 132–114 | Rockets, 70–52 | Spurs, 80–44 | There was 1 game played at a neutral site, at Moody Center on October 23rd, 2026. |
