= Antwuan Jackson =

American football player (born 1997)

Antwuan Jackson Jr.
Profile
- Position: Defensive end

Personal information
- Born: September 21, 1997 (age 29); Ellenwood, Georgia, U.S.
- Listed height: 6 ft 2 in (1.88 m)
- Listed weight: 320 lb (145 kg)

Career information
- High school: Cedar Grove (Ellenwood, Georgia)
- College: Auburn (2016); Blinn College (2017); Ohio State (2019–2021)
- NFL draft: 2022: undrafted

Career history
- Seattle Sea Dragons (2023); Carolina Panthers (2023)*; St. Louis Battlehawks (2024); Memphis Showboats (2025); Dallas Renegades (2026)
- * Offseason or practice squad member only
- Stats at Pro Football Reference

Antwuan Jackson Jr. (born September 21, 1997) is an American professional football defensive end. He played college football at Ohio State.

== Early life ==
Jackson grew up in Ellenwood, Georgia, and attended Cedar Grove High School. In his high school career, he tallied 47 tackles, 18 being for a loss, five sacks, a fumble recovery, and a forced fumble. He also rushed for two touchdowns on offense. Jackson also played baseball having a .316 career batting average with 25 hits, 25 RBIs, and 18 stolen basses. Jackson was also an Army All-American in high school. Jackson would decide to commit to play college football at the University of Auburn over other school such as Georgia, Florida, and Ohio State.

== College career ==
In Jackson's first year at Auburn he would be redshirted and would not play in the 2016 season. After Jackson's redshirt season he announced that he would transfer away from the program. Jackson would decide to sign with Blinn College due to not being allowed to transfer to other SEC schools or Ohio State for the 2017 season. During his time with Blinn College he played in 10 games putting up 70 tackles, nine sacks, and three forced fumbles. After his one-year stint at Blinn, Jackson would decide to head up north to the University of Ohio State. Jackson would go on to play at Ohio State for three years. In those three years, Jackson put up 47 tackles, nine going for a loss, and 3.5 sacks. Jackson's best season came in his senior year in 2021 where he totalled 23 tackles, 4.5 going for a loss, and 2.5 sacks. For his performance on the year he was named an Honorable Mention All Big-Ten.

== Professional career ==
Pre-draft measurables
| Height | Weight | Arm length | Hand span | Wingspan | 40-yard dash | 10-yard split | 20-yard split | 20-yard shuttle | Three-cone drill | Vertical jump | Broad jump | Bench press |
|---|---|---|---|---|---|---|---|---|---|---|---|---|
| 6 ft 2 1/8 in (1.88 m) | 298 lb (135 kg) | 31 7/8 in (0.81 m) | 9 1/4 in (0.23 m) | 6 ft 5 1/4 in (1.96 m) | 5.16 s | 1.75 s | 2.91 s | 4.90 s | 7.94 s | 28.0 in (0.71 m) | 7 ft 10 in (2.39 m) | 22 reps |
All values from Pro Day

=== Seattle Sea Dragons (first stint) ===
After not being selected in the 2022 NFL draft, Jackson was invited to the New York Giants' rookie minicamp but was not signed by them. However, Jackson was selected in the ninth round of the 2023 XFL draft by the Seattle Sea Dragons. During his time with Seattle, he played in nine games, starting in eight of them, in which he had 20 tackles on the year.

=== Carolina Panthers ===
After the 2023 XFL season, Jackson received an invitation to tryout for the Carolina Panthers. Jackson subsequently signed a contract with the Panthers. He was waived on August 26, 2023.

=== Seattle Sea Dragons (second stint) ===
On December 19, 2023, Jackson re-signed with the Seattle Sea Dragons. The Sea Dragons folded when the XFL and USFL merged to create the United Football League (UFL).

=== St. Louis Battlehawks ===
On January 5, 2024, Jackson was selected by the St. Louis Battlehawks during the 2024 UFL dispersal draft.

=== Memphis Showboats ===
On March 4, 2025, Jackson signed with the Memphis Showboats of the United Football League (UFL).

=== Dallas Renegades ===
On January 13, 2026, Jackson was selected by the Dallas Renegades in the 2026 UFL Draft.
