= Kayin Lee =

American football player (born 2004)

No. 14 – Tennessee Volunteers
- Position: Cornerback
- Class: Senior

Personal information
- Born: October 2, 2004 (age 22)
- Listed height: 5 ft 11 in (1.80 m)
- Listed weight: 191 lb (87 kg)

Career information
- High school: Cedar Grove (Ellenwood, Georgia)
- College: Auburn (2023–2025); Tennessee (2026–present)
- Stats at ESPN

Kayin Lee (born October 2, 2004) is an American football cornerback for the Tennessee Volunteers. He previously played for the Auburn Tigers.

== Early life ==
Lee attended Cedar Grove High School in Ellenwood, Georgia. He played in the 2023 All-American Bowl. He originally committed to play college football at the University of Georgia and Ohio State University before flipping his commitment to the University of Auburn on signing day.

== College career ==
As a true freshman at Auburn in 2023, Lee competed for immediate playing time. He played in all 13 games with four starts and had 18 tackles. As a sophomore in 2024, he started 10 of 11 games, recording 32 tackles and two interceptions. Lee started 11 of 12 games his junior year in 2025, finishing with 31 tackles and one interceptions. After the season, he entered the transfer portal and transferred to the University of Tennessee. Lee his first year at Tennessee in 2026 as a starter.
