= Alphonso Smith (disambiguation) =

Alphonso Smith (1985–2026) was an American football player who was a cornerback.

Alphonso Smith may also refer to:

- Alphonso C. Smith (1894–1945), Canadian politician
- C. Alphonso Smith (1864–1924), American professor of English

== See also ==
- Alfonso Smith (born 1987), American football running back
- Alfonso Smith Jr. or Al Smith (born 1962), American soccer player
