= DeAngelo Malone =

American football player (born 1999)

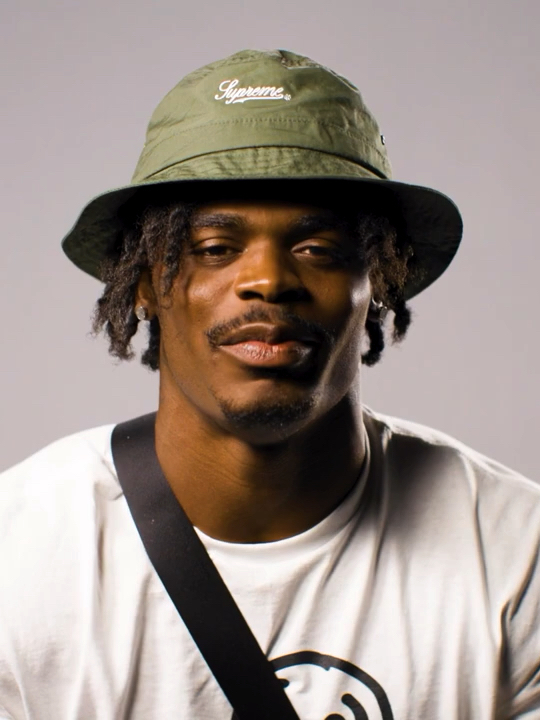
- Malone in 2022

No. 50 – Atlanta Falcons
- Position: Defensive end
- Roster status: Physically unable to perform

Personal information
- Born: July 12, 1999 (age 27); Atlanta, Georgia, U.S.
- Listed height: 6 ft 3 in (1.91 m)
- Listed weight: 235 lb (107 kg)

Career information
- High school: Cedar Grove (Ellenwood, Georgia)
- College: Western Kentucky (2017–2021)
- NFL draft: 2022: 3rd round, 82nd overall pick

Career history
- Atlanta Falcons (2022–present)

Awards and highlights
- 2× C-USA Defensive Player of the Year (2019, 2021); 3× First-team All-C-USA (2019–2021)

Career NFL statistics as of 2025
- Total tackles: 59
- Sacks: 3
- Pass deflections: 1
- Interceptionss: 1
- Stats at Pro Football Reference

DeAngelo Malone (born July 12, 1999) is an American professional football defensive end for the Atlanta Falcons of the National Football League (NFL). He played college football for the Western Kentucky Hilltoppers.

== Early life ==
Malone grew up in Ellenwood, Georgia and originally attended Martin Luther King Jr. High School before transferring to Cedar Grove High School. He recorded 49 tackles with eight tackles for loss and was named first-team All-State and All-Metro by The Atlanta Journal-Constitution as Cedar Grove won the AAA state championship. Rated a three-star recruit, Malone committed to play college football at Western Kentucky over an offer from Buffalo.

== College career ==
Malone became a starter for the Western Kentucky Hilltoppers during his freshman year and recorded 25 tackles, 1.5 sacks and five quarterback hurries. As a sophomore, he was named honorable mention All-Conference USA (C-USA)after finishing the season with 60 tackles, nine tackles for loss, six sacks, and eight quarterback hurries with two forced fumbles. In his junior season, Malone made 99 total tackles and was fourth in the nation with tackles 21 for loss and 12th in the nation with 11.5 sacks and also had 16 quarterback hurries and a fumble recovery returned for a touchdown. He was named the C-USA Defensive Player of the Year and first-team All-C-USA.

Malone considered entering the 2020 NFL draft, but ultimately decided to return for his senior year. Malone entered senior season on the Chuck Bednarik Award and Bronko Nagurski Trophy watchlists and was named the preseason C-USA Defensive Player of the Year and as one of the top five outside linebacker prospects for the 2021 NFL draft according to ESPN.

== Professional career ==
Pre-draft measurables
Height	Weight	Arm length	Hand span	Wingspan	40-yard dash	10-yard split	20-yard split	20-yard shuttle	Three-cone drill	Vertical jump	Broad jump	Bench press
6 ft 3 1/4 in (1.91 m)	243 lb (110 kg)	33 1/8 in (0.84 m)	9 7/8 in (0.25 m)	6 ft 7 3/8 in (2.02 m)	4.60 s	1.60 s	2.69 s	4.36 s	7.06 s	35.5 in (0.90 m)	9 ft 11 in (3.02 m)	23 reps
All values from NFL Combine/Pro Day

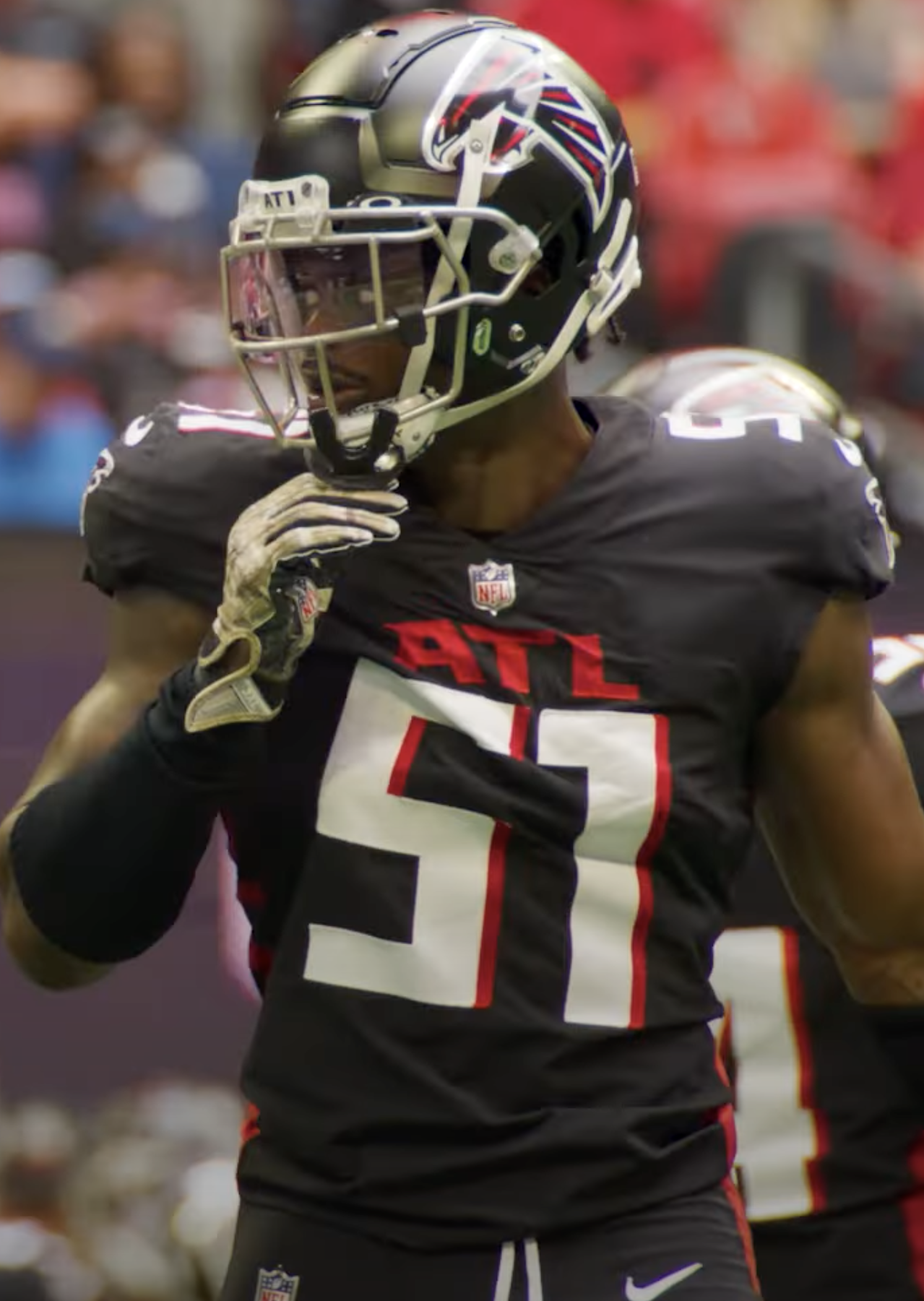
Malone in his rookie season.

Malone was selected in the third round with the 82nd pick by the Atlanta Falcons in the 2022 NFL draft. The Falcons previously obtained the pick in the trade that sent Matt Ryan to the Indianapolis Colts. Malone recorded his first professional sack in Week 7 against the Cincinnati Bengals.

Malone began the 2025 season as one of Atlanta’s auxiliary defensive ends. In Week 6 against the Buffalo Bills, Malone recorded his first career interception against Josh Allen, helping secure the 24–14 win. On November 13, 2025, Malone was placed on injured reserve due to an ankle injury he suffered in Week 10 against the Indianapolis Colts.

On April 1, 2026, Malone re-signed with the Falcons on a one-year contract. He was placed on the reserve/physically unable to perform list on August 4, ending his season.

== NFL career statistics ==
=== Regular season ===
Year	Team	Games		Tackles					Fumbles		Interceptions			
Year	Team	GP	GS	Cmb	Solo	Ast	Sck	TfL	FF	FR	Int	Yds	TD	PD
2022	ATL	15	0	29	18	11	1.0	4	0	0	0	0	0	0
2023	ATL	17	0	6	4	2	0.0	0	0	0	0	0	0	0
2024	ATL	17	0	16	8	8	2.0	3	0	0	0	0	0	0
2025	ATL	9	0	8	2	6	0.0	0	0	0	1	6	0	1
Career		58	0	59	32	29	3.0	7	0	0	1	6	0	1

== Personal life ==
Malone is first cousins with Justin Shaffer, who was also selected by the Falcons in the 2022 NFL draft.
