= Dion Glover =

American basketball player (born 1978)

Grand Rapids Drive
- Title: Assistant coach
- League: NBA G League

Personal information
- Born: October 22, 1978 (age 48) Marietta, Georgia, U.S.
- Listed height: 6 ft 5 in (1.96 m)
- Listed weight: 225 lb (102 kg)

Career information
- High school: Cedar Grove (Ellenwood, Georgia)
- College: Georgia Tech (1997–1998)
- NBA draft: 1999: 1st round, 20th overall pick
- Drafted by: Atlanta Hawks
- Playing career: 1999–2008
- Position: Shooting guard
- Number: 5, 22, 1

Career history

Playing
- 1999–2004: Atlanta Hawks
- 2004: Toronto Raptors
- 2004–2005: Ülkerspor
- 2005: San Antonio Spurs
- 2006–2007: Champville SC
- 2007: Bakersfield Jam
- 2007: Al Riyadi
- 2007: CPN Pueblo Nuevo
- 2007: Naco
- 2008: Gaiteros del Zulia

Coaching
- 2014–present: Grand Rapids Drive (assistant)

Career highlights
- Lebanese League champion (2007); McDonald's All-American (1997); First-team Parade All-American (1997); Mr. Georgia Basketball (1997)
- Stats at NBA.com
- Stats at Basketball Reference
Medals
Men's basketball
Representing United States
Goodwill Games
Gold medal – first place	1998 New York	Team competition

Micaiah Diondae "Dion" Glover (born October 22, 1978) is an American former professional basketball player and coach who played in the National Basketball Association (NBA). He was a member of the BIG3 basketball league's inaugural championship team, "Trilogy".

== Early life ==
Glover was born on October 22, 1978 in Marietta, Georgia. He attended the Cedar Grove High School in Ellenwood, Georgia, and then attended the Georgia Institute of Technology.

== Basketball career ==
A McDonald's All-American, the 6'5" shooting guard Glover was selected by the Atlanta Hawks with the 20th overall pick of the 1999 NBA draft, from Georgia Tech. He played for the Hawks until February 2004, posting career-high averages in 2003–04: 10 points, four rebounds and two assists, with the team failing to make the playoffs.

After being waived by the Hawks, Glover played with the Toronto Raptors, then appeared in seven regular season games with the San Antonio Spurs, during the 2004–05 season.

On December 5, 2005, he was waived by the Houston Rockets (no competitive games played), and played overseas in Turkey, Lebanon, Israel and the Dominican Republic before retiring.

He was an assistant coach for the Grand Rapids Drive of the NBA G League.

== Outside basketball ==
Glover created the Dion Glover Foundation in 2000. A non-profit organization, it operates only on the support of charitable contributions and donations for educational, medical and scientific purposes, all being devoted to youth aid and development.
