= 13 points in 35 seconds =

Iconic NBA comeback by Tracy McGrady

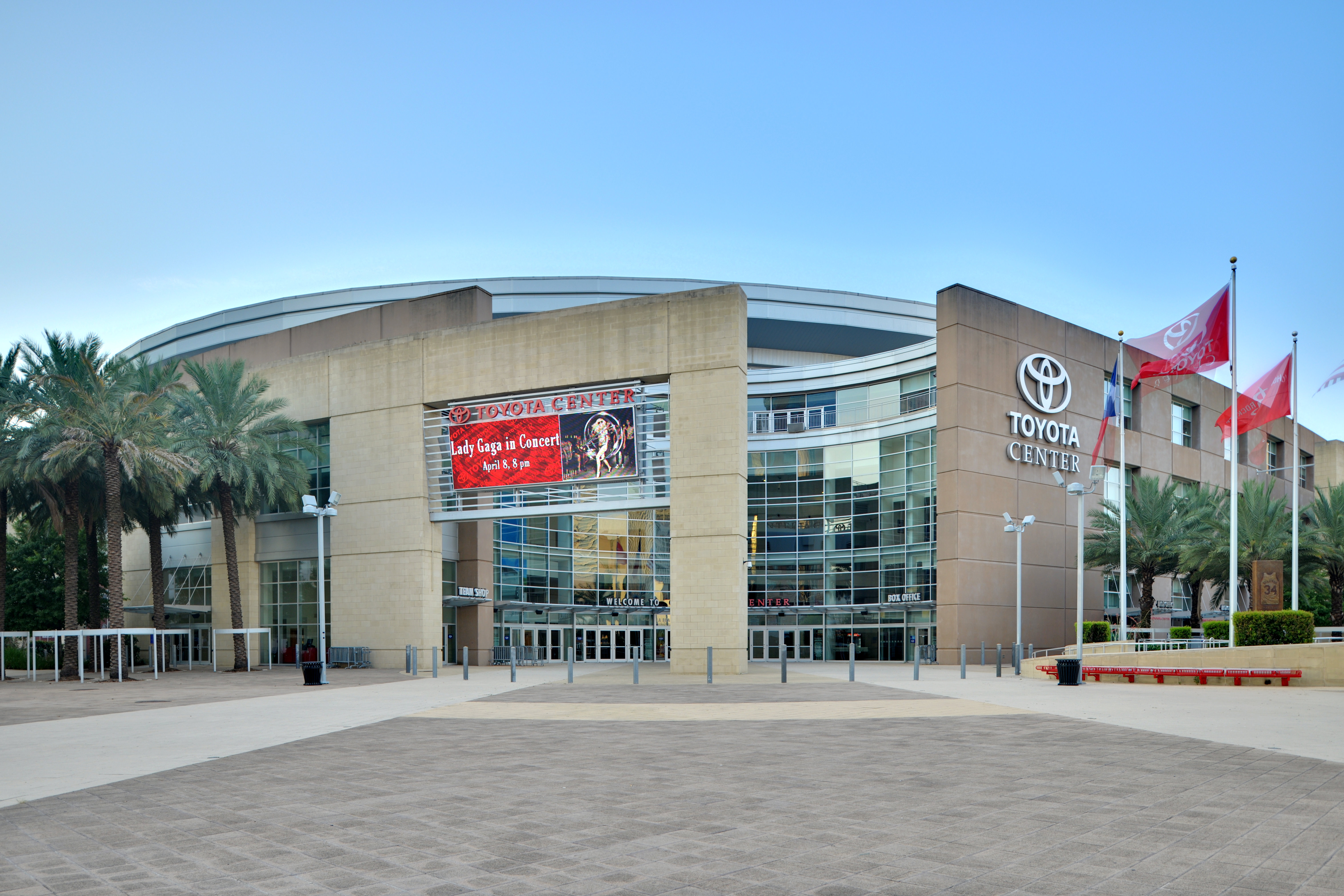
- The Toyota Center in Houston, where the game took place.
San Antonio Spurs	Houston Rockets
80	81
Head coach: Gregg Popovich	Head coach: Jeff Van Gundy
	1	2	3	4	Total
San Antonio Spurs	12	22	24	22	80
Houston Rockets	18	20	16	27	81
- Venue: Toyota Center, Houston, Texas
- Referees: Derrick Stafford; Jason Phillips; Tom Washington

In the National Basketball Association (NBA), 13 points in 35 seconds refers to the final 35 seconds of a match on December 9, 2004, where Houston Rockets player Tracy McGrady scored 13 points to narrowly beat the San Antonio Spurs 81–80 in what is regarded as one of the greatest comebacks in NBA history. The game was televised nationally in primetime on TNT.

His sequence included four consecutive three-pointers, one of which was part of a four-point play and the last of which was the game-winner in the final two seconds. This comeback became one of McGrady's most memorable performances. On the Young Man and Three podcast, McGrady stated, “I was struggling shooting the ball [that] game for three quarters. 4th quarter come, 35 seconds left, bro. I don’t know what came over. I literally don’t know what came over.”

== Background ==
On December 9, 2004, at the last 35 seconds of the Houston Rockets against the San Antonio Spurs, the Rockets were down 76–68, with the Spurs having the upper hand. Having led at the half, the Rockets trailed after a dominant third quarter by the Spurs. After Devin Brown made two free throws to put the Spurs up by 8, McGrady made his first three-point shot at exactly 35 seconds remaining in the game. Brown then made two more free throws, and McGrady responded with another three-pointer, drawing the foul and making the free throw to complete the four-point play. Tim Duncan of the Spurs responded with two made free throws to put his team up 80–75 with 16 seconds remaining. McGrady then made a three-point shot at 11 seconds and his final three-point shot with only 1.7 seconds remaining in the game to seal the win for the Rockets, totaling 13 points in 35 seconds.

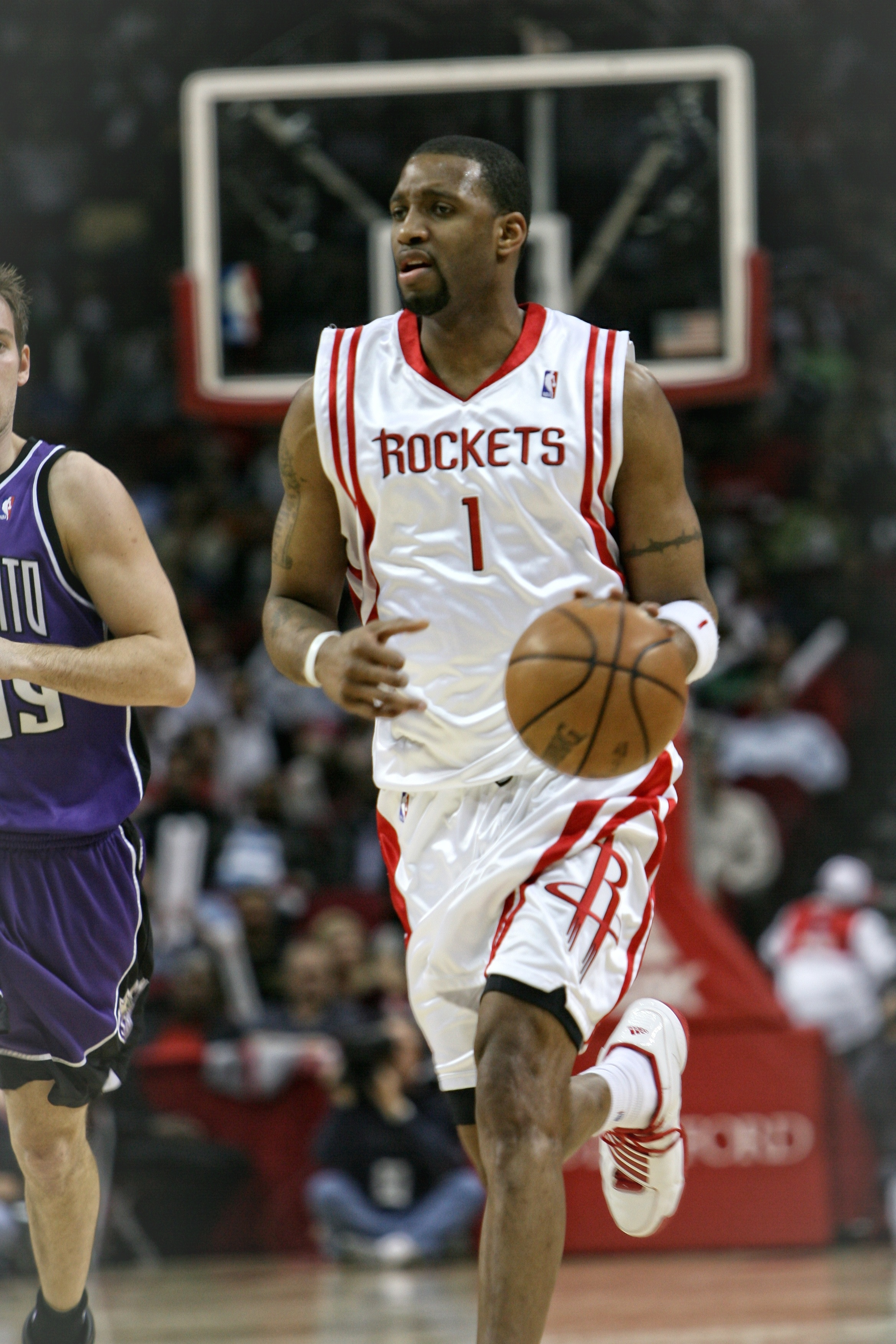
Tracy McGrady in 2008

After the win, McGrady stated, "[I was] just thinking, 'Don't quit. Just get the ball up and just try to get a shot off. When they take the ball out, try to get a steal. And if we don't get a steal, foul and put them on the free-throw line.'" He stated, "The basketball gods were talking to me that night. [I was] dribbling the ball up the court and [I was] looking for [my] spot, head down and pop! Game over," after which, McGrady described the experience as an "out-of-body experience" and that he could not repeat it even if he wanted to.

== Statistics ==
Southwest Division	W	L	PCT	GB	Home	Road	Div
y-San Antonio Spurs	59	23	.720	–	38–3	21–20	10–6
x-Dallas Mavericks	58	24	.707	1	29–12	29–12	11–5
x-Houston Rockets	51	31	.622	8	26–15	25–16	10–6
x-Memphis Grizzlies	45	37	.549	14	26–15	19–22	7–9
e-New Orleans Hornets	18	64	.220	41	11–30	7–34	2–14

== See also ==
- Rockets–Spurs rivalry
