= Justin Shaffer =

American football player (born 1998)

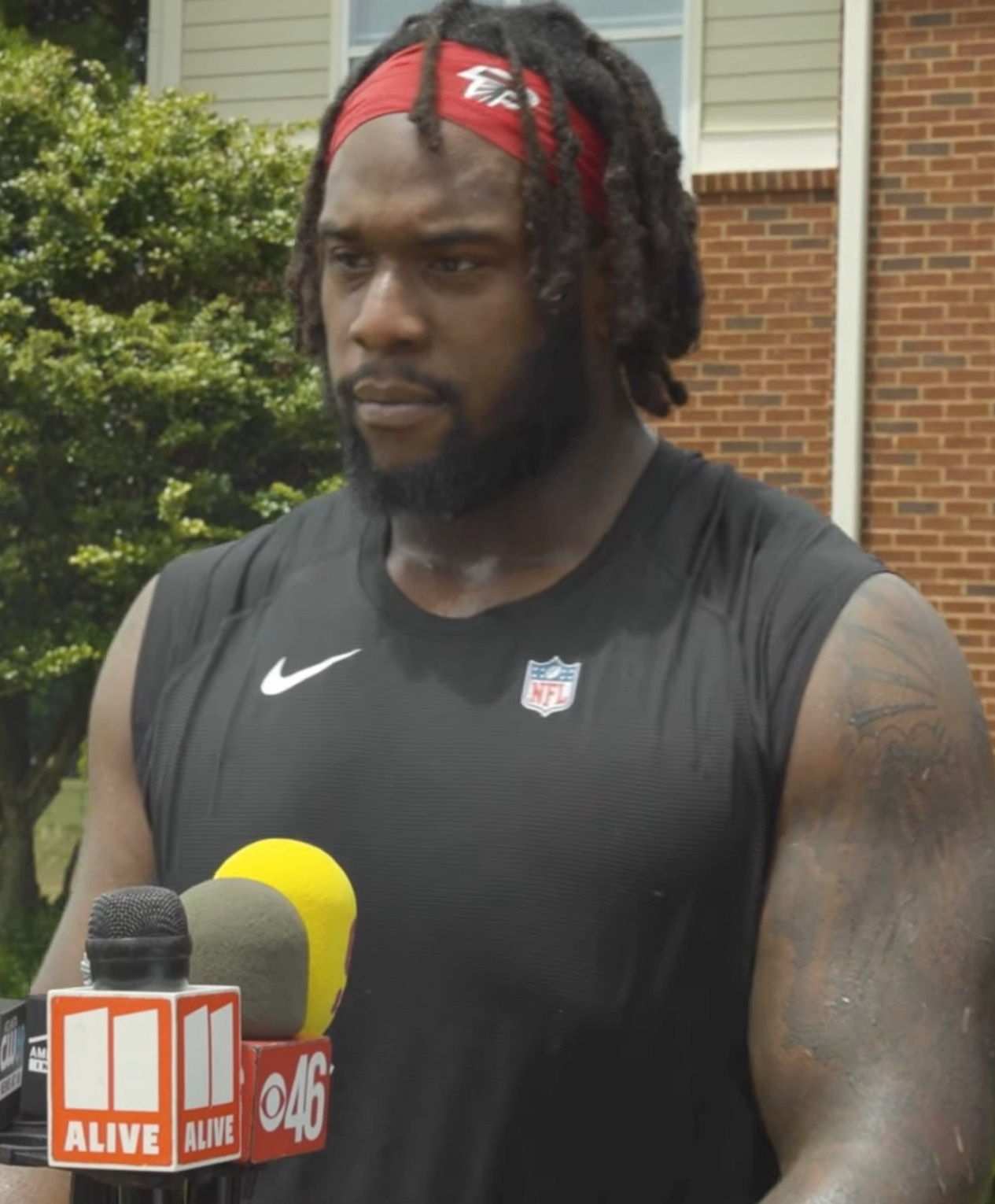
- Shaffer in 2022

Profile
- Position: Guard

Personal information
- Born: June 20, 1998 (age 28); Ellenwood, Georgia, U.S.
- Listed height: 6 ft 4 in (1.93 m)
- Listed weight: 317 lb (144 kg)

Career information
- High school: Cedar Grove (Ellenwood)
- College: Georgia (2017–2021)
- NFL draft: 2022: 6th round, 190th overall pick

Career history
- Atlanta Falcons (2022–2023)*; San Antonio Brahmas (2025)*
- * Offseason or practice squad member only

Awards and highlights
- CFP national champion (2021); Second-team All-SEC (2021)
- Stats at Pro Football Reference

Justin Donnnell Shaffer (born June 20, 1998) is an American professional football guard. He was selected by the Atlanta Falcons in the sixth round of the 2022 NFL draft after playing college football at Georgia.

== Early life ==
Shaffer grew up in Ellenwood, Georgia and attended Cedar Grove High School. He was rated a three-star recruit and initially committed to play college football at Louisville during his junior year. Shaffer flipped his commitment to Georgia shortly before National Signing Day.

== College career ==
Shaffer saw playing time as a reserve offensive lineman as a freshman and sophomore. He made his first career start as a junior against Tennessee and started the next game before suffering a season-ending neck injury. Shaffer started all of the Bulldogs' regular season games at left tackle and started in the 2021 Peach Bowl at left guard. Shaffer decided to utilize the extra year of eligibility granted to college athletes who played in the 2020 season due to the coronavirus pandemic and return to Georgia for a fifth season.

== Professional career ==
Pre-draft measurables
Height	Weight	Arm length	Hand span	Wingspan	40-yard dash	10-yard split	20-yard split	20-yard shuttle	Three-cone drill	Vertical jump	Broad jump	Bench press
6 ft 3 7/8 in (1.93 m)	314 lb (142 kg)	33 1/4 in (0.84 m)	10 in (0.25 m)	6 ft 8 5/8 in (2.05 m)	5.14 s	1.72 s	2.92 s	4.85 s	8.09 s	25.5 in (0.65 m)	8 ft 11 in (2.72 m)	23 reps
All values from NFL Combine/Pro Day

=== Atlanta Falcons ===
Shaffer was selected in the sixth round with the 190th pick by the Atlanta Falcons in the 2022 NFL draft. He was waived on August 30 and re-signed to the practice squad. He signed a reserve/future contract on January 9, 2023.

On August 29, 2023, Shaffer was waived by the Falcons and re-signed to the practice squad. Following the end of the 2023 regular season, he signed a reserve/future contract on January 10, 2024. Shaffer was released by the Falcons on March 28.

=== San Antonio Brahmas ===
On October 21, 2024, Shaffer was signed by the San Antonio Brahmas of the United Football League (UFL). He was released on March 20, 2025.

== Personal life ==
Shaffer is first cousins with DeAngelo Malone, who was also selected by the Falcons in the 2022 NFL draft.
