= Roger Harper (American football) =

American gridiron football player (born 1970)

No. 47, 24
- Position: Safety

Personal information
- Born: October 26, 1970 (age 56); Columbus, Ohio, U.S.
- Listed height: 6 ft 2 in (1.88 m)
- Listed weight: 225 lb (102 kg)

Career information
- High school: Independence (Columbus)
- College: Ohio State
- NFL draft: 1993: 2nd round, 38th overall pick

Career history
- Atlanta Falcons (1993–1995); Dallas Cowboys (1996); Green Bay Packers (1998)*; BC Lions (1999)
- * Offseason or practice squad member only

Awards and highlights
- PFWA All-Rookie Team (1993); 2× First-team All-Big Ten (1992, 1993)

Career NFL statistics
- Games played: 56
- Interceptions: 4
- Sacks: 1
- Fumble recoveries: 1
- Stats at Pro Football Reference

Roger Michael Harper (born October 26, 1970) is an American former professional football player who was a safety in the National Football League (NFL) for the Atlanta Falcons and Dallas Cowboys. He also was a member of the BC Lions in the Canadian Football League (CFL). He played college football for the Ohio State Buckeyes.

== Early life ==
Harper attended Independence High School. As a senior wingback, he gained over 1,600 yards in total offense with an average of 16.5 yards-per-reception. He received All-Ohio honors and was awarded the James A. Rhodes Trophy.

He was also an All-state basketball player.

== College career ==
He accepted a football scholarship from Ohio State University. He became a starter as a sophomore, tying for the team lead with 3 interceptions, including returning a Drew Bledsoe pass for a 42-yard touchdown against Washington State University.

As a junior, he led the team with 4 interceptions. At the end of the season, he declared his intention to enter the NFL draft. He finished his college career with 118 tackles (75 solo) and 7 interceptions.

== Professional career ==
=== Atlanta Falcons ===
Harper was selected by the Atlanta Falcons in the second round (38th overall) of the 1993 NFL draft. As a rookie, he was named the starter at strong safety in the fourth game against the Pittsburgh Steelers. He posted 112 defensive tackles (fifth on the team), 5 quarterback pressures, 2 passes defensed, 15 special teams tackles (fourth on the team) and was named to the NFL's All-rookie team.

In 1994, he was moved to free safety and suffered a fractured right forearm against the New Orleans Saints, causing him to miss the last 6 games. He collected 57 tackles, 3 quarterback pressures, 3 passes defensed and one interception.

In 1995, he started the first 12 games at free safety, recording 77 tackles, 2 quarterback pressures, one interception and one forced fumble. On April 18, 1996, he was traded to the Dallas Cowboys in exchange for a fourth (#127-Juran Bolden) and a fifth round draft choice (#164-Gary Bandy).

=== Dallas Cowboys ===
Harper missed the first 2 games of the 1996 season with a fracture in his right forearm, that he suffered during the Blue-White scrimmage in training camp. After safety George Teague was signed in the preseason, he was used mostly on the nickel defense, posting 33 defensive tackles, 5 passes defensed, one forced fumble and 11 special teams tackles. He was released on August 17, 1997.

=== Green Bay Packers ===
On February 23, 1998, Harper was signed as a free agent by the Green Bay Packers. He was released on May 4.

=== BC Lions ===
In 1999, he signed with the BC Lions of the Canadian Football League.
