= Independence High School (Columbus, Ohio) =

Public high school in Columbus, Ohio, United States

Location
- 5175 Refugee Road; Columbus, (Franklin County), Ohio 43232; United States; 39°55′11″N 82°51′16″W

Information
- Type: Public high school
- School district: Columbus City Schools
- Superintendent: Angela Chapman
- Principal: Donis Toler
- Teaching staff: 41.00 (FTE)
- Grades: 9–12
- Student to teacher ratio: 16.49
- Colors: Red, white and blue
- Athletics conference: Columbus City League
- Mascot: 76ers
- Team name: 76ers
- Rival: Walnut Ridge High School
- Accreditation: North Central Association of Colleges and Schools
- Website: Website

Independence High School is a public high school located at 5175 E. Refugee Road, Columbus, Ohio. It is a part of Columbus City Schools.

The school colors are red, white and blue. The school nickname is the 76ers.

== Notable alumni ==
- Joe Cooper (1997), Ohio State and Calgary Stampeders linebacker
- Eric Crozier, former Major League Baseball player, Toronto Blue Jays
- Kenny Gregory (1997), basketball player, University of Kansas
- Roger Harper, former National Football League player, Dallas Cowboys and Atlanta Falcons
- DeAngelo Smith (2004), former National Football League player, Cleveland Browns
