= Kenny Gregory =

American basketball player (born 1978)

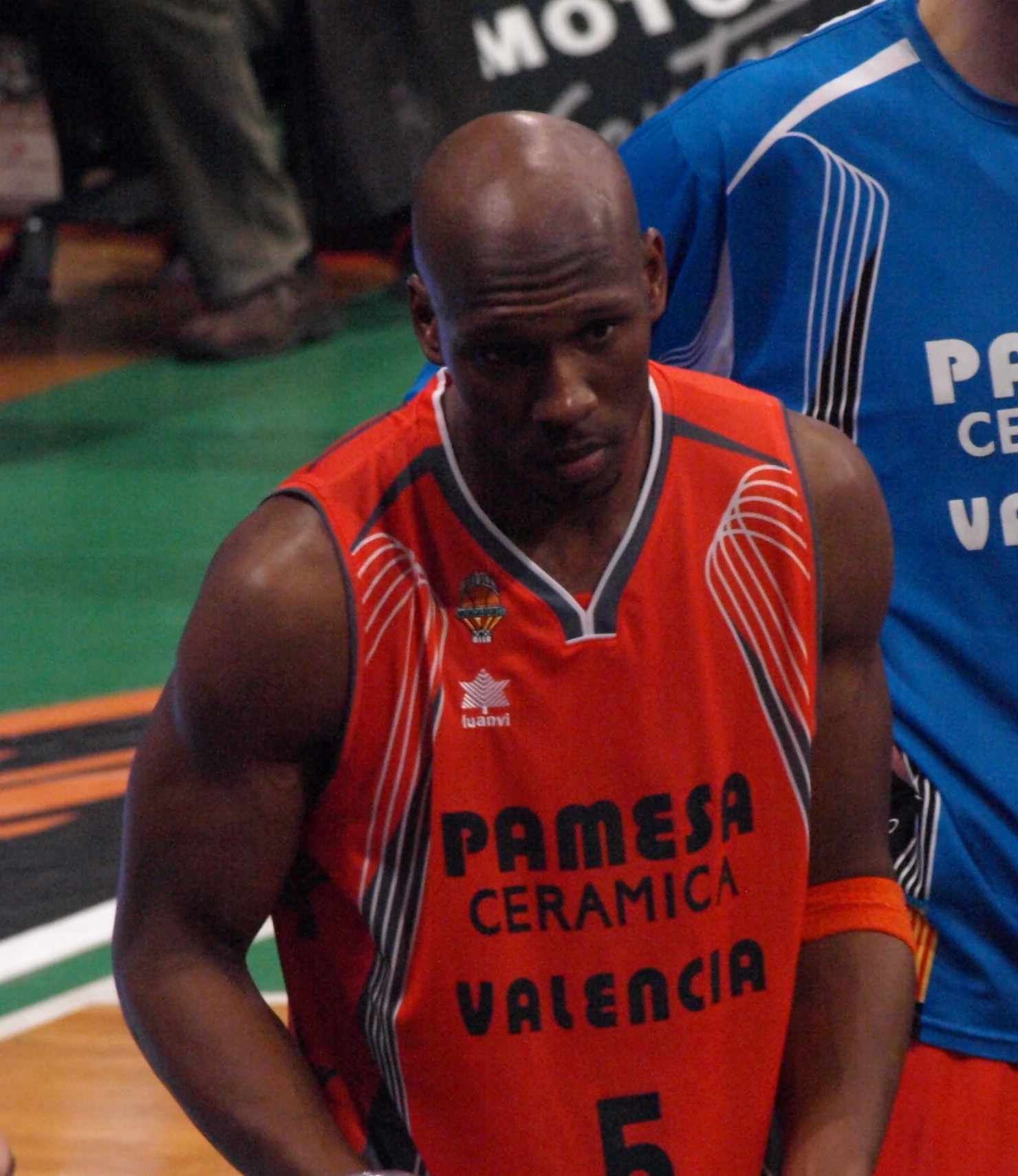
- Gregory with Pamesa Valencia in 2009

Personal information
- Born: November 16, 1978 (age 47) Columbus, Ohio, U.S.
- Listed height: 6 ft 4 in (1.93 m)
- Listed weight: 210 lb (95 kg)

Career information
- High school: Independence (Columbus, Ohio)
- College: Kansas (1997–2001)
- NBA draft: 2001: undrafted
- Playing career: 2001–2011
- Position: Shooting guard / small forward

Career history
- 2001–2002: Greenville Groove
- 2002: Dodge City Legend
- 2002–2003: Chester Jets
- 2003–2005: Nuova Pallacanestro Pavia
- 2005–2007: Le Mans Sarthe
- 2007–2008: Efes Pilsen
- 2008–2009: PAOK
- 2009: Pamesa Valencia
- 2009–2010: PAOK
- 2010–2011: Union Olimpija
- 2011: SLUC Nancy

Career highlights
- French League champion (2006); Semaine des As winner (2006); Slovenian Cup winner (2011); 2× French League All-Star (2006, 2007); Greek League All-Star (2010); All-USBL First Team (2002); 2× Second-team All-Big 12 (2000, 2001); McDonald's All-American Game MVP (1997); Fourth-team Parade All-American (1997); Ohio Mr. Basketball (1997)

William Kendrick Gregory (born November 16, 1978) is an American former professional basketball player. He played the shooting guard and small forward positions. He is 6 ft 4 in (1.93 m) in height.

== Amateur career ==
Mr. Ohio, Gregory played high-school basketball at Independence High School in Columbus, Ohio. He played college basketball at the University of Kansas, where he played with the Kansas Jayhawks men's basketball team from 1997 to 2001.

== Professional career ==
Despite a very large wingspan for a guard of 6 ft 11 in (2.11 m) and some very impressive athletic scores at the 2001 NBA pre-draft camp, such as recording the highest no-step vertical jump (40") and the highest maximum vertical jump (46") that have ever been measured at the camp, Gregory went undrafted in the 2001 NBA draft.

Gregory was then signed for the 2001–02 season by the Greenville Groove of the D-League. He played the 2002 summer season with the Dodge City Legend in the United States Basketball League before moving to the British Basketball League for the 2002–03 season, where he played with the Chester Jets. He then moved to Italy for the 2003–04 season to the team Nuova Pallacanestro Pavia, of the Italian Second Division League.

He moved to the French League for the 2005–06 season, to the team Le Mans Sarthe Basket. He played with Le Mans during the 2006–07 season as well. He then moved to the Turkish League for the 2007–08 season, where he played with Efes Pilsen S.K.

Gregory moved to the Greek League club PAOK BC for the 2008–09 season. In February 2009, and as PAOK BC was facing financial problems, he moved to the ACB to play for Pamesa Valencia, only to return to the Greek League in the summer of 2009, again for PAOK BC.

In September 2010 he signed with KK Union Olimpija.

In December 2011 he signed with SLUC Nancy Basket.
