= Tracy McGrady =

American basketball player (born 1979)

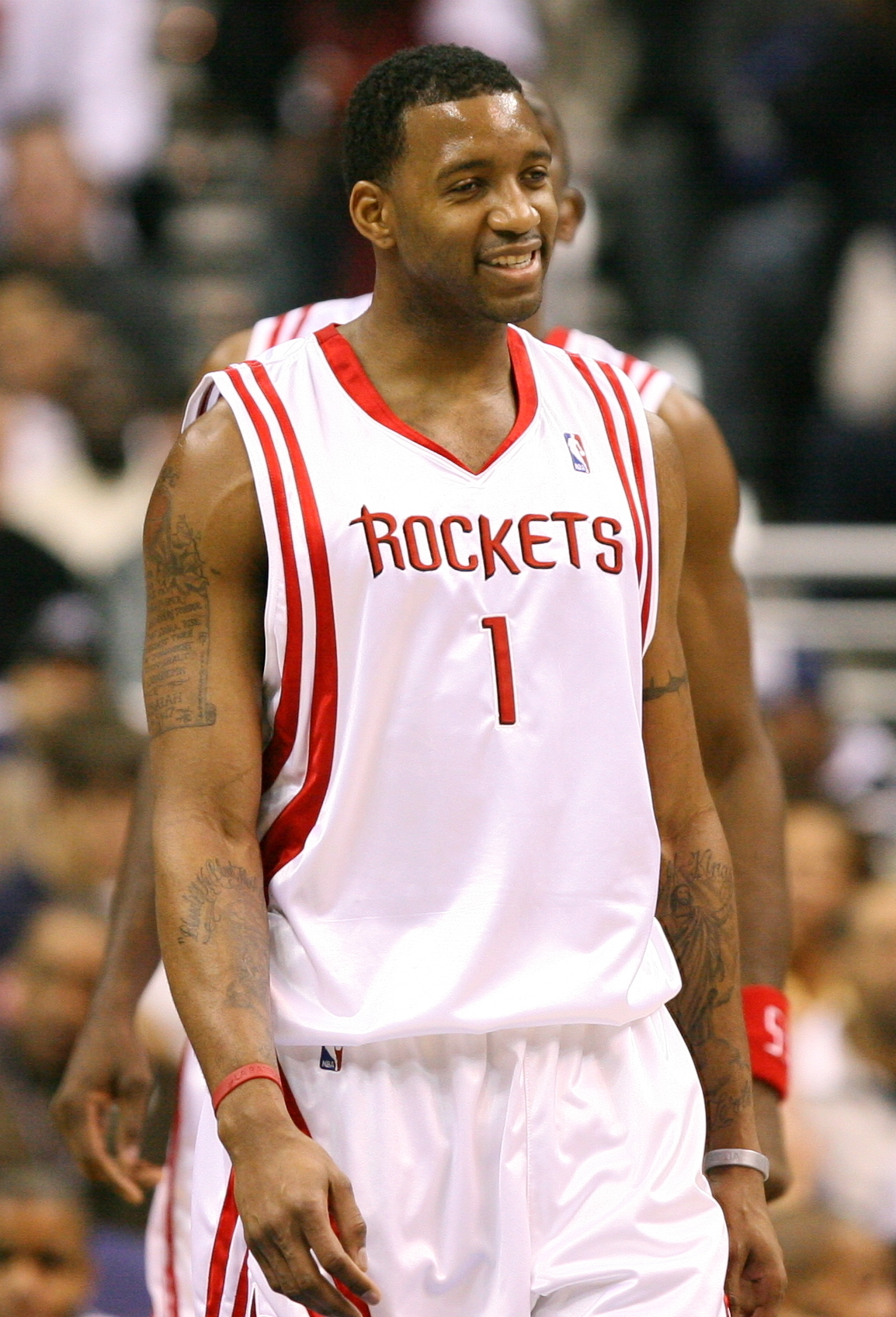
- McGrady with the Houston Rockets in 2006

Personal information
- Born: May 24, 1979 (age 47) Bartow, Florida, U.S.
- Listed height: 6 ft 8 in (2.03 m)
- Listed weight: 225 lb (102 kg)

Career information
- High school: Auburndale (Auburndale, Florida); Mount Zion Christian Academy (Durham, North Carolina)
- NBA draft: 1997: 1st round, 9th overall pick
- Drafted by: Toronto Raptors
- Playing career: 1997–2013
- Position: Shooting guard / small forward
- Number: 1, 3

Career history
- 1997–2000: Toronto Raptors
- 2000–2004: Orlando Magic
- 2004–2010: Houston Rockets
- 2010: New York Knicks
- 2010–2011: Detroit Pistons
- 2011–2012: Atlanta Hawks
- 2012–2013: Qingdao Eagles
- 2013: San Antonio Spurs

Career highlights
- 7× NBA All-Star (2001–2007); 2× All-NBA First Team (2002, 2003); 3× All-NBA Second Team (2001, 2004, 2007); 2× All-NBA Third Team (2005, 2008); 2× NBA scoring champion (2003, 2004); NBA Most Improved Player (2001); CBA All-Star (2013); No. 1 retired by Qingdao Eagles; Mr. Basketball USA (1997); USA Today High School Player of the Year (1997); McDonald's All-American (1997); First-team Parade All-American (1997)

Career statistics
- Points: 18,381 (19.6 ppg)
- Rebounds: 5,276 (5.6 rpg)
- Assists: 4,161 (4.4 apg)
- Stats at NBA.com
- Stats at Basketball Reference
- Basketball Hall of Fame
Medals
Men's basketball
Representing United States
FIBA Americas Championship
Gold medal – first place	2003 San Juan	Team competition

Tracy Lamar McGrady Jr. (born May 24, 1979), nicknamed T-Mac, is an American former professional basketball player, best known for his career in the National Basketball Association (NBA). McGrady is a seven-time NBA All-Star, seven-time All-NBA selection, two-time NBA scoring champion, and winner of the NBA Most Improved Player Award in 2001. He was inducted into the Naismith Memorial Basketball Hall of Fame as part of the Class of 2017. McGrady is regarded as one of the greatest scorers and shooting guards in NBA history.

McGrady entered the NBA straight out of high school and was selected as the ninth overall pick by the Toronto Raptors in the 1997 NBA draft. Beginning his career as a low-minute player, he gradually improved his role with the team, eventually forming a duo with his cousin Vince Carter. In 2000, he left the Raptors for the Orlando Magic, where he became one of the league's most prolific scorers and a candidate for the NBA Most Valuable Player Award. In 2004, he was traded to the Houston Rockets, where he paired with center Yao Ming to help the Rockets become a perennial playoff team. His final seasons in the NBA were plagued by injuries, and he retired in 2013 following brief stints with the Qingdao DoubleStar Eagles of the Chinese Basketball Association (CBA) and the San Antonio Spurs.

Since his retirement, McGrady has worked as a basketball analyst for ESPN. From April to July 2014, he realized his dream of playing professional baseball, pitching for the Sugar Land Skeeters of the Atlantic League of Professional Baseball.

== Early life ==
McGrady was born on May 24, 1979, in Bartow, Florida, to Melanise Williford. Because his father was not a part of their everyday lives, Melanise raised McGrady with the help of her mother, Roberta, in Auburndale. As a youth, McGrady played high school basketball and baseball at Auburndale High School for three years before transferring to Mount Zion Christian Academy in Durham, North Carolina for his senior season. During his final year at Auburndale, McGrady posted averages of 23.1 points, 12.2 rebounds, 4 assists, and 4.9 blocks per game.

A relatively unknown player coming out of Florida, McGrady made a name for himself after a strong performance at the Adidas ABCD Camp, an experience that helped him recognize his true talent. His defining play was a windmill dunk on highly-touted prospect James Felton. He later reflected, "Nobody had a clue who Tracy McGrady was. Sonny Vaccaro gave me that platform, and I played against the best players in the world at that time. I left that camp the No. 1 player in the nation, 175 to No. 1." Behind his leadership, Mt. Zion emerged as the number two-ranked team in the country, and McGrady was named a McDonald's All-American, USA Today High School Basketball Player of the Year, and North Carolina's Mr. Basketball by the Associated Press. He also played at the 1997 Roundball Classic, scoring 13 points. His senior year averages were 27.5 points, 8.7 rebounds, 7.7 assists, 2.8 steals, and 2 blocks per game. Initially, McGrady considered playing college basketball at the University of Kentucky, but he ultimately decided to enter the NBA draft as he was a projected lottery pick.

== Professional career ==
=== Toronto Raptors (1997–2000) ===
McGrady was selected as the ninth overall pick by the Toronto Raptors in the 1997 NBA draft. For most of the 1997–98 season, he received little playing time, averaging only 13 minutes per game under head coach Darrell Walker. McGrady described his rookie year as "hell", feeling lonely in Toronto and sleeping for up to 20 hours a day. Late in the season, Walker resigned, and McGrady began playing more under new coach Butch Carter, who agreed to increase McGrady's minutes on the condition that McGrady would improve his work ethic.

Before the lockout-shortened 1998–99 season, the Raptors drafted McGrady's second cousin once removed, Vince Carter. The two became inseparable; teammate Dee Brown once said, "They say they're cousins ... But Siamese twins is more like it."

By the 1999–2000 season, the duo had developed a reputation for their athleticism, giving memorable performances at the All-Star Weekend Slam Dunk Contest. McGrady, now playing significant minutes, was a contender for the Sixth Man of the Year Award before being elevated to Toronto's starting backcourt in late March. On April 4, in what would be one of his last regular season games in Toronto, McGrady scored a tenure-high 28 points in a loss against the Pistons. Behind McGrady and Carter's play, the Raptors finished the season with a 45–37 record, qualifying for the playoffs for the first time in franchise history. McGrady's final averages were 15.4 points, 6.3 rebounds, 3.3 assists, and a career-high 1.9 blocks per game. In the first round of the postseason, the Raptors were swept by the New York Knicks.

=== Orlando Magic (2000–2004) ===
==== 2000–01 season: First All-Star and Most Improved Player ====
Following Toronto's first-round exit, McGrady became a free agent and signed with the Orlando Magic on August 3, 2000, through a sign-and-trade deal that sent a future 2005 1st round draft pick (Fran Vázquez was later selected) to the Raptors. He signed a seven-year, $92.8 million contract with the Magic. He elected to join the Magic in part because he disliked his secondary role playing behind Vince Carter, in part so that he could return home to Florida, and in part to play with their other newly acquired free agent, Grant Hill. Hill would go on to play in only 47 games total throughout his tenure with the team, forcing McGrady into a more significant leadership and scoring role than anticipated.

During the 2000–01 season, McGrady defied the expectations of many, emerging as one of the best players in the NBA, with Milwaukee Bucks General Manager Ernie Grunfeld going so far as to call him "one of the top five talents in the league". McGrady's play earned him his first All-Star Game appearance and, behind averages of 26.8 points, 7.5 rebounds, and 4.6 assists per game, he was selected to his first All-NBA Team, being named to the All-NBA Second Team. He was also voted the league's Most Improved Player. With a 43–39 record, the Magic entered the playoffs as the East's seventh seed, drawing a matchup with the Bucks. In Game 3 of the series, McGrady notched 42 points, 10 rebounds, and 8 assists in a performance that Bill Simmons later called McGrady's "superstar audition tape". Orlando was eventually eliminated by Milwaukee in four games.

==== 2001–02 season: First All-NBA First Team selection ====
For the 2001–02 season, McGrady averaged 25.6 points, 7.9 rebounds, and 5.3 assists per game, earning his second All-NBA Team selection, this time to the All-NBA First Team. During that year's All-Star Game, he completed one of the most memorable highlights of his career, throwing the ball off the backboard to himself and completing an alley-oop in traffic. Reflecting on the play, McGrady later recounted, "There was only one guy back there ... and he bit on the lob ... I guess he thought I was throwing it to one of my teammates, and I just threw it down." At season's end, the Magic were again ousted in the first round of the playoffs, losing in four games to the Charlotte Hornets. On March 8, 2002, in one of the best games of his career, McGrady scored a season high 50 points and grabbed 10 rebounds in a 99–96 win over the Washington Wizards.

==== 2002–03 season: First scoring title and playoff disappointment ====
In 2002–03, McGrady won his first scoring title and, behind averages of 32.1 points, 6.5 rebounds, and 5.5 assists per game, finished a career-best fourth in NBA Most Valuable Player Award voting. ESPN later ranked his season one of the best ever for a perimeter player. In Game 1 of the playoffs, he scored a team playoff record 43 points to help Orlando take an early series lead against the top-seeded Detroit Pistons. The Magic would go on to take a commanding 3–1 lead, and McGrady made headlines when he prematurely assumed that Orlando were guaranteed to advance, replying in an interview, "It feels good to get in the second round." In that year, the first round of the NBA playoffs was changed to a best-of-seven series from a best-of-five. Despite holding the series lead, the Magic were eliminated in seven games.

==== 2003–04 season: Second scoring title and missing playoffs ====
The 2003–04 season was a tumultuous one for McGrady; Magic coach Doc Rivers was fired after a 1–10 start to the year and there were reports of friction between McGrady and Orlando General Manager John Weisbrod. Throughout the season, Orlando struggled because of a series of injuries, finishing the year with the worst record in the East despite McGrady winning his second consecutive scoring title. Late in the season, McGrady scored a career-high 62 points in a winning effort versus the Washington Wizards. His final averages were 28 points, 6 rebounds, and 5.5 assists per game.

=== Houston Rockets (2004–2010) ===
==== 2004–05 season: 13 points in 35 seconds ====
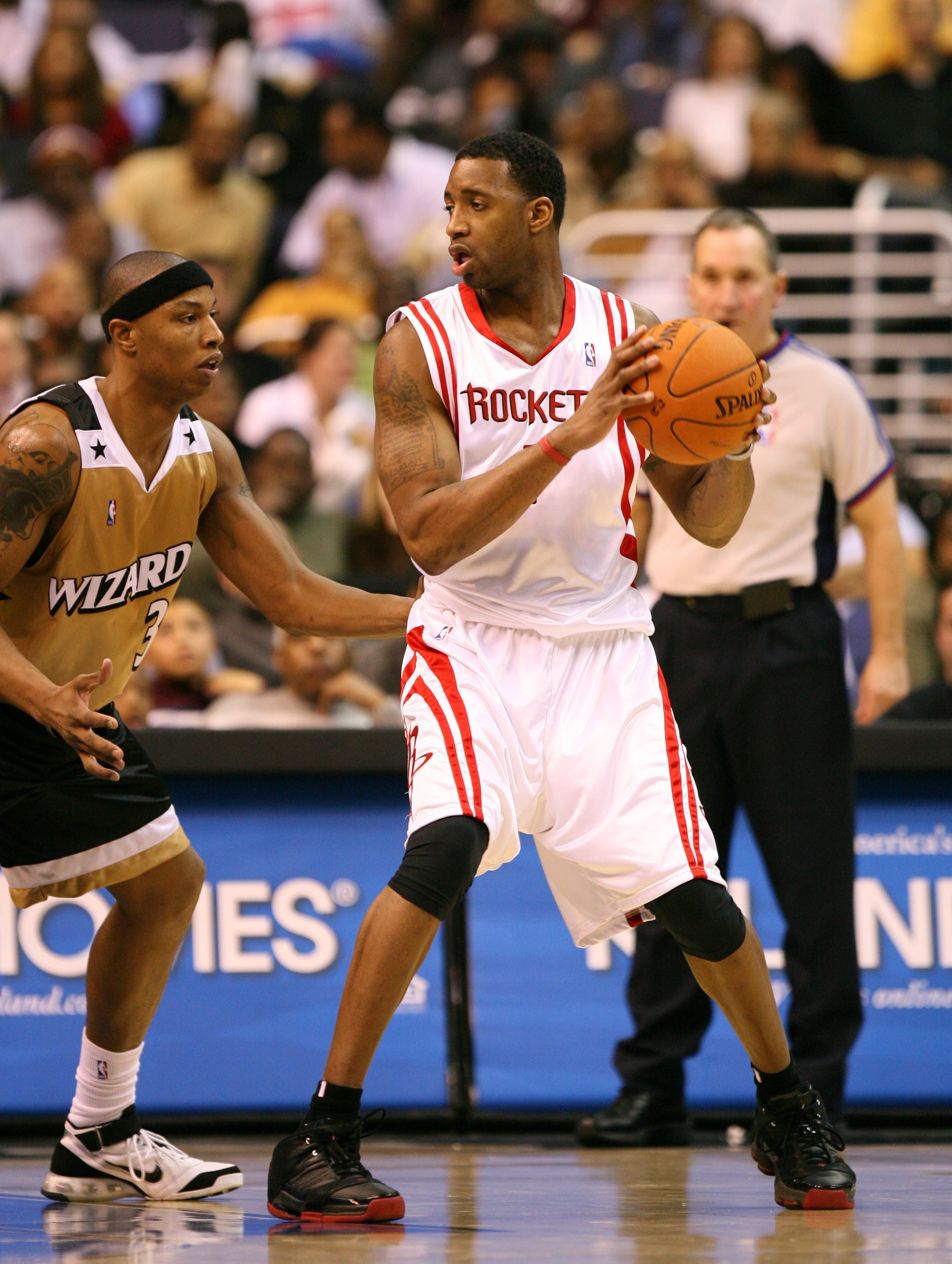
McGrady isolates against Caron Butler in 2006

On June 29, 2004, McGrady, Juwan Howard, Tyronn Lue, and Reece Gaines were traded to the Houston Rockets as part of a seven-player deal that sent Steve Francis, Cuttino Mobley, and Kelvin Cato to the Magic. In response to the trade, McGrady stated that he was happy with the situation and expressed excitement over the prospect of playing alongside Rocket All-Star center Yao Ming. Shortly after arriving in Houston, McGrady signed a three-year, $63 million contract extension with the team.

The Rockets struggled to begin the 2004–05 season, posting a losing record of 16–17 through their first 33 games. On December 9, McGrady had one of the most memorable performances of his career, scoring 13 points in the final 35 seconds against the San Antonio Spurs including a last-second three-pointer to secure a comeback victory. The sequence included four consecutive three-pointers, one of which was part of a four-point play and the last of which was a game-winner in the final two seconds. After the All-Star break, Houston rebounded from their slow start, finishing the season with 51 wins and the fifth-best record in the West. McGrady's final averages were 25.7 points, 6.2 rebounds, and 5.7 assists per game. In Game 2 of the first round of the postseason, he had another signature performance, completing a "thunderous" dunk over 7'6" Dallas Mavericks center Shawn Bradley and hitting a game-winner for a 113–111 victory. The series would go to a decisive Game 7, where McGrady came out cold, missing his first seven shots en route to a 40-point loss.

==== 2005–06 season: Injury and missing playoffs ====
The 2005–06 season was a disappointing one for the Rockets, as McGrady appeared in only 47 games due to injury. At various points during the year, he missed time due to back spasms, including a moment in January where he had to be carried off the court in a stretcher due to a severe flare up. Despite his health concerns, McGrady was able to play in that year's All-Star Game in front of his home crowd in Houston, exploding for 36 points in just 27 minutes. For the season, he averaged 24.4 points and 6.5 rebounds per game. Due in part to his frequent absences, the Rockets failed to qualify for the playoffs.

==== 2006–07 season: Playoff upset ====
Early in the 2006–07 season, McGrady missed seven games, again because of back spasms, eventually deciding to visit a doctor and receive treatment for the injury as he felt that it was affecting his speed and explosiveness. His health issues and the ascension of Yao Ming, who was having a breakout season, resulted in McGrady temporarily becoming the team's second scoring option. His final averages were 24.6 points, 5.3 rebounds, and 6.5 assists per game. To open the playoffs, the Rockets were matched up the Utah Jazz. By this time, pressure had started to mount on McGrady to lead the team deep into the postseason, to which he responded, "If we don't get out of the first round, it's on me!" Houston would eventually lose the series in seven games, and at his postgame press conference following the Game 7 defeat, McGrady, still visibly emotional from the loss, said "I tried, man, I tried."

==== 2007–08 season: 22-game winning streak ====
In 2007–08, the Rockets went on a 22-game winning streak, which was the then-second longest in NBA history, despite missing Yao Ming during that stretch. During their run, McGrady expressed optimism over the team's roster, admitting, "I haven't had this kind of trust in my teammates before." Houston finished the season as the West's fifth seed, earning them a rematch with the Jazz in the first round. By the time the playoffs arrived, McGrady was nursing shoulder and knee injuries, at times requiring him to receive pain-killing injections and have fluid drained from both his shoulder and knee in order for him to be able to play. The Jazz again eliminated the Rockets, this time in six games, despite a strong 40-point and 10-rebound performance from McGrady in the decisive Game 6.

==== 2008–09 season: Season-ending surgery ====
Following Houston's loss to Utah, McGrady underwent arthroscopic surgery on both his left shoulder and left knee. Early in the 2008–09 season, he missed 18 games, including a two-week stretch in January as his knee was not fully healed from his offseason surgery. On February 24, he had microfracture surgery in Chicago, forcing him to miss the remainder of the year. By then, his averages had declined to 15.6 points and 4.4 rebounds per game. In a surprise turn of events, the Rockets qualified for the playoffs without McGrady and advanced to the second round, pushing the eventual-champion Los Angeles Lakers to seven games.

==== 2009–10 season: Final season in Houston ====
McGrady was still recovering from surgery to begin the 2009–10 campaign. On December 15, he returned to action but was limited to only seven minutes off the bench. After six games, the Rockets decided to shut him down again so that they could focus on trading him to another team.

=== New York Knicks (2010) ===
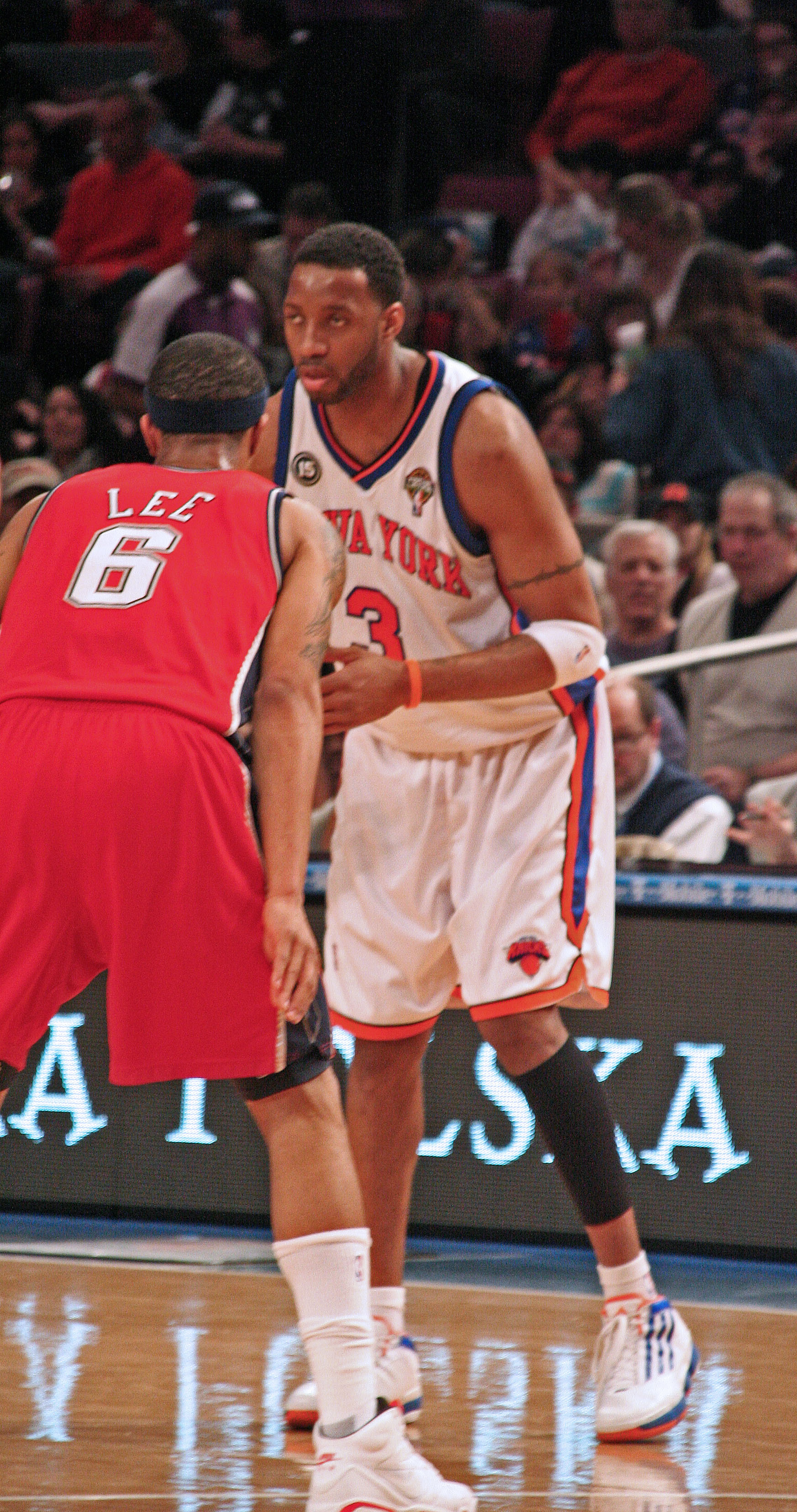
McGrady with the Knicks in 2010

On February 18, 2010, McGrady was traded to the New York Knicks as part of a three-team trade involving Houston, New York, and Sacramento. Two days later, he made his team debut, scoring 26 points in an overtime loss against the Thunder. He would finish the season with averages of 9.4 points, 3.9 rebounds, and 3.7 assists in 26.1 minutes per game. McGrady only appeared in 24 games for the Knicks.

=== Detroit Pistons (2010–2011) ===
A free agent for the first time in ten years, McGrady met with and worked out for the Los Angeles Clippers and Chicago Bulls. Bulls second-year guard Derrick Rose publicly supported the idea of McGrady coming to Chicago. McGrady would end up signing a one-year contract with the Detroit Pistons.

On January 14, 2011, McGrady scored a season high 22 points and recorded 5 assists in a 101–95 victory over the Raptors. Two weeks later, on January 28, McGrady scored 14 points, recorded 10 assists, grabbed 8 rebounds, and blocked 4 shots in an 88–87 loss to the Heat. He averaged 8 points per game for the 2010–11 season.

=== Atlanta Hawks (2011–2012) ===
Following the 2011 NBA lockout, McGrady signed a one-year deal with the Atlanta Hawks. In the lockout-shortened 66 game season, McGrady played 52 games, and for the first time in his career did not start any of them.

On January 2, 2012, McGrady had a memorable performance against the then-undefeated "Big Three" Miami Heat (who went on to win the NBA Finals that year) with a 13-point fourth quarter to bring Atlanta back to win the game. Battling injuries through the year, he averaged a career-low 5.3 points per game.

=== Qingdao Eagles (2012–2013) ===
On October 9, 2012, McGrady signed a one-year deal with the Qingdao DoubleStar Eagles of the Chinese Basketball Association. Qingdao finished the season in last place, with McGrady averaging 25 points, 7.2 rebounds, 5.1 assists, and 1.6 steals per game.

=== San Antonio Spurs (2013) ===
On April 16, 2013, shortly after the conclusion of the CBA campaign, McGrady signed with the San Antonio Spurs in time for him to qualify for their playoff roster. The Spurs eventually advanced to the 2013 NBA Finals, losing in seven games to the Miami Heat, which provided McGrady with the opportunity to play his first career postseason minutes outside of the first round.

On August 26, McGrady announced his retirement from the NBA on ESPN's First Take.

== National team career ==
McGrady was selected to the United States national team for the FIBA Americas Championship 2003 in San Juan, Puerto Rico. On August 22, McGrady led the Americans with 16 points in a 98–69 victory over Venezuela. McGrady sat out the August 26 game due to a back injury. The U.S. qualified for the 2004 Olympic Games on August 30 with an 87–71 win over Puerto Rico; in the game, McGrady and Puerto Rico's Eddie Casiano were involved in an altercation which resulted in fans throwing drinks and debris on the court. Ultimately, the U.S. advanced to the gold medal game, defeating Argentina to finish a perfect 10–0. For the tournament, McGrady averaged 12.6 points and 2.9 rebounds a game on 54.4 percent from the field and 42.1 percent three-point shooting.

== Professional baseball career ==
On February 4, 2014, McGrady confirmed that he was officially pursuing his dream of becoming a professional baseball player, working with Roger Clemens to become a pitcher for the Sugar Land Skeeters of the Atlantic League of Professional Baseball. On April 23, McGrady made the Skeeters' Opening Day roster. In his debut, he pitched 1 2/3 innings, receiving the loss. In July, he started the Atlantic League All-Star Game, where he recorded his first strikeout. After the game, McGrady announced his retirement from baseball.

== Player profile ==
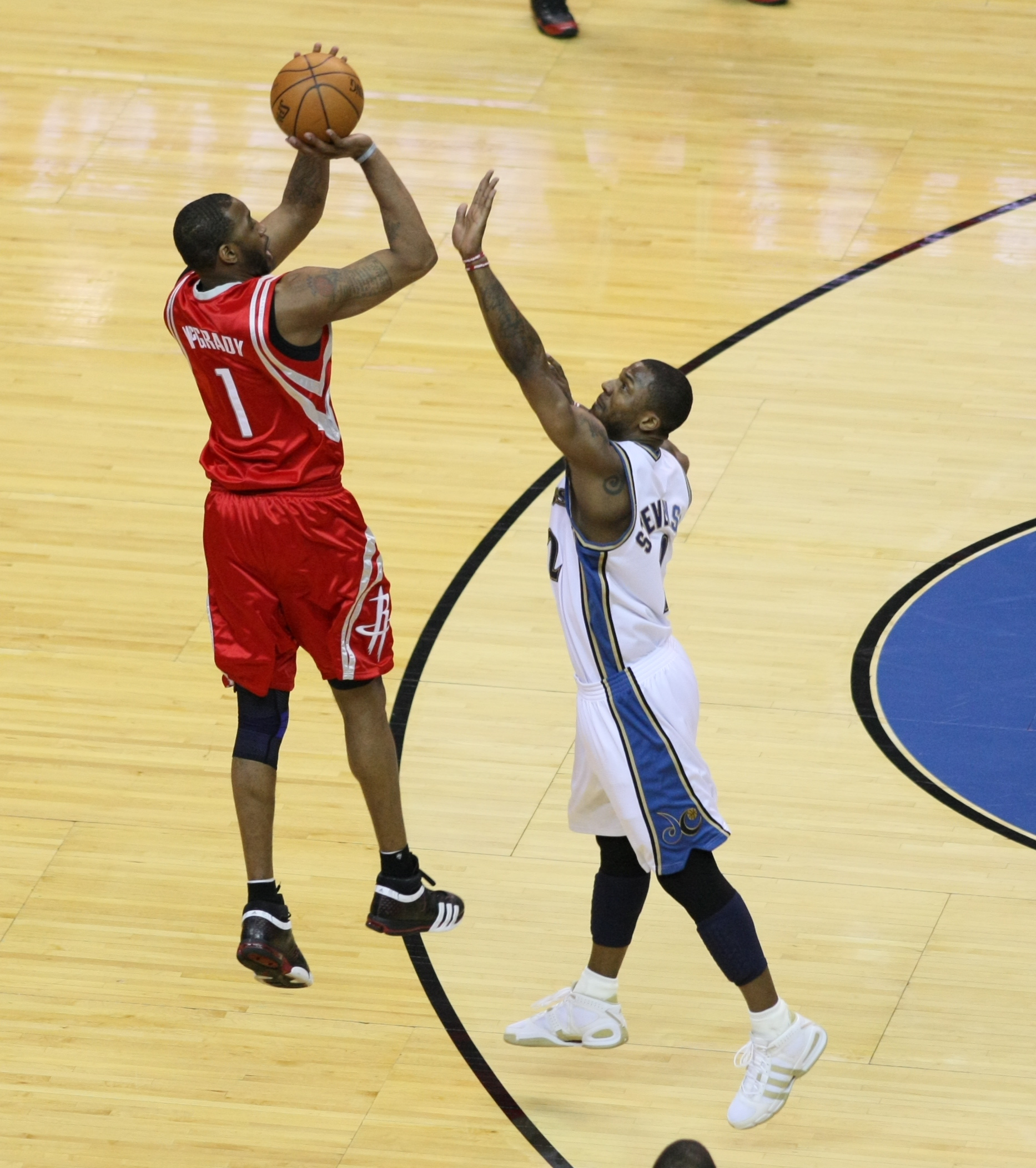
McGrady shoots over DeShawn Stevenson in 2008

Standing 6 feet 8 inches (2.03 m) and weighing 210 pounds (95 kg), McGrady played as a shooting guard and small forward. His career averages were 19.6 points, 5.6 rebounds, and 4.4 assists per game. McGrady earned seven All-NBA honors (2001–05, 2007–08), seven All-Star selections (2001–07), two NBA scoring titles (2003–04), and won the NBA Most Improved Player Award in 2001. He was inducted into the Naismith Memorial Basketball Hall of Fame as part of the Class of 2017.

McGrady was known for his laid-back demeanor and scoring prowess; he once scored 41 points in a game despite being asleep right until tip-off, a performance that inspired the nickname "The Big Sleep". Many of his contemporaries, including Paul Pierce and Kobe Bryant, have called him one of the most difficult players that they ever had to guard. McGrady's playing style has been compared to George Gervin's because both players made scoring appear easy with their "smooth" approach to the game. At his peak, McGrady was an explosive player capable of finishing at the rim over the defense; in a piece for ESPN, Zach Lowe reminisced, "He glided through the lane, crouched into traffic, and accelerated suddenly -- almost violently -- through a forest of slower-moving forms, and to the rim." McGrady was also a threat from outside, and would frequently pull up for deep three-pointers over unsuspecting defenders. Some analysts have remarked that McGrady's length, playmaking, and shooting abilities would have made him more effective in the modern era of basketball, and that he was ahead of his time. On the defensive side of the ball, McGrady's effort was less consistent, but he demonstrated the ability to raise his level in meaningful games, such as during the playoffs against the Mavericks, where he often drew the assignment of guarding Dirk Nowitzki.

During his time as an All-Star, McGrady was frequently criticized for not having led any team beyond the first round of the playoffs. Some analysts have defended McGrady, feeling that he was the victim of bad rosters and unfortunate circumstances. His effort level, leadership, and toughness were also questioned at times. In response to these criticisms, former Rockets coach Jeff Van Gundy described McGrady as a poor practice player but praised his coachability, unselfishness, and ability to perform well in big games.

McGrady is often ranked as one of the greatest basketball players of all-time; The Book of Basketball ranked him 77th, ESPN ranked him 63rd, and SLAM Magazine ranked him 97th. In 2016, Sports Illustrated listed McGrady as one of the 20 best basketball players since the announcement of the original 50 Greatest Players in NBA History in 1996. In 2021, to commemorate the NBA's 75th Anniversary The Athletic ranked their top 75 players of all time, and named McGrady as the 55th greatest player in NBA history. Nikola Jokić named McGrady as one of his favorite players to watch growing up as a child.

== Personal life ==
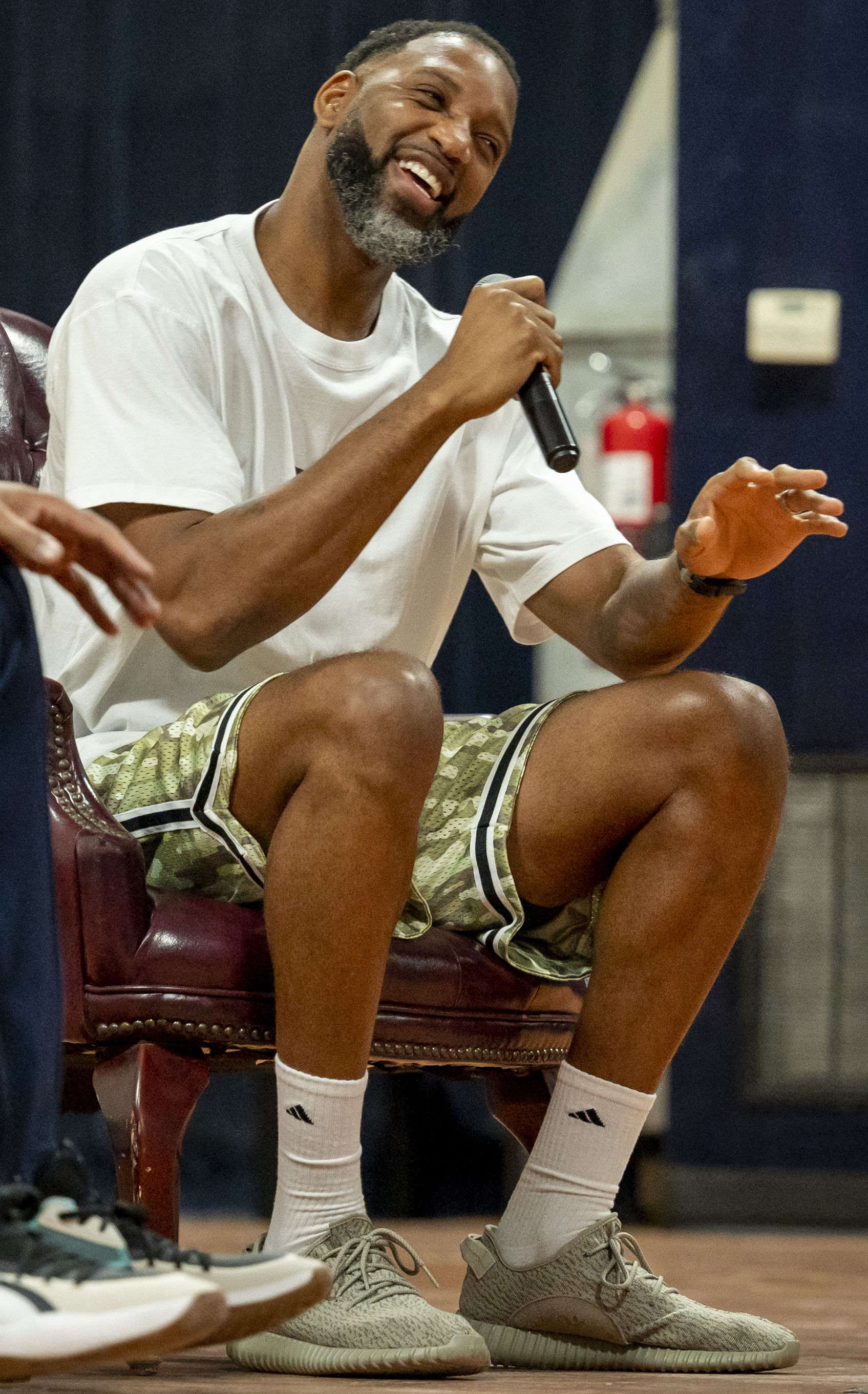
McGrady at Al Udeid Air Base in 2021

McGrady has three children with his wife, CleRenda Harris. Their first son, Laymen Lamar, was born on December 27, 2005, during a home game in Houston, which McGrady left at halftime. Tracy's younger brother, Chancellor "Chance" McGrady, played for the 2008 NCAA Division I men's basketball tournament runner-up Memphis Tigers.

McGrady is also the second cousin once removed of basketball player Vince Carter through Carter's step-great-grandfather; the two therefore are not related by blood. They were teammates with the Raptors in 1998–2000. Both players were unaware of the relation until a family reunion in 1997. After McGrady left the Raptors, they had a feud, but it was resolved in a short period of time.

In 2002, McGrady signed a longterm partnership with Adidas, agreeing to an endorsement deal that lasted through his playing career and beyond. Adidas produced a signature line of shoes for McGrady that Complex remembered as "all the buzz in the early-mid 2000s". Upon retiring, McGrady shifted his focus to his business investments, including Dasdak, a Washington, D.C.–based technology company, and Blue-04, a bottled water company in Florida. He was also an initial investor in a Minor League Baseball team which would become the Biloxi Shuckers.

Beginning in 2016, McGrady worked as an NBA analyst for ESPN. On July 29, 2025, McGrady joined NBC as a studio analyst.

In 2007, McGrady traveled to the Darfurian refugee camps in Chad with John Prendergast and Omer Ismail of the Enough Project. McGrady recruited NBA players to support an initiative linking schools in Darfurian refugee camps to American middle schools, high schools, and universities. Prior to the start of the 2010 season with the Rockets, he changed his jersey number to No. 3 in order to promote his humanitarian efforts in the region and a documentary on his summer visit called 3 Points. In 2008, McGrady was criticized for his comments on the All-Star Game being held in New Orleans, which was only three years removed from the destruction surrounding Hurricane Katrina. McGrady publicly questioned the quality of public safety and protection of NBA players.

In August 2021, McGrady launched an app, SOLEcial, designed to sell autographed shoes, trading cards, and other memorabilia directly to buyers.

In December 2024, McGrady, his former Raptors teammate Vince Carter, Jozy Altidore and a coalition of private equity fund executives purchased a minority stake in the National Football League's Buffalo Bills.

In October 2025, McGrady joined huupe as the company's Chief Innovation Officer. Huupe, the developers of the world's first smart basketball hoop and gaming console, announced McGrady's appointment alongside Vince Carter, who joined the company as a strategic advisor.

McGrady made an appearance in the film Marty Supreme playing a member of the Harlem Globetrotters alongside fellow former NBA player Kemba Walker.

On May 13, 2026, McGrady joined Wagner College as a strategic advisor for the program.

== Career statistics ==
NBA statistics per Basketball-Reference. CBA statistics per CBA Data Center.

Legend
GP	Games played	GS	Games started	MPG	Minutes per game
FG%	Field goal percentage	3P%	3-point field goal percentage	FT%	Free throw percentage
RPG	Rebounds per game	APG	Assists per game	SPG	Steals per game
BPG	Blocks per game	PPG	Points per game	**Bold**	Career high
*	Led the league

=== NBA regular season ===
Year	Team	GP	GS	MPG	FG%	3P%	FT%	RPG	APG	SPG	BPG	PPG
1997–98	Toronto	64	17	18.4	.450	.341	.712	4.2	1.5	.8	1.0	7.0
1998–99	Toronto	49	2	22.6	.436	.229	.726	5.7	2.3	1.1	1.3	9.3
1999–00	Toronto	**79**	34	31.2	.451	.277	.707	6.3	3.3	1.1	**1.9**	15.4
2000–01	Orlando	77	77	40.1	**.457**	.355	.733	7.5	4.6	1.5	1.5	26.8
2001–02	Orlando	76	76	38.3	.451	.364	.748	**7.9**	5.3	1.6	1.0	25.6
2002–03	Orlando	75	74	39.4	**.457**	.386	.793	6.5	5.5	**1.7**	.8	**32.1***
2003–04	Orlando	67	67	39.9	.417	.339	.796	6.0	5.5	1.4	.6	28.0*
2004–05	Houston	78	**78**	**40.8**	.431	.326	.774	6.2	5.7	**1.7**	.7	25.7
2005–06	Houston	47	47	37.1	.406	.312	.747	6.5	4.8	1.3	.9	24.4
2006–07	Houston	71	71	35.8	.431	.331	.707	5.3	**6.5**	1.3	.5	24.6
2007–08	Houston	66	62	37.0	.419	.292	.684	5.1	5.9	1.0	.5	21.6
2008–09	Houston	35	35	33.7	.388	.376	**.801**	4.4	5.0	1.2	.4	15.6
2009–10	Houston	6	0	7.7	.368	**.500**	.667	.8	1.0	.0	.3	3.2
2009–10	New York	24	24	26.1	.389	.242	.754	3.7	3.9	.6	.5	9.4
2010–11	Detroit	72	39	23.4	.442	.341	.698	3.5	3.5	.9	.5	8.0
2011–12	Atlanta	52	0	16.1	.437	.455	.675	3.0	2.1	.3	.3	5.3
Career		938	703	32.7	.435	.338	.746	5.6	4.4	1.2	.9	19.6
All-Star		7	6	24.6	.500	.351	.619	3.0	3.9	1.6	.4	17.1

=== NBA playoffs ===
Year	Team	GP	GS	MPG	FG%	3P%	FT%	RPG	APG	SPG	BPG	PPG
2000	Toronto	3	3	37.0	.386	.286	**.875**	7.0	3.0	1.0	1.0	16.7
2001	Orlando	4	4	**44.5**	.415	.200	.816	6.5	**8.3**	1.8	1.3	**33.8**
2002	Orlando	4	4	**44.5**	**.462**	.313	.739	6.3	5.5	.5	**1.8**	30.8
2003	Orlando	**7**	**7**	44.0	.448	.340	.773	6.7	4.7	**2.0**	.9	31.7
2005	Houston	**7**	**7**	43.0	.456	**.370**	.824	7.4	6.7	1.6	1.4	30.7
2007	Houston	**7**	**7**	40.0	.394	.250	.737	5.9	7.3	.7	.9	25.3
2008	Houston	6	6	41.2	.425	.208	.623	**8.2**	6.8	1.5	.8	27.0
2012	Atlanta	6	0	15.0	.385	.000	.833	2.8	1.0	.0	.3	4.2
2013	San Antonio	6	0	5.2	.000	.000	—	1.3	1.2	.3	.5	.0
Career		50	38	34.5	.426	.290	.757	5.7	5.0	1.1	.9	22.2

=== CBA regular season ===
Year	Team	GP	GS	MPG	FG%	3P%	FT%	RPG	APG	SPG	BPG	PPG
2012–13	Qingdao	29	26	31.8	.496	.333	.733	7.2	5.1	1.6	.6	25.0

== Awards and honors ==
Per McGrady's Basketball-Reference page unless noted otherwise.

- Naismith Memorial Basketball Hall of Fame: inducted on September 8, 2017
- 2× NBA scoring champion: 2003, 2004
- NBA free throw scoring leaders: (2003)
- 7× NBA All-Star: 2001, 2002, 2003, 2004, 2005, 2006, 2007
- 7× All-NBA:

- First Team: 2002, 2003
- Second Team: 2001, 2004, 2007
- Third Team: 2005, 2008

- NBA Most Improved Player Award: 2001
- Tournament of the Americas Gold Medalist: 2003
- CBA All-Star: 2013
- No. 1 retired by Qingdao DoubleStar Eagles: 2015
- Mr. Basketball USA: 1997
- McDonald's All-American: 1997

=== Orlando Magic franchise records ===
- Most points in a game with 62 (March 10, 2004 vs. Washington Wizards)
- Most field goal attempts in a season with 1813 (2002–03)
- Most free throws made in a season with 576 (2002–03)
- Most points in a season with 2407 (2002–03)
- Highest minutes per game in a season with 40.1 (2002–03)
- Highest points per game in a season with 32.1 (2002–03)
- Highest minutes per game in a career with 39.4
- Highest points per game in a career with 28.1

== See also ==
- List of individual National Basketball Association scoring leaders by season
- List of National Basketball Association players with 60 or more points in a game
