= Cedar Grove High School (Georgia) =

Public high school in Ellenwood, Georgia, United States

Location
- 2360 River Road; Ellenwood, Georgia 30294; United States; 33°40′35″N 84°17′39″W

Information
- Type: Public high school
- Motto: "Keep The Main Thing The Main Thing”
- Established: 1972
- Locale: Suburban, Large
- School district: DeKalb County School District
- NCES District ID: 1301740
- NCES School ID: 130174000639
- Principal: Dr. Reginald Griffin
- Teaching staff: 78.00 (on an FTE basis)
- Grades: 9-12
- Enrollment: 1,121 (2024–25)
- Student to teacher ratio: 14.37
- Color: Blue on blue
- Nickname: Saints
- Website: cedargrovehs.dekalb.k12.ga.us

Cedar Grove High School (CGHS) is located at 2360 River Road, Ellenwood, Georgia, United States in suburban unincorporated south Dekalb County. It opened in the fall of 1972 with an enrollment of 512 students.

Enrollment has fluctuated over the years with the development of the surrounding area. In 1993, with the resurgence of housing developments in the area, enrollment began to increase.

Cedar Grove High has six computer labs - one writing composition lab, one math/science lab, three business labs, and a NAF AOIT Academy lab. A teacher computer in each classroom is networked with internet access.

Since the inception of the Bill Gates Millennium Scholars Program, Cedar Grove High has had winners: two in the first year, two in the second year, and one in the third.

== Notable alumni ==
- Xavier Avery, professional baseball player
- B. J. Cohen, former arena football player
- Dion Glover, professional basketball player
- Antwuan Jackson, professional football player
- Reggie Johnson, basketball player
- Kayin Lee, college football cornerback for the Tennessee Volunteers
- DeAngelo Malone, NFL football player
- Marcus McNeill, NFL football player
- Christen Miller, college football defensive tackle
- Natina Reed, rapper and member of Blaque
- Justin Shaffer, NFL football player
- Alfonso Smith, Jr., former professional soccer player
- Desi Banks, Comedian
- Diamond, Rapper
