= Al Smith (soccer) =

American soccer player

Personal information
- Full name: Alfonso Smith Jr.
- Date of birth: October 6, 1962 (age 64)
- Place of birth: Atlanta, Georgia, United States
- Position: Defender

Senior career*
Years	Team	Apps	(Gls)
1985–1988	Wichita Wings (indoor)	61	(10)

International career
- US U-20
- * Club domestic league appearances and goals

Alfonso Smith Jr. is a retired American soccer defender.

Smith grew up in Ellenwood, Georgia where he was a Parade All American soccer player at Cedar Grove High School. He played one game for the United States U-20 men's national soccer team at the 1981 FIFA World Youth Championship. In July 1984, Smith was named to U.S. soccer team at the 1984 Summer Olympics. However, he and several other collegiate players were replaced by professionals before the tournament. On June 19, 1985, the Wichita Wings selected Smith in the first round (fourth overall) of the Major Indoor Soccer League draft.
