= Ellenwood, Georgia =

- Unincorporated Community
- Location within Georgia
- Coordinates: 33°36′36″N 84°17′17″W
- Country: United States
- State: Georgia
- Counties: Clayton, DeKalb, Henry, Rockdale
- Elevation: 853 ft (260 m)

Population
  - Total: 46,967
- Time zone: UTC-5 (Eastern (EST))
  - Summer (DST): UTC-4 (EDT)
- ZIP code: 30294
- Area codes: 770 / 678 / 470
- GNIS feature ID: 331649

Ellenwood is an unincorporated community in Clayton, Henry, Rockdale, and DeKalb counties in the U.S. state of Georgia. The community is a southeast suburb of Atlanta and is located along Interstate 675 and Georgia State Route 42. With a population of 46,967 and ten constituent neighborhoods, Ellenwood is the 19th largest community in Georgia.

Ellenwood has a post office with ZIP code 30294.

== History ==
Ellenwood was first inhabited in 1830 by freed slaves from Henry County. It was incorporated in 1966 and its name is derived from the Ellenwood Plantation, which was settled in the 19th century and was owned by Colonel John H. Ellenwood. The plantation was one of the largest in the area, but was destroyed during the civil war by union troops, being rebuilt by the family later on.

== Government and infrastructure ==
The Atlanta Federal Records Center of the National Archives is in Ellenwood.

The Clayton County Police Department operates the Precinct 1 office in Ellenwood. It also operates the James Townsend Animal Control and Adoption Center in Ellenwood. Its namesake was the supervisor of animal control, James L. Townsend, who had died. The center received its current name in 2025.

=== Transit systems ===
MARTA serves the suburb.

== Education ==
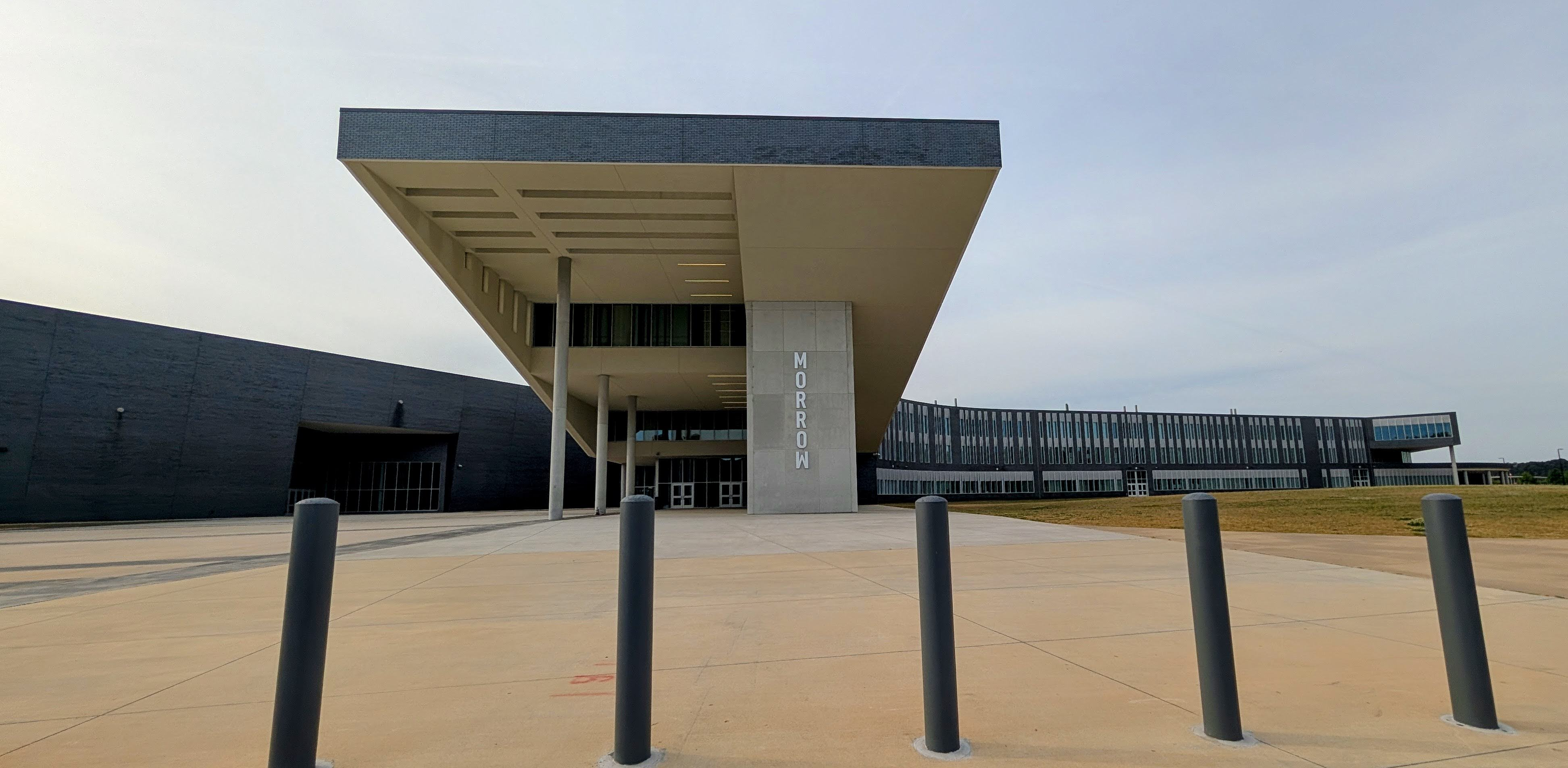
Morrow High School, which covers sections of Ellenwood in Clayton County

All areas in Clayton County are in the Clayton County School District.

Schools with Ellenwood post office addresses include:

- East Clayton Elementary School
- Morrow High School - The facility in Ellenwood, the current campus, opened in 2022.

Adamson Middle School, which has a Rex address, covers areas in Ellenwood in Clayton County. The district operates Steele Road Stadium in Ellenwood.

DeKalb County Public Schools covers DeKalb County areas not in the cities of Decatur nor Atlanta. Schools in that district with Ellenwood addresses:

- Cedar Grove Elementary School
- Cedar Grove High School

Cedar Grove Middle School, also in an unincorporated area, uses a "Decatur" postal address.

A portion of the Ellenwood area is in Henry County. All areas in Henry County are in the Henry County Schools school district.

== Parks and recreation ==
Sonna Singleton Gregory Senior Center, operated by the Clayton County government, is in Ellenwood. It was previously the Northeast Senior Center, but was renamed in 2021.

== Notable people ==
- Brandon Greene (born 1994), NFL player
- Justin Shaffer (born 1998), NFL player
- Bo Walker, college football player
