= 2024 Ohio Bobcats football team =

American college football season

2024 Ohio Bobcats football

MAC champion Cure Bowl champion

MAC Championship, W 38–3 vs. Miami (OH)

Cure Bowl, W 30–27 vs. Jacksonville State
- Conference: Mid-American Conference
- Record: 11–3 (7–1 MAC)
- Head coach: Tim Albin (4th season; regular season); Brian Smith (interim; bowl game)
- Offensive coordinator: Brian Smith (1st season)
- Offensive scheme: Spread option
- Defensive coordinator: John Hauser (1st season)
- Co-defensive coordinator: Nate Faanes (1st season)
- Base defense: 4–2–5
- Captains: Parker Navarro; Coleman Owen; Parker Titsworth; Bradley Weaver; Adonis Williams Jr.; Jeremiah Wood
- Home stadium: Peden Stadium

2024 Mid-American Conference football standings
| | Conf. | | | Overall |
| Team | W | | L | W | | L |
|---|---|---|---|---|---|---|
| Ohio y$ | 7 | – | 1 | 11 | – | 3 |
| Miami (OH) y | 7 | – | 1 | 9 | – | 5 |
| Buffalo | 6 | – | 2 | 9 | – | 4 |
| Bowling Green | 6 | – | 2 | 7 | – | 6 |
| Western Michigan | 5 | – | 3 | 6 | – | 7 |
| Toledo | 4 | – | 4 | 8 | – | 5 |
| Northern Illinois | 4 | – | 4 | 8 | – | 5 |
| Akron | 3 | – | 5 | 4 | – | 8 |
| Eastern Michigan | 2 | – | 6 | 5 | – | 7 |
| Central Michigan | 2 | – | 6 | 4 | – | 8 |
| Ball State | 2 | – | 6 | 3 | – | 9 |
| Kent State | 0 | – | 8 | 0 | – | 12 |
Championship: Ohio 38, Miami (OH) 3
$ – Conference champion; y – Championship game participant

The 2024 Ohio Bobcats football team represented Ohio University as a member of the Mid-American Conference (MAC) during the 2024 NCAA Division I FBS football season. The Bobcats were led by Tim Albin in his fourth year as the head coach. Albin led them to their first MAC Championship since 1968. Albin accepted the head position at Charlotte after the Championship Game. The Bobcats were led in the Cure Bowl by Brian Smith. The Bobcats played their home games at Peden Stadium, located in Athens, Ohio.

Ohio entered the season coming off their second straight 10 win season and ended the 2023 season with a win over Georgia Southern the Myrtle Beach Bowl for their fifth straight bowl win. It was the first time in school history that the Bobcats won 10 games in back to back years. Ohio suffered numerous losses in the transfer portal in the offseason including 12 players who transferred to programs in power conferences. Among the losses was starting quarterback and 2022 MAC Player of the Year Kurtis Rourke who transferred to Indiana. Ohio entered the season ranked 133 out of 134 FBS teams in returning production as determined by the SP+ rankings. With incoming transfers and freshman recruits the Bobcats featured 53 scholarship players who are new to the roster from the prior season. Among the returners are quarterback Parker Navarro and running back Ricky Hunt who both made their first start in last season's bowl game while filling the roles left open by players transferring out and were two key players in the victory. Navarro had 11 competitions on 16 attempts for 120 yards and 71 rushing yards. Hunt's 5 TD's tied the record in bowl games and set an Ohio program record.

In the season opener at Syracuse, the Bobcat running game got going behind Anthony Tyus III's 203 yards but they couldn't stop the Syracuse passing game as Kyle McCord threw for 354 yards and four touchdowns in a 38–22 loss in the JMA Wireless Dome. Ohio opened their home schedule with evening game a win over South Alabama. Parker Navarro had 204 yards passing and 63 yards rushing and passed and rushed for a touchdown in a 27–20 victory. Navarro threw three interceptions and the Bobcat offense turned it over four times but their defense held Morgan State to 211 yards in a 21–6 win the following week. The Bobcats finished the non-conference schedule with two wins and two losses after a loss at Kentucky. Backup quarterback Nick Poulos started for Ohio and the offense struggled as the Wildcat front seven dominated in a 41–6 loss.

Ohio opened MAC conference play with a 30–10 homecoming win over Akron. Parker Navarro came back from injury and threw for two touchdowns and ran for another in the win. They moved to 2–0 in conference play as Navarro again scored on the ground and though the air to help the Bobcats to a 24–0 halftime lead in a win over Central Michigan in a game in which they had to hold on late to win 27–25. Miami's defense held Ohio scoreless in the first half and to only 291 yards for the game as the Bobcats lost the 100th Battle of the Bricks in Oxford by a score of 30–20. The Bobcats returned home the following week against Buffalo. Coleman Owen scored three touchdowns, Shay Taylor had a pick-six and Kadin Schmitz had a pick-two as Ohio cruised to a 47–16 win. Ohio got its second easy win in a row when the travelled to play a banged up Kent State team on a 17-game losing streak in their first mid-week "MACtion" game. Eamonn Dennis returned a kick, Coleman Owen returned a punt, and the defense shutout the Golden Flashes on only 114 total yards in a dominant 41–0 win to move back into a tie for first in the conference. Ohio, in control of its own destiny for a MAC Championship, hosted Eastern Michigan on a Wednesday night. Parker Navarro threw for 277 yards while rushing for 106 yards and 4 touchdowns while Tank Pearson had two interceptions in a 35–10 win. The following Wednesday, they won at Toledo for only the second time since 1967. Ohio's offense kept the ball for over 41 minutes and their defense forced three turnovers in a 24–7 win. The Bobcats had improved their conference record to 6–1 and controlled their own destiny in the regular season finale against Ball State. Navarro threw for three touchdowns, two of which were to Owen, and ran for two more. Ohio was able to sit its starters for most of the second half in a 42–21 win that sealed an appearance in the 2024 MAC Championship Game.

Prior to the 2022 season the university installed new turf in Peden Stadium. The new field at Peden is called "Frank Solich Field" after the MAC's all-time coaching wins leader to whom Albin was a long time assistant. With the win over Ball State, Ohio finished unbeaten at home for the second time in three seasons and improved to 17–1 on the new surface.

In the Championship Game on December 7, at Ford Field in Detroit, Michigan, Ohio avenged the regular season loss to Miami, winning 38–3. They won the MAC Championship for the first time since 1968. Parker Navarro won Offensive Player of the Game with 235 passing yards with 2 touchdowns and 73 rushing yards and 2 touchdowns. Bradley Weaver was Defensive Player of the Game. Gianni Spetic hit a 53-yard field goal and won Special Teams Player of the Game. After the game, Albin exited the team bus in northern Ohio on the way back to campus to take the head coaching position at Charlotte without notifying the team.

Ohio accepted a bid to play Jacksonville State in the Cure Bowl. The Gamecocks were the champions of Conference USA and were coming off of a 52–12 win over Western Kentucky in the Championship Game. Brian Smith was named the interim head coach for the bowl game and was named full time head coach on December 18. Ohio's trio of offensive stars shined in the Bowl game. Navarro passed for 227 yards and a touchdown and ran for 119 yards and three touchdowns and joined Anthony Tyus as the team's second thousand-yard rusher. Tyus ran for 123 yards. Coleman Owen had 111 yards receiving and broke LaVon Brazill's school record for receiving yards in as season. The 30–27 win that gave Smith his first victory as a head coach as Ohio won 11 games in a season for the first time in school history. It was the program's sixth straight bowl win.

== Offseason ==
=== Coaching staff changes ===
==== Departures ====
| Name | Position | New school | New position |
|---|---|---|---|
| Spence Nowinsky | Associate head coach/Defensive coordinator/defensive ends | Memphis | Co-defensive coordinator & defensive line |
| Dwayne Dixon | Wide receivers | | Retired |

==== Additions ====
| Name | Position | Previous school | Previous position |
|---|---|---|---|
| Kurt Mattix | Defensive ends/Pass Rush Specialist | San Diego State | Defensive coordinator/linebackers |
| Andre Allen | Wide receivers | UC Davis | Wide receivers |

==== Internal changes ====
| Name | New position | Previous position |
|---|---|---|
| Brian Smith | Associate Head Coach/Offensive Coordinator/running backs | Running backs/passing game coordinator |
| John Hauser | Defensive Coordinator/Safeties | Safeties |
| Nate Faanes | co-defensive coordinator/Special teams coordinator/linebackers | Special teams coordinator/linebackers |
| Scott Isphording | Passing game coordinator/quarterbacks | Offensive coordinator/quarterbacks |
| Allen Rudolph | Offensive line | Co-offensive coordinator/offensive line |
| Brian Metz | Recruiting Coordinator/Tight ends | Tight ends |
| DeAngelo Smith | Def. Passing Game Coordinator/Cornerbacks/director of player development | Cornerbacks/director of player development |

=== Transfers ===
Positions key
| Offense | Defense | Special teams |
|---|---|---|
| QB — Quarterback; RB — Running back; FB — Fullback; WR — Wide receiver; TE — Tight end; OL — Offensive lineman; T — Tackle; G — Guard; C — Center | DL — Defensive lineman; DT — Defensive tackle (Note: Includes nose tackle (NT)); DE — Defensive end; EDGE — Edge rusher; LB — Linebacker (Note: Includes middle linebacker (MLB/MIKE), weakside linebacker (WILL), strongside linebacker (SAM), off-ball linebacker, and outside linebacker (OLB)); DB — Defensive back; CB — Cornerback; S — Safety (Note: Includes free safety (FS) and strong safety (SS)) | K — Kicker (Note: Also known as a placekicker (PK)); P — Punter; LS — Long snapper; RS — Return specialist (Note: Includes kickoff and punt returners) |

==== Outgoing ====
| Player | Position | Destination |
|---|---|---|
| Keegan Wilburn | WR | Bryant |
| Will Kacmarek | TE | Ohio State |
| Ben Johnson | LB | |
| Quintell Quinn | RB | Texas Southern |
| Kurt Danneker | OL | Baylor |
| Tyler Foster | TE | Oklahoma State |
| Tristan Cox | DL | |
| Kurtis Rourke | QB | Indiana |
| Aramoni Rhone | WR | Arkansas–Pine Bluff |
| O'Shaan Allison | RB | Austin Peay |
| Sieh Bangura | RB | Minnesota |
| Miles Cross | WR | Indiana |
| Keye Thompson | LB | Pittsburgh |
| Bryce Kitrell | RB | |
| Alec Burton | TE | Utah Tech |
| Tyler Walton | WR | Eastern Michigan |
| Justin Holloway | LS | Arizona |
| Rayyan Buell | DL | Colorado |
| Jacoby Jones | WR | UCF |
| John Motton | CB | Robert Morris |
| CJ Harris | QB | California |
| Torrie Cox | CB | Illinois |
| Caden Campolieti | LB | Valdosta State |
| Shedrick Rhodes | T | Rutgers |
| Jailen Hammer | WR | |
| Cam McCullum | CB | |

==== Incoming ====
| Player | Position | Transferred From |
|---|---|---|
| Max Rodarte | WR | City College of San Francisco |
| Anthony Tyus III | RB | Northwestern |
| Tigana Cisse | OT | Idaho |
| Jacob Proche | CB | Coastal Carolina |
| CJ Doggette | DL | Cincinnati |
| Ben McNoboe | DE | North Dakota State |
| Blake Leake | LB | Bucknell |
| Dustin Johnson | S | Northern Colorado |
| Trent Allen | OL | Davenport |
| Jake Bruno | TE | Saint Francis |
| Colby Garfield | LS | East Carolina |
| Jacob Lewis | K | Minnesota |
| Beau Blankenship | TE | Marshall |
| Coleman Owen | WR | Northern Arizona |
| Tigana Cisse | T | Idaho |
| Eian Pugh | WR | Illinois |
| Cam Rice | DL | West Liberty |
| Eamonn Dennis | WR | Michigan |
| Marcell Walker-Burgess | DL | Nevada |
| Michael Mack | CB | Wisconsin |
| Reise Collier | LB | UAB |
| Carson Heidecker | OL | Notre Dame College |
| Zach Reiners | OL | Centre College |
| Nicholas Poulos | QB | El Camino College |
| Sinn Brennan | DE | San Diego State |
| LJ Shumpert | DB | Northwest Mississippi Community College |
| Nathan Hale | DL | Iowa Western Community College |
| Jaylen Johnson | DB | Memphis |
| Benjamin Maldonado | OL | Dodge City Community College |
| Delaney Crawford | WR | Virginia |
| Blake Guffey | TE | Notre Dame College |
| Jakob Lemus | OL | Ventura College |

=== Recruiting class ===
College recruiting
| Name | Hometown | School | Height | Weight | Commit date |
|---|---|---|---|---|---|
| Kesean Anderson; OG | Daleville, Virginia | Lord Botetourt | 6 ft 4 in (1.93 m) | 325 lb (147 kg) | |
| Kesean Anderson; OG | Recruit ratings: 247Sports: ESPN: (77) | | | | |
| Dominic Dorwart; WR | Leonardtown, Maryland | St. Mary's Ryken | 6 ft 1 in (1.85 m) | 190 lb (86 kg) | |
| Dominic Dorwart; WR | Recruit ratings: 247Sports: ESPN: (76) | | | | |
| Tony Mathis Jr. S | Macon, Georgia | Westside | 6 ft 0 in (1.83 m) | 175 lb (79 kg) | |
| Tony Mathis Jr. S | Recruit ratings: 247Sports: ESPN: (75) | | | | |
| Kaden Hurst; WR | Leo, Indiana | Leo | 5 ft 11 in (1.80 m) | 180 lb (82 kg) | |
| Kaden Hurst; WR | Recruit ratings: 247Sports: ESPN: (74) | | | | |
| Hunter Thompson; WR | Linganore-Bartonsville, Maryland | Oakdale | 6 ft 2 in (1.88 m) | 195 lb (88 kg) | |
| Hunter Thompson; WR | Recruit ratings: ESPN: (74) | | | | |
| Jasen Kelly; ILB | Toledo, Ohio | Whitmore | 6 ft 0 in (1.83 m) | 210 lb (95 kg) | |
| Jasen Kelly; ILB | Recruit ratings: 247Sports: ESPN: (74) | | | | |
| Bryce Parson; OG | Saint Louis, Missouri | Christian Brothers | 6 ft 2 in (1.88 m) | 280 lb (130 kg) | |
| Bryce Parson; OG | Recruit ratings: 247Sports: ESPN: (74) | | | | |
| J.T. Haskins; S | Lexington, Kentucky | Bryan Station | 6 ft 2 in (1.88 m) | 280 lb (130 kg) | |
| J.T. Haskins; S | Recruit ratings: 247Sports: ESPN: (74) | | | | |
| Nick Segarra; TE | Charlotte, North Carolina | Charlotte Catholic | 6 ft 5 in (1.96 m) | 225 lb (102 kg) | |
| Nick Segarra; TE | Recruit ratings: 247Sports: ESPN: (73) | | | | |
| Andrew Erby Jr. DT | Steelton, Pennsylvania | Steelton-Highspire | 6 ft 2 in (1.88 m) | 290 lb (130 kg) | |
| Andrew Erby Jr. DT | Recruit ratings: 247Sports: ESPN: (73) | | | | |
| Stellan Bowman; OLB | Kentwood, Michigan | East Kentwood | 6 ft 0 in (1.83 m) | 205 lb (93 kg) | |
| Stellan Bowman; OLB | Recruit ratings: 247Sports: ESPN: (72) | | | | |
| A.J. Miller; TE | Pickerington, Ohio | Pickerington North | 6 ft 3 in (1.91 m) | 205 lb (93 kg) | |
| A.J. Miller; TE | Recruit ratings: 247Sports: | | | | |
| Samuel Ehret; DE | Clearwater, Florida | Clearwater Academy | 6 ft 3 in (1.91 m) | 245 lb (111 kg) | |
| Samuel Ehret; DE | Recruit ratings: 247Sports: | | | | |
| Parker Startz; OT | Chicago, Illinois | Mount Carmel | 6 ft 2 in (1.88 m) | 225 lb (102 kg) | |
| Parker Startz; OT | Recruit ratings: 247Sports: | | | | |
| Seth Anstead; OG | Chelsea, Michigan | Chelsea | 6 ft 3 in (1.91 m) | 275 lb (125 kg) | |
| Seth Anstead; OG | Recruit ratings: 247Sports: | | | | |
| Duncan Brune; RB | Germany | | 5 ft 11 in (1.80 m) | 200 lb (91 kg) | |
| Duncan Brune; RB | Recruit ratings: No ratings found | | | | |
| Miles Cremascoli; TE | Winnetka, Illinois | New Trier | 6 ft 4 in (1.93 m) | 210 lb (95 kg) | |
| Miles Cremascoli; TE | Recruit ratings: No ratings found | | | | |
| D.J. Morton; S | Indianapolis, Indiana | Lawrence Central | 6 ft 0 in (1.83 m) | 175 lb (79 kg) | |
| D.J. Morton; S | Recruit ratings: 247Sports: | | | | |
| Brock Arndt; OLB | Appleton, Wisconsin | Appleton North | 6 ft 3 in (1.91 m) | 230 lb (100 kg) | |
| Brock Arndt; OLB | Recruit ratings: 247Sports: | | | | |
| Matthew Papas; QB | Grove City, Ohio | Grove City | 6 ft 3 in (1.91 m) | 230 lb (100 kg) | |
| Matthew Papas; QB | Recruit ratings: No ratings found | | | | |
Overall recruit ranking:
‡ Refers to 40-yard dash; Note: In many cases, Scout, Rivals, 247Sports, On3, and ESPN may conflict in their listings of height, weight and 40 time.; In these cases, the average was taken. ESPN grades are on a 100-point scale.; Sources: "Rivals commits". Rivals.; "ESPN commits". ESPN.; "2024 Team Ranking". Rivals.com.; "247Sports commits". 247Sports.

== Preseason ==
The MAC Football Kickoff was held on Friday, July 19, 2024 at the Pro Football Hall of Fame in Canton, Ohio from 9:00 am EDT to 1:30 pm EDT. Ohio was represented by Head Coach Tim Albin, quarterback Parker Navarro, and safety Jeremiah Wood.

=== Preseason poll ===
On July 19 the MAC announced the preseason coaches poll. Ohio was picked to finish fifth in the conference. The Bobcats received zero votes to win the MAC Championship.

== Schedule ==
| Date | Time | Opponent | Site | TV | Result | Attendance | Source |
|---|---|---|---|---|---|---|---|
| August 31 | 3:30 p.m. | at Syracuse* | JMA Wireless Dome; Syracuse, NY | ACCN | L 22–38 | 37,225 | |
| September 7 | 6:00 p.m. | South Alabama* | Peden Stadium; Athens, OH | ESPN+ | W 27–20 | 22,158 | |
| September 14 | 3:30 p.m. | Morgan State* | Peden Stadium; Athens, OH | ESPN+ | W 21–6 | 20,438 | |
| September 21 | 12:45 p.m. | at Kentucky* | Kroger Field; Lexington, KY | SECN | L 6–41 | 61,783 | |
| September 28 | 3:30 p.m. | Akron^{†} | Peden Stadium; Athens, OH | ESPN+ | W 30–10 | 21,265 | |
| October 12 | 4:00 p.m. | at Central Michigan | Kelly/Shorts Stadium; Mount Pleasant, MI | ESPNU | W 27–25 | 22,437 | |
| October 19 | 3:30 p.m. | at Miami (OH) | Yager Stadium; Oxford, OH (Battle of the Bricks) | ESPN+ | L 20–30 | 17,021 | |
| October 26 | 12:00 p.m. | Buffalo | Peden Stadium; Athens, OH | CBSSN | W 47–16 | 16,048 | |
| November 6 | 7:00 p.m. | at Kent State | Dix Stadium; Kent, OH | ESPNU | W 41–0 | 5,662 | |
| November 13 | 7:00 p.m. | Eastern Michigan | Peden Stadium; Athens, OH | ESPN2 | W 35–10 | 14,133 | |
| November 20 | 7:00 p.m. | at Toledo | Glass Bowl; Toledo, OH | ESPN2 | W 24–7 | 14,543 | |
| November 29 | 12:00 p.m. | Ball State | Peden Stadium; Athens, OH | CBSSN | W 42–21 | 11,804 | |
| December 7 | 12:00 p.m. | vs. Miami (OH) | Ford Field; Detroit, MI (MAC Championship Game / Battle of the Bricks) | ESPN | W 38–3 | 15,478 | |
| December 20 | 12:00 p.m. | vs. Jacksonville State* | Camping World Stadium; Orlando, FL (Cure Bowl) | ESPN | W 30–27 | 10,518 | |
*Non-conference game; ^{†}Homecoming; All times are in Eastern time; Source:

== Game summaries ==
=== At Syracuse ===
Ohio Bobcats (0–0) at Syracuse Orange (0–0) – Game summary

| Quarter | 1 | 2 | 3 | 4 | Total |
|---|---|---|---|---|---|
| Bobcats | 6 | 3 | 7 | 6 | 22 |
| Orange | 0 | 17 | 14 | 7 | 38 |

at JMA Wireless Dome • Syracuse, NY

- Date: August 31
- Game time: 3:30 p.m. EDT
- Game weather: Indoor
- Game attendance: 37,225
- Referee: Jeff Heaser (ACC)
- TV announcers (ACCN): Chris Cotter (play-by-play), Mark Herzlich (analyst), Coley Harvey (sideline)
- Ohio notes, boxscore

Game information

First quarter

- (08:33) OHIO - Gianni Spetic 43-yard FG, 13 plays, 50 yards, TOP 06:27; (OHIO 3–0)
- (00:11) OHIO - Gianni Spetic 37-yard FG, 12 plays, 54 yards, TOP 07:24; (OHIO 6–0)

Second quarter

- (12:28) SYR - Oronde Gadsden II 28-yard pass from Kyle McCord (Brady Denaburg kick), 8 plays, 75 yards, TOP 02:43; (SYR 7–6)
- (02:02) SYR - Brady Denaburg 26-yard FG, 17 plays, 73 yards, TOP 07:01; (SYR 10–6)
- (00:49) OHIO - Gianni Spetic 20-yard FG, 7 plays, 72 yards, TOP 01:13; (SYR 10–9)
- (00:05) SYR - Trebor Pena 20-yard pass from Kyle McCord (Brady Denaburg kick), 8 plays, 75 yards, TOP 00:44; (SYR 17–9)

Third quarter

- (11:44) OHIO – Anthony Tyus III 13-yard run (Gianni Spetic kick), 5 plays, 75 yards, TOP 02:22; (SYR 17–16)
- (06:37) SYR - LeQuint Allen 5-yard pass from Kyle McCord (Brady Denaburg kick), 9 plays, 75 yards, TOP 05:07; (SYR 24–16)
- (03:34) SYR - Trebor Pena 14-yard pass from Kyle McCord (Brady Denaburg kick), 5 plays, 67 yards, TOP 01:57; (SYR 31–16)

Fourth quarter

- (13:30) SYR - Trebor Pena 1-yard run (Brady Denaburg kick), 8 plays, 68 yards, TOP 03:16; (SYR 38–16)
- (12:22) OHIO – Anthony Tyus III 46-yard run (run failed), 4 plays, 75 yards, TOP 01:08; (SYR 38–22)

| Statistics | OHIO | SYR |
|---|---|---|
| First downs | 26 | 25 |
| Total yards | 69–436 | 70–480 |
| Rushing yards | 39–255 | 30–126 |
| Passing yards | 181 | 354 |
| Passing: Comp–Att–Int | 18–30–1 | 27–40–1 |
| Time of possession | 31:28 | 28:32 |

| Team | Category | Player | Statistics |
|---|---|---|---|
| Ohio | Passing | Parker Navarro | 18/30, 181 yards, 1 INT |
| Ohio | Rushing | Anthony Tyus III | 16 rushes, 203 yards, 2 TD |
| Ohio | Receiving | Coleman Owen | 10 receptions, 137 yards |
| Syracuse | Passing | Kyle McCord | 27/39, 354 yards, 4 TD, 1 INT |
| Syracuse | Rushing | LeQuint Allen | 15 rushes, 98 yards |
| Syracuse | Receiving | Oronde Gadsden II | 7 receptions, 108 yards, 1 TD |

Ohio opened the season at Syracuse. The Orange were coming off a 6–7 season after which they fired head coach Dino Babers. They start the season with a new head coach, Fran Brown, and a significant amount of roster tunrover. Syracuse started former Ohio State quarterback and transfer Kyle McCord. This was the fourth all-time meeting. Ohio entered the game 0–3 against the Orange.

Ohio took the opening kickoff and went on a 50-yard drive but had to settle for a Gianni Spetic field goal. McCord got off to a slow start with two of is first three passes nearly intercepted by Ohio. After a Syracuse punt the Bobcats marched down the field again but had to settle for another field goal. Syracuse took the lead on their next possession on a 28-yard reception by Oronde Gadsden II from Kyle McCord. After an Ohio punt, Syracuse went on a seven-minute drive that used most of the rest if the half but they also had to settle for a short field goal. Ohio received the kickoff with 2:02 left in the half and reached the Syracuse 3 yard line with 1:07 left. They again had to settle for a field goal. Syracuse used their timeouts to receive the kick with 0:49 left. McCord completed 6 of 8 passes on the ensuing drive and hit Trebor Pena to a touchdown with 5 seconds left in the half to give Syracuse a 17–9 lead.

Syracuse went three and out to start the half. Ohio received the punt and marched 75 yards in five plays on a drive that culminated in a 13-yard touchdown run by Anthony Tyus III to the Bobcats within 1. The Ohio rushing attack was working well but they only punched it in the end zone once. In the third quarter McCord got hot and led the Orange on three consecutive touchdown drives which ended on receptions by LeQuint Allen and Trebor Pena respectively and the third on a 1-yard Pena rush. A 46-yard touchdown run by Tyus early in the fourth ended the scoring.

Tyus's 203 yards on the ground was the bright spot for Ohio. 137 of Narvaro's 181 passing yards were caught by transfer Coleman Owen. Austin Brawley led Ohio with 12 tackles. McCord threw for 357 yards of which 108 were to Gadsden and 78 to Pena. LeQuint Allen had 98 rushing yards for the Orange.

=== vs. South Alabama ===
South Alabama Jaguars (0–1) at Ohio Bobcats (0–1) – Game summary

| Quarter | 1 | 2 | 3 | 4 | Total |
|---|---|---|---|---|---|
| Jaguars | 0 | 10 | 7 | 3 | 20 |
| Bobcats | 3 | 14 | 7 | 3 | 27 |

at Peden Stadium • Athens, OH

- Date: September 7
- Game time: 6:00 p.m. EDT
- Game weather: Sunny • Temperature: 81 °F (27 °C)
- Game attendance: 22,158
- Referee: Jeremy Parker (Sunbelt)
- TV announcers (ESPN+): Jim Barbar (play-by-play), Marcus Ray (analyst)
- Ohio notes, boxscore

Game information

First quarter

- (03:03) OHIO – Gianni Spetic 45-yard field goal, 5 plays, 54 yards, 1:35; OHIO 3–0

Second quarter

- (10:43) OHIO – Anthony Tyus III 7-yard run (Gianni Spetic kick), 3 plays, 20 yards, 1:24; OHIO 10–0
- (04:29) USA – Laith Marjan 28-yard field goal, 6 plays, 54 yards, 2:25; OHIO 10–3
- (01:25) USA – Fluff Bothwell 8-yard run (Laith Marjan kick), 5 plays, 60 yards, 1:53; Tied 10–10
- (00:36) OHIO – Chase Hendricks 33-yard pass from Parker Navarro (Gianni Spetic kick), 7 plays, 75 yards, 0:49; OHIO 17–10

Third quarter

- (08:39) OHIO – Parker Navarro 10-yard run (Gianni Spetic kick), 11 plays, 76 yards, 6:14; OHIO 24–10
- (01:52) USA – Jamaal Pritchett 9-yard pass from Bishop Davenport (Laith Marjan kick), 13 plays, 75 yards, 6:47; OHIO 24–17

Fourth quarter

- (14:15) USA – Laith Marjan 38-yard field goal, 6 plays, 21 yards, 2:21; OHIO 24–20
- (03:16) OHIO – Gianni Spetic 26-yard field goal, 14 plays, 78 yards, 7:53; OHIO 27–20

| Statistics | USA | OHIO |
|---|---|---|
| First downs | 18 | 20 |
| Total yards | 64–335 | 68–404 |
| Rushing yards | 27–109 | 40–200 |
| Passing yards | 226 | 204 |
| Passing: Comp–Att–Int | 23–37–0 | 20–28–0 |
| Time of possession | 27:43 | 32:17 |

| Team | Category | Player | Statistics |
|---|---|---|---|
| South Alabama | Passing | Bishop Davenport | 23/37, 226 yards, TD |
| South Alabama | Rushing | Fluff Bothwell | 10 carries, 70 yards, TD |
| South Alabama | Receiving | Devin Voisin | 5 receptions, 77 yards |
| Ohio | Passing | Parker Navarro | 20/28, 204 yards, TD |
| Ohio | Rushing | Anthony Tyus III | 17 carries, 74 yards, TD |
| Ohio | Receiving | Chase Hendricks | 4 receptions, 65 yards, TD |

Ohio opened their home schedule with South Alabama. The Jaguars was coming off a 7–6 season after which head coach Kane Wommack departed to join new Alabama head coach Kalen DeBoer's staff as defensive coordinator. They started the season with a new head coach, former Texas quarterback and Houston head coach, Major Applewhite South Alabama dropped their week 1 opening game to North Texas by a score of 52–38 in a game where both teams had 550 yards or more of total offense. Their quarterback, Gio Lopez, threw for 432 yards in the loss but did not play against Ohio due to a toe injury. Bishop Davenport started in his place. This was the first ever meeting between the two schools.

Both teams' defenses ruled the game early as the first three drives of the game ended in punts. Ohio took the ball on their own 19 on their second drive and on the first play from scrimmage Ricky Hunt Jr. got the Bobcats into field goal range with a 59-yard rush. However, they couldn't get any closer and had to settle to a field goal by Gianni Spetic.

After another exchange of punts, South Alabama's punt returner fumbled Jack Wilson's punt and Ohio fell on it to set their offense up at the USA 20 yard line. It only took three plays to find paydirt as Anthony Tyus scored from 7 yards out. After another exchange of punts, the Jaguars took the ball with 6:35 left in the half and went on a 6 play 54-yard drive to set up a Laith Marjan field goal. The Bobcats went 3 and out and gave the ball right back. The Jaguars tied the game with an easy 5 play drive culminating in a Fluff Bothwell 8-yard touchdown run with only 1:25 left in the half. It was more time than the Bobcats needed as Ohio quarterback Parker Navarro connected on 6 of 7 passes and found Chase Hendricks in the endzone from 33 yards out before the half expired.

Ohio took the second half kickoff and went down the field on an 11 play drive that ended on a score on a quarterback draw by Navarro to give the Bobcats a 14-point lead. South Alabama answered with a 13 play drive of their own as Bishop Davenport completed a pass to Jamaal Pritchett in the endzone to get back within a touchdown. On the first play of the ensuing drive Navarro was sacked and fumbled and gave the ball right back to South Alabama. The Jaguars could not fully capitalize and settled for a field goal early in the fourth quarter.

Ohio went 3 and out on their next drive but South Alabama could not do any better and responded with a 3 and out of their own. Ohio received the punt on their own 14 and after 13 plays they reached the USA 11 with 4:02 left and elected for a 26-yard field goal to get up by 7. South Alabama penalties pushed them backwards on the ensuing drive and they faced a 4th and 17 from their own 12. With 3 timeouts they elected to punt it away. Ohio kept it on the ground and salted away the program's 600th victory after two first downs.

Navarro was 20-of-28 for 204 yards and with 63 yards on the ground. The Bobcat's held the USA offense that put up 550 yards on North Texas to 335 yards and the Ohio offense rushed for 200 yards.

=== vs. Morgan State (FCS) ===
Game Three – Morgan State Bears (FCS) (1–1) at Ohio Bobcats (1–1) – Game summary

| Quarter | 1 | 2 | 3 | 4 | Total |
|---|---|---|---|---|---|
| Bears (FCS) | 3 | 3 | 0 | 0 | 6 |
| Bobcats | 14 | 0 | 7 | 0 | 21 |

at Peden Stadium • Athens, OH

- Date: September 14
- Game time: 3:30 p.m. EDT
- Game weather: Temperature:87 °F (31 °C) • Wind: 9 mph • Weather: Sunny
- Game attendance: 20,438
- Referee: William Williams (MAC)
- TV announcers (ESPN+): Michael Reghi (play-by-play) and Marcus Ray (analyst)
- Ohio Notes, boxscore

Game information

First quarter

- (06:37) OHIO – Anthony Tyus III 19-yard pass from Parker Navarro (Gianni Spetic kick), 7 plays, 82 yards, 3:37; OHIO 7–0
- (03:03) MORG – Beckett Leary 30-yard field goal, 10 plays, 62 yards, 4:36; OHIO 7–3
- (00:00) OHIO – Parker Navarro 10-yard run (Gianni Spetic kick), 4 plays, 81 yards, 1:53; OHIO 14–3

Second quarter

- (03:03) MORG – Beckett Leary 33-yard field goal, 6 plays, 18 yards, 1:54; OHIO 14–6

Third quarter

- (10:20) OHIO – Anthony Tyus III 13-yard run (Gianni Spetic kick), 9 plays, 74 yards, 4:34; OHIO 21–6

Fourth quarter

- No scoring plays

| Statistics | MORG | OHIO |
|---|---|---|
| First downs | 16 | 22 |
| Total yards | 63–211 | 57–335 |
| Rushing yards | 33–75 | 38–148 |
| Passing yards | 136 | 187 |
| Passing: Comp–Att–Int | 15–30–1 | 14–19–4 |
| Time of possession | 29:34 | 30:26 |

| Team | Category | Player | Statistics |
|---|---|---|---|
| Morgan State | Passing | Tahj Smith | 15/30, 136 yards, INT |
| Morgan State | Rushing | Jason Collins Jr. | 9 carries, 35 yards |
| Morgan State | Receiving | Andre Crawley | 6 receptions, 65 yards |
| Ohio | Passing | Parker Navarro | 12/15, 162 yards, TD, 3 INT |
| Ohio | Rushing | Anthony Tyus III | 16 carries, 90 yards, TD |
| Ohio | Receiving | Coleman Owen | 6 receptions, 112 yards |

Morgan State came to Athens with a 1–1 record as they had split two games with fellow FCS foes with a win over Hampton and a loss to Towson. This was the first meeting ever between the two schools.

After forcing a Bear's punt on the opening drive, the Bobcats took the ball and marched down the field in 7 plays for a touchdown to open the scoring. Parker Navarro found Anthony Tyus III from 19 yards out. The Bears countered with a long drive of their own but had to settle for a Beckett Leary 30-yard field goal. Ohio responded with another touchdown on a 10-yard quarterback draw from Navarro on the last play of the first quarter, which was set up by a 53-yard reception by Coleman Owen.

The Bobcats recovered an onside kick but Navarro immediately threw his first of three second quarter interceptions to Bryan Stukes attempting a pass over the deep middle. The defenses ruled the second quarter as teams exchanges five consecutive three and out drives. Jadon Carter then setup Morgan State deep in Ohio territory with the second pick of Navarro. They had to settle for a short field goal to get within 8. Navarro threw is third interception on the third play of the next drive to set up the Bears at the Ohio 28 but Morgan State quarterback Tahj Smith was intercepted by Marcel Walker just before the end of the half.

Ohio backup quarterback Nick Poulos relieved Navarro in the second half and led the Bobcats on a touchdown drive to open the half. Tyus found paydirt again from 13 yards out. This would give the 'Cats a 21–6 lead and would be the last score of the game. Morgan State reached the Ohio 5 on their next drive but a chip shot field goal was blocked. They reached the Ohio 2 on their next drive but were stopped on fourth down early in the fourth quarter. They were again stopped on downs after a Poulos fumble late the fourth. Morgan State had the ball in Ohio territory in seven different drives and reached the red zone four times but only managed to score six points.

Ohio held the Bears to 211 yards of offense but their own offense turned it over four times. Tyus again led the offense with 90 yards on the ground and scored two touchdowns. Owen had 112 receiving yards. Blake Leake led the defense with 12 tackles. Smith has 136 yards through the air for Morgan State.

=== At Kentucky ===
Ohio Bobcats (2–1) at Kentucky Wildcats (1–2) – Game summary

| Quarter | 1 | 2 | 3 | 4 | Total |
|---|---|---|---|---|---|
| Bobcats | 0 | 0 | 0 | 6 | 6 |
| Wildcats | 3 | 14 | 10 | 14 | 41 |

at Kroger Field • Lexington, KY

- Date: September 21
- Game time: 12:45 p.m. EDT
- Game weather: Cloudy • Temperature: 84 °F (29 °C) • Wind: SW 8ph
- Game attendance: 61,783
- Referee: Daniel Gautreaux (SEC)
- TV announcers (SECN): Dave Neal (play-by-play), Aaron Murray (analyst), and Ashley ShahAhmadi (sideline)
- Ohio Notes, boxscore

Game information

First quarter

- (05:48) UK – Alex Raynor 30-yard field goal, 8 plays, 52 yards, 4:47; UK 3–0

Second quarter

- (14:39) UK – Demie Sumo-Karngbaye 1-yard run (Alex Raynor kick), 7 plays, 80 yards, 3:28; UK 10–0
- (04:07) UK – Demie Sumo-Karngbaye 2-yard run (Alex Raynor kick), 7 plays, 80 yards, 3:41; UK 17–0

Third quarter

- (05:18) UK – Alex Raynor 34-yard field goal, 13 plays, 67 yards, 6:07; UK 20–0
- (05:12) UK – Maxwell Hairston 25-yard Interception Return (Alex Raynor kick), UK 17–0

Fourth quarter

- (14:53) OHIO – Rickey Hunt Jr. 1-yard run (pass failed), 5 plays, 51 yards, 2:00; UK 27–7
- (11:38) UK – Barion Brown 23-yard run (Alex Raynor kick), 6 plays, 56 yards, 3:07; UK 34–7
- (03:45) UK – Gavin Wimsatt 2-yard run (Alex Raynor kick), 12 plays, 59 yards, 6:17; UK 41–7

| Statistics | OHIO | UK |
|---|---|---|
| First downs | 14 | 25 |
| Total yards | 51–223 | 68–488 |
| Rushing yards | 32–113 | 41–206 |
| Passing yards | 110 | 282 |
| Passing: Comp–Att–Int | 8–19–1 | 19–27–0 |
| Time of possession | 26:25 | 33:35 |

| Team | Category | Player | Statistics |
|---|---|---|---|
| Ohio | Passing | Nick Poulos | 8/19, 110 yards, INT |
| Ohio | Rushing | Duncan Brune | 6 carries, 33 yards |
| Ohio | Receiving | Coleman Owen | 4 receptions, 54 yards |
| Kentucky | Passing | Brock Vandagriff | 17/24, 237 yards |
| Kentucky | Rushing | Jamarion Wilcox | 8 carries, 82 yards |
| Kentucky | Receiving | Dane Key | 7 receptions, 145 yards |

Ohio traveled to Lexington, Kentucky to play the Wildcats. This was already the Wildcats fourth home game of the season. They had an opening win over Southern Miss followed by a loss to South Carolina. The prior week they lost to Georgia, who was ranked No. 1 at the time, by only a single point. This was the 7th all-time meeting. Kentucky entered with a 4–2 series lead The last meeting was a 20–3 Kentucky win in 2014.

With staring quarterback Parker Navarro out with an undisclosed injury Ohio tuned to backup Nick Poulos and struggled to move the ball against an SEC defense. After the teams exchanged punts on their first possessions, Kentucky struck first late in the first quarter with a 30-yard field goal Kentucky found paydirt on their next possession to go up by ten and then went on an 80-yard drive to go up by 17. The Bobcats reached the UK 5 yard line late in the half but squandered the chance as Poulos fumbled.

Kentucky took complete control in the game in the third quarter. A short Ohio punt to start the half led to another UK field goal On the first play of the ensuing drive Poulos was intercepted by Maxwell Hairston who returned it for a touchdown After an Ohio three and out Kentucky set up Ohio with a short field after failing on fourth down. Ricky Hunt punched it into the endzone to get Ohio on the board. Kentucky stretched the lead with touchdowns on each of their next two possessions.

Brock Vandagriff was 17-of-24 with 237 passing yards for Kentucky. Dane Key was on the receiving end of 109 yards of that total. Jamarion Wilcox had 82 of Kentucky's 206 rushing yards. Kentucky outgained Ohio 488 to 223. Poulos was held to 110 yards passing in his first start for the Bobcats.

=== vs. Akron ===
Akron Zips (1–3) at Ohio Bobcats (2–2) – Game summary

| Quarter | 1 | 2 | 3 | 4 | Total |
|---|---|---|---|---|---|
| Zips | 3 | 7 | 0 | 0 | 10 |
| Bobcats | 0 | 14 | 2 | 14 | 30 |

at Peden Stadium • Athens, OH

- Date: September 28
- Game time: 3:30 p.m. EDT
- Game weather: Sunny • Temperature: 75 °F (24 °C)
- Game attendance: 21,265
- Referee: Andrew Speciale (MAC)
- TV announcers (ESPN+): Michael Reghi (play-by-play) and Marcus Ray (analyst)
- Ohio Notes, boxscore

Game information

First quarter

- (06:42) AKR – Garrison Smith 30-yard field goal, 11 plays, 49 yards, 5:38; AKR 3–0

Second quarter

- (06:32) OHIO – Mason Williams 0-yard run (Gianni Spetic kick), 4 plays, 42 yards, 2:02; OHIO 7–3
- (01:20) OHIO – Jake Newell 18-yard pass from Ben Finley (Garrison Smith kick), 3 plays, 31 yards, 0:40; AKR 10–7
- (00:17) OHIO – Coleman Owen 17-yard pass from Parker Navarro (Gianni Spetic kick), 7 plays, 75 yards, 1:03; OHIO 14–10

Third quarter

- (05:24) OHIO – Marcel Walker-Burgess 0-yard Safety, OHIO 16–10

Fourth quarter

- (11:51) OHIO – Coleman Owen 75-yard pass from Parker Navarro (Gianni Spetic kick), 2 plays, 73 yards, 0:42; OHIO 23–10
- (0:59) OHIO – Parker Navarro 0-yard run (Gianni Spetic kick), 10 plays, 85 yards, 5:30; OHIO 30–10

| Statistics | AKR | OHIO |
|---|---|---|
| First downs | 14 | 21 |
| Total yards | 58–178 | 69–440 |
| Rushing yards | 20–-18 | 51–236 |
| Passing yards | 196 | 204 |
| Passing: Comp–Att–Int | 25–38–2 | 12–18–0 |
| Time of possession | 25:33 | 34:27 |

| Team | Category | Player | Statistics |
|---|---|---|---|
| Akron | Passing | Ben Finley | 25/38, 196 yards, 1 TD, 2 INT |
| Akron | Rushing | Charles Kellorn | 4 carries, 12 yards |
| Akron | Receiving | Adrian Norton | 5 receptions, 59 yards |
| Ohio | Passing | Parker Navarro | 12/18, 204 yards, 2 TD |
| Ohio | Rushing | Parker Navarro | 13 carries, 113 yards, 1 TD |
| Ohio | Receiving | Coleman Owen | 6 receptions, 130 yards, 2 TD |

Ohio opened MAC conference play as they hosted Akron for their homecoming. The Zips came to Athens with a 1–3 record with a win over FCS Colgate and losses at power conference opponents Ohio State, Rutgers, and South Carolina. It took a while for the Bobcat offense to get going but their defense controlled the game and Ohio defended its home turn for homecoming with a 30–10 win over Akron. Quarterback Parker Navarro came back from injury and threw two touchdown passes to Coleman Owen and ran for another.

The Bobcats took the opening kickoff and went three and out. After the punt, Akron took the ball and went on an 11 play 54-yard drive. However, the drive stalled at the Ohio 37 and the Zips settled for a 49-yard field goal by Garrison Smith. Akron took an early lead but this turned out to be the only real sustained drive of the day for the Zips.

Over the next four drives the teams combined for only one first down. Early in the second quarter the Bobcats moved the ball but were stopped at the Akron 28. Gianni Spetic missed a 44-yard field goal attempt. DJ Walker intercepted a Ben Finley pass on the 3rd play of the ensuing drive and set Ohio up in Akron territory. They took advantage four plays later. Running back Anthony Tyus took the ball on a run from the 4-yard line and fumbled the ball into the endzone where it was recovered by tight end Mason Williams. Ohio took a 7–3 lead. It did not last. After a quick Akron punt Ohio found itself pinned at their own 2-yard line. They could not move the ball and punted from their own end zone. Jordan Castleberry's return set Akron up at the Ohio 31. Three plays later Finley hit Jake Newell for a touchdown to retake the lead for the Zips with 1:20 left in the half. However, Ohio still had all three timeouts and was able to march down he field for a touchdown as Navarro found Owen from 18-yards out to retake the lead with 0:17 remaining in the half.

At the start of the second half neither offense was able to move the ball. At the end of Ohio's second possession punter Jack Wilson pinned Akron at their own 8-yard line. On 3rd and 15 from the 3-yard line Finley dropped back and was tackled in the endzone by Marcell Walker-Burgess. After the free-kick, Ohio got to the Akron 30 but Navarro was sacked and fumbled. Ohio's defense was starting to dominate the game and Akron could not capitalize and was forced to punt form the Ohio 38 and again pinned Ohio deep at their own 3. After another exchange of three and outs, Navarro hit Owen who showed scampered 75-yards for a 23–10 lead with 11:53 remaining.

After Akron was stopped on downs, the Bobcats had on opportunity to work the lock but Tyus fumbled on the first play of the drive. Three plays later, a tipped Finley pass was intercepted by Austin Brawley. Ohio was now taking possession at their own 15. This time they took 5:30 off the clock with a 10-play drive. Navarro scored on 3rd and goal from the 3 -yard line with 0:59 remaining to seal the win. Ohio outgained Akron 440 to 178 and the defense held the Zips to -18 yards rushing.

Navarro threw for 204 yards and led the team with 113 rushing yards. His performance earned him MAC co-offensive player of the week honors. Coleman Owen had 6 catches for 130 yards. Aside from the two interceptions, Ben Finley threw for 196 yards for Akron. Bryan McCoy led the Zips with 14 tackles. Avery Brook might have had the best day for Akron as he averaged 47.3 yards over 7 punts and pinned Ohio near their own goal twice.

=== At Central Michigan ===
Ohio Bobcats (3–2) at Central Michigan Chippewas (3–2) – Game summary

| Quarter | 1 | 2 | 3 | 4 | Total |
|---|---|---|---|---|---|
| Bobcats | 3 | 21 | 0 | 3 | 27 |
| Chippewas | 0 | 0 | 8 | 17 | 25 |

at Kelly/Shorts Stadium • Mount Pleasant, MI

- Date: October 12
- Game time: 4:00 p.m.
- Game weather: Sunny • Temperature: 62 °F (17 °C) • Wind: SE 3 mph
- Game attendance: 22,437
- Referee: Rich Edwards (MAC)
- TV announcers (ESPNU): Matt Schumacker (play-by-play) and Dustin Fox (analyst)
- Ohio Notes, boxscore

Game information

First quarter

- (11:53) OHIO – Gianni Spetic 35-yard field goal, 5 plays, 57 yards, 3:07; OHIO 3–0

Second quarter

- (10:03) OHIO – Parker Navarro 8-yard run (Gianni Spetic kick), 9 plays, 75 yards, 4:15; OHIO 10–0
- (03:11) OHIO – Coleman Owen 5-yard pass from Parker Navarro (Gianni Spetic kick), 7 plays, 55 yards, 3:27; OHIO 17–0
- (01:01) OHIO – Duncan Brune 4-yard run (Gianni Spetic kick), 5 plays, 70 yards, 0:53; OHIO 24–0

Third quarter

- (08:19) CMU – Marion Lukes 3-yard run (Tyler Jefferson pass to Marion Lukes), 8 plays, 67 yards, 4:37; OHIO 24–8

Fourth quarter

- (11:53) CMU – Tristan Mattson 37-yard field goal, 9 plays, 56 yards, 5:30; OHIO 24–11
- (09:00) CMU – Marion Lukes 4-yard run (Tristan Mattson kick), 3 plays, 15 yards, 1:14; OHIO 24–18
- (05:17) OHIO – Gianni Spetic 46-yard field goal, 7 plays, 47 yards, 3:43; OHIO 27–18
- (01:52) CMU – Marion Lukes 28-yard run (Tristan Mattson kick), 11 plays, 75 yards, 3:25; OHIO 27–25

| Statistics | OHIO | CMU |
|---|---|---|
| First downs | 18 | 16 |
| Total yards | 59–424 | 61–292 |
| Rushing yards | 37–277 | 39–161 |
| Passing yards | 147 | 131 |
| Passing: Comp–Att–Int | 13–22–0 | 14–22–0 |
| Time of possession | 29:31 | 30:29 |

| Team | Category | Player | Statistics |
|---|---|---|---|
| Ohio | Passing | Parker Navarro | 13/22, 147 yards, 1 TD |
| Ohio | Rushing | Parker Navarro | 14 carries, 176 yards, 1 TD |
| Ohio | Receiving | Chase Hendricks | 2 receptions, 74 yards |
| Central Michigan | Passing | Tyler Jefferson | 8/13, 95 yards |
| Central Michigan | Rushing | Marion Lukes | 20 carries, 110 yards, 3 TD |
| Central Michigan | Receiving | Chris Parker | 3 receptions, 33 yards |

Ohio travelled to Mount Pleasant, Michigan to play Central Michigan against whom they came in with a 5–27–2 record since CMU joined the MAC in 1975. The Chippewas entered the game with three wins and two losses. They had one conference win against Ball State, another FBS win against San Diego State and opened the season with a win over FCS Central Connecticut. They had losses to FIU and Illinois.

Ohio took the opening kickoff and, mostly on the strength of a 53-yard run by Parker Navarro, reached the CMU 18 but had to settle for a short field goal. After a Chippewa three and out, Anthony Tyus reached the CMU 16 but lost a fumble. Early in the second quarter a nine play drive finally found paydirt as Navarro ran it in from eight yards out. The Bobcat defense forced their fourth punt in as many possessions and the offense again took advantage. This time Navarro found Coleman Owen on a five-yard touchdown pass with 3:11 remaining in the half. After another CMU three and out the Bobcats took over with 1:40 left. Five plays later Duncan Brune scored his first touchdown as a Bobcat on a four-yard rush.

To this point the Ohio defense was dominating the game, holding Central Michigan to 70 total yards in the first half, and it continued as Central Michigan took the second-half kickoff and again punted after three offensive plays. The Ohio offense began to struggle and punted in the first of three straight three and out possessions. The Chips now tried to start an incredible rally. They went 67 yards in 8 plays as Marion Lukes scored his first on three touchdowns on a three-yard rush. A successful two-point conversion made the score 24–8. After Ohio's third straight three play drive, CMU responded with a possession that went nowhere. But Navarro was sacked on the 2nd play of Ohio's next drive and fumbled at the Bobcat 15. CMU got right back in the game 3 plays later on Luke's second touchdown. Now ahead by 6 with nine minutes remaining, and not having earned a first down the second half, Ohio's offense responded with but were faced with a fourth and four at the CMU 28 with 5:17 remaining. They elected to send out kicker Gianni Spetic who connected on a 46-yard field goal. Central Michigan scored on Luke's third touchdown on the ensuing drive but they took eleven plays and used up most of the clock. Ohio kept the ball on the ground and, after two first downs, locked up the win.

Ohio outgained CMU 424 to 292. Navarro led Ohio in rushing for the second straight game as he had 176 of the team's 283 yards. He also threw for 147. Marion Lukes, in addition to the three touchdowns, had 110 yards on the ground for the Chips. A big part of the story was penalties as CMU lost 133 yards on 15 total penalties and had several big plays negated.

=== At Miami (OH) (Battle of the Bricks) ===
Ohio Bobcats (4–2) at Miami RedHawks (2–4) – Game summary

| Quarter | 1 | 2 | 3 | 4 | Total |
|---|---|---|---|---|---|
| Bobcats | 0 | 0 | 6 | 14 | 20 |
| RedHawks | 3 | 13 | 14 | 0 | 30 |

at Yager Stadium • Oxford, OH

- Date: October 19
- Game time: 3:30 p.m.
- Game weather: Sunny • Temperature: 71 °F (22 °C) • Wind: SE 5 mph
- Game attendance: 17,021
- Referee: Matt Packowski (MAC)
- TV announcers (ESPN+): Kevin Fitzgerald (play-by-play) and Charlie Strong (analyst)
- Ohio notes, boxscore

Game information

First quarter

- (06:42) M-OH – Dom Dzioban 28-yard field goal, 8 plays, 62 yards, 4:24; M-OH 3–0

Second quarter

- (08:18) M-OH – Reggie Virgil 14-yard pass from Brett Gabbert (Dom Dzioban kick), 8 plays, 58 yards, 5:08; M-OH 10–0
- (00:19) M-OH – Javon Tracy 8-yard pass from Brett Gabbert (kick failed), 6 plays, 43 yards, 2:19; M-OH 16–0

Third quarter

- (07:29) OHIO – Anthony Tyus III 1-yard run (pass failed), 15 plays, 75 yards, 7:31; M-OH 16–6
- (01:47) M-OH – Keyon Mozee 58-yard run (Dom Dzioban kick), 1 plays, 58 yards, 0:11; M-OH 23–6
- (00:43) M-OH – Cade McDonald 28-yard pass from Brett Gabbert (Dom Dzioban kick), 1 plays, 28 yards, 0:07; M-OH 30–6

Fourth quarter

- (05:58) OHIO – Nolan McCormick 1-yard run (Nick Poulos Pass to Caleb Gossett), 11 plays, 63 yards, 4:12; M-OH 30–14
- (00:06) OHIO – Nick Poulos 11-yard run (pass failed), 11 plays, 90 yards, 1:45; M-OH 30–20

| Statistics | OHIO | M-OH |
|---|---|---|
| First downs | 21 | 15 |
| Total yards | 76–291 | 51–329 |
| Rushing yards | 33–110 | 40–150 |
| Passing yards | 181 | 178 |
| Passing: Comp–Att–Int | 22–43–2 | 14–21–0 |
| Time of possession | 30:41 | 29:20 |

| Team | Category | Player | Statistics |
|---|---|---|---|
| Ohio | Passing | Nick Poulos | 9/21, 93 yards |
| Ohio | Rushing | Parker Navarro | 11 carries, 38 yards |
| Ohio | Receiving | Rodney Harris II | 7 receptions, 82 yards |
| Miami (OH) | Passing | Brett Gabbert | 14/21, 179 yards, 3 TD |
| Miami (OH) | Rushing | Keyon Mozee | 16 carries, 111 yards, 1 TD |
| Miami (OH) | Receiving | Cade McDonald | 5 receptions, 84 yards, 1 TD |

Ohio travelled to Oxford, Ohio to take on defending MAC champion Miami. Miami was picked to repeat but hosted Ohio in the 100th Battle of the Bricks sporting a 2–4 record having opened the season with three consecutive non-conference losses to power conference opponents Northwestern, Cincinnati and Notre Dame. They then earned an FBS win over Massachusetts and split MAC games with Toledo and Eastern Michigan.

Miami opened the scoring on their second possession with a short field goal by Dom Dzioban with 6:42 remaining in the first quarter. The defenses stiffened and there were five straight three-and-out possessions. Miami opened up a two score lead when Brett Gabbart hit Reggie Virgil with a 14-yard touchdown pass with 8:18 left in the half. To this point Ohio had not achieved a first down after four possessions. However, they found a little offense on the ensuing drive and after nine plays they had reached the Miami 32. On the next play Parker Navarro was intercepted by Raion Strader who returned it to the Miami 43 and the RedHawks took over with 2:28 remaining in the half. It was enough time as Miami took control of the game with 0:19 when Gabbert connected with Javon Tracy.

Ohio took the opening kick of the second half and when on a 15-play touchdown drive that ate 7:31 off of clock that culminated in a 1-yard plunge by Anthony Tyus III. Miami was forced to punt but the Bobcat effort to get back in the game went sour when a short Ohio punt on the following drive set Miami up on their own 42. Miami quickly re-established control of the game when Keyon Mozee scored on a 58-yard run on the following play. Navarro threw his second interception to Matt Salopel on the third play of the ensuing drive and Miami again scored in one play on Gabbert's third touchdown pass. This time it was Cade McDonald on the receiving end of a 28-yard pass that put the RedHawks up 30–6. After an exchange of punts, the Bobcats went on another long 11-play scoring drive ending in a 1-yard rush by Nolan McCormick. Ohio was down by 16 with just 5:58 remaining in the game. Ohio's defense forced Miami punts on their next two possessions but their offense was unable to put anymore points of the board until Nick Poulos, in relief of Navarro, ran it in with just five seconds left to make the final 30–20.

Miami outgained Ohio 329 to 291. Gabbert led Miami's offense with 178 passing yards and three touchdowns. Mozee had 111 rushing yards including the long touchdown run. McDonald had 5 catches to 84 yards and a touchdown. Miami linebacker Matt Salopek earned MAC co-defensive player of the week honors with a 10 tackles and an interception. Receivers Rodney Harris II and Chase Hendricks might have had the best days for the Bobcats in a game where they ball was distributed between many athletes with 7 and 5 respective receptions for 82 and 50 yards.

=== vs. Buffalo ===
Buffalo Bulls (4–3) at Ohio Bobcats (4–3) – Game summary

| Quarter | 1 | 2 | 3 | 4 | Total |
|---|---|---|---|---|---|
| Bulls | 0 | 10 | 6 | 0 | 16 |
| Bobcats | 3 | 21 | 9 | 14 | 47 |

at Peden Stadium • Athens, OH

- Date: October 26
- Game time: 12:00 p.m.
- Game weather: Sunny • Temperature: 58 °F (14 °C)
- Game attendance: 16,048
- Referee: Greg Sujack (MAC)
- TV announcers (CBSSN): Dave Ryan (play-by-play) and Adam Brenemen (analyst)
- Ohio notes, boxscore

Game information

First quarter

- (01:38) OHIO – Gianni Spetic 23-yard field goal, 11 plays, 65 yards, 5:38; OHIO 3–0

Second quarter

- (12:47) BUFF – Messiah Burch 27-yard run (Upton Bellenfant kick), 8 plays, 75 yards, 3:51; BUFF 7–3
- (08:21) OHIO – Rickey Hunt Jr. 46-yard run (Gianni Spetic kick), 9 plays, 80 yards, 4:21; OHIO 10–7
- (06:12) OHIO – Coleman Owen 65-yard pass from Parker Navarro (Gianni Spetic kick), 2 plays, 73 yards, 0:52; OHIO 17–7
- (03:23) BUFF – Upton Bellenfant 40-yard field goal, 7 plays, 53 yards, 2:49; OHIO 17–10
- (06:12) OHIO – Coleman Owen 13-yard pass from Parker Navarro (Gianni Spetic kick), 7 plays, 75 yards, 2:20; OHIO 24–10

Third quarter

- (08:21) OHIO – Nolan McCormick 2-yard run (Gianni Spetic kick), 6 plays, 80 yards, 3:05; OHIO 31–10
- (02:28) BUFF – Victor Snow 21-yard pass from C. J. Ogbanna (pass failed), 11 plays, 75 yards, 3:41; OHIO 31–16
- (02:28) OHIO – Kadin Schmitz 100-yard Defensive PAT Conversion, OHIO 33–16

Fourth quarter

- (08:21) OHIO – Coleman Owen 22-yard run (Gianni Spetic kick), 6 plays, 57 yards, 2:41; OHIO 40–16
- (02:28) OHIO – Shay Taylor 30-yard Interception Return (Gianni Spetic kick), OHIO 47–16

| Statistics | BUFF | OHIO |
|---|---|---|
| First downs | 22 | 22 |
| Total yards | 72–383 | 60–489 |
| Rushing yards | 33–126 | 41–258 |
| Passing yards | 257 | 231 |
| Passing: Comp–Att–Int | 24–39–1 | 14–19–1 |
| Time of possession | 29:29 | 30:31 |

| Team | Category | Player | Statistics |
|---|---|---|---|
| Buffalo | Passing | C. J. Ogbonna | 24/39, 257 yards, 1 TD, 1 INT |
| Buffalo | Rushing | Al-Jay Henderson | 14 carries, 81 yards |
| Buffalo | Receiving | Victor Snow | 5 receptions, 75 yards, 1 TD |
| Ohio | Passing | Parker Navarro | 14/19, 231 yards, 2 TD, 1 INT |
| Ohio | Rushing | Rickey Hunt Jr. | 9 carries, 89 yards, 1 TD |
| Ohio | Receiving | Coleman Owen | 6 receptions, 146 yards, 2 TD |

Ohio hosted Buffalo with both teams sporting 4–3 overall records and 2-3 conference records. The Bulls were coming off of a loss to Western Michigan but scored wins in the first two MAC games over two of the early favorites in Northern Illinois, and Toledo. Explosive plays helped Ohio to earn a 47–16 win. Ohio improved to 15–1 at home since the start of the 2022 season and 12–1 at home against Buffalo since Buffalo joined the MAC in 1999.

It took until near the end of the first quarter before either offense was able to post any points. The first three drives resulted in a Buffalo punt, Marquis Cooper intercepting a Parker Navarro pass to end a Bobcat drive at the Buffalo 21, and a missed 47-yard field goal by Upton Bellenfant. Gianni Spetic was able to finish Ohio's 11-play drive on their second possession with a short 23-yard field goal to give Ohio an early lead. The lead didn't last long and Buffalo back Messiah Burch escaped for a 27-yard touchdown run on the ensuing drive. Rickey Hunt Jr. gave Ohio the lead right back with the first of several huge plays for the Bobcats as he ripped off a 46-yard touchdown to give Ohio a 10–7 lead. Following a Buffalo three and out Parker Navarro found Coleman Owen on a long 65-yard touchdown pass on the second play of the following drive. Buffalo was forced to settle for a field goal with 3:23 left in the half. The Bobcat offense took the field and chewed up most of what was left in the half before Owen was on the scoring end on another Navarro pass as Ohio took a 24–10 lead into the locker room.

Ohio was unable to do anything after receiving the 2nd half kickoff but halted Buffalo's subsequent scoring chance when Bralen Henderson recovered a fumble on a sack of C. J. Ogbonna at the Ohio 20. Ohio marched down the field in six plays and took control of the game when Nolan McCormick plunged into the end-zone. Buffalo again moved the ball on their next drive. This time they converted it into a touchdown on the 11th play on a 21-yard catch by Victor Snow. Their effort to get back in the game was significantly hampered when Kadin Schmitz intercepted Ogbonna's conversion pass and returned it 100 yards for two points for the Bobcats. After a short Ohio punt the Bulls had an opportunity to starting at mid-field. They were stopped on downs without a first-down. Six plays later Owen ended most of what might have been left of Buffalo's hope when he scored his third touchdown of the game. This time it was on the ground as he scored on a 22-yard reverse. Shay Taylor then ended all hoped when he returned on Ogbonna interception for a touchdown two plays later. Ohio's defense stopped the Bull's on downs. Ohio's running game then chewed most of what was left of the clock before being stopped on downs at the two-minute timeout. The Bulls were unable to convert any points in the final two minutes.

With the 31 point margin of victory, Ohio only outgained Buffalo by a margin of 489 to 383. It was big plays that helped Ohio to the win. Coleman Owen provided more than anyone with 6 receptions for 146 yards and two receiving touchdowns and a rushing touchdown. He earned MAC offensive player of the week honors for his efforts. Parker Navarro had 81 yards on the ground and rushing touchdown along with 231 passing yards, averaging 12.2 yards per attempt and a touchdown. Rickey Hunt Jr. led the team with 89 rushing yards with a long touchdown run. Shay Taylor had 11 tackles, a sack, and an interception returned for a touchdown. He earned MAC defensive player of the week. Kadin Schmitz had 8 tackles along with a rarely seen pick-two conversion return.

Ogbonna had 257 passing yards and a touchdown for the Bulls. Al-Jay Henderson had 81 rushing yards and Victor Snow had 75 receiving yards and a TD. Red Murdock, Jalen McNair, and Shaun Dolac all had double figures in tackles with Murdock leading the way with 15.

=== At Kent State ===
Ohio Bobcats (5–3) at Kent State Golden Flashes (0–8) – Game summary

| Quarter | 1 | 2 | 3 | 4 | Total |
|---|---|---|---|---|---|
| Bobcats | 10 | 10 | 14 | 7 | 41 |
| Golden Flashes | 0 | 0 | 0 | 0 | 0 |

at Dix Stadium • Kent, OH

- Date: November 6
- Game time: 7:00 p.m. EDT
- Game weather: Cloudy • Temperature: 58 °F (14 °C) • Wind: SW 3 mph
- Game attendance: 5,662
- Referee: Billy Williams (MAC)
- TV announcers (ESPNU): Mike Corey (play-by-play) and Craig Haubert (analyst)
- Ohio notes, boxscore

Game information

First quarter

- (08:30) OHIO – Gianni Spetic 42-yard field goal, 11 plays, 49 yards, 5:09; OHIO 3–0
- (05:01) OHIO – Anthony Tyus III 19-yard run (Gianni Spetic kick), 5 plays, 61 yards, 1:54; OHIO 10–0

Second quarter

- (11:54) OHIO – Gianni Spetic 36-yard field goal, 6 plays, 18 yards, 3:25; OHIO 13–0
- (03:07) OHIO – Parker Navarro 3-yard run (Gianni Spetic kick), 10 plays, 72 yards, 5:16; OHIO 20–0

Third quarter

- (14:47) OHIO – Eamonn Dennis 96-yard kickoff return (Gianni Spetic Kick), OHIO 27–0
- (6:52) OHIO – Coleman Owen 61-yard punt return (Gianni Spetic Kick), OHIO 34–0

Fourth quarter

- (14:13) OHIO – Bryce Butler 7-yard pass from Nick Poulos (Gianni Spetic kick), 6 plays, 79 yards, 3:14; OHIO 41–0

| Statistics | OHIO | KENT |
|---|---|---|
| First downs | 23 | 7 |
| Total yards | 70–407 | 52–114 |
| Rushing yards | 44–258 | 34–52 |
| Passing yards | 149 | 62 |
| Passing: Comp–Att–Int | 15–25–0 | 8–18–1 |
| Time of possession | 33:18 | 26:42 |

| Team | Category | Player | Statistics |
|---|---|---|---|
| Ohio | Passing | Parker Navarro | 14/24, 142 yards |
| Ohio | Rushing | Anthony Tyus III | 14 carries, 84 yards, 1 TD |
| Ohio | Receiving | Coleman Owen | 4 receptions, 61 yards |
| Kent State | Passing | Ruel Tomlinson | 8/18, 62 yards, 1 INT |
| Kent State | Rushing | Ky Thomas | 15 carries, 50 yards |
| Kent State | Receiving | Chrishon McCray | 3 receptions, 28 yards |

Ohio hosted Kent State in the first of their November midweek "MACtion" games. The Golden Flashes entered the game as the only winless team in the FBS subdivision and on a seventeen-game losing streak. They had dropped all four conference games along with three losses to power five teams and a loss to FCS opponent Saint Francis They encountered more problems as they were planning on starting third-string quarterback Tommy Ulatowski but he was unable to play and they were forced to go with true freshman walk-on Ruel Tomlinson. Kent State struggled to the tune of only 114 yards of total offense while Ohio's defense and special teams controlled the game. Ohio became bowl eligible and moved into a 4-way tie for first place in a 41–0 win.

The Golden Flashes quickly punted after receiving the opening kickoff. On their first drive of the game the Bobcats kept the ball for 11 plays but could not punch it in the endzone and had to settle for a 42-yard field goal. They were able to find the endzone on their second drive as Anthony Tyus III ran it in from 19-yards out. It remained 10–0 for the remainder of the first quarter. Kent State, on their fourth possession, finally got their initial first-down of the game with 1:27 remaining in the first but a Tomlinson pass was deflected upward by Adonis Williams Jr. and then by intercepted by Roman Parodie two plays later. Ohio started the ensuing drive at the Kent 37 but had to settle for a second field goal by Gianni Spetic early in the second quarter. Ohio got the ball back after a Kent State punt and made the score 20–0 when quarterback Parker Navarro scored on a 3-yard rush on the 10th play of the next drive. After another Golden Flash punt, Ohio tried a 55-yard field goal on the last play of the half but, after a well timed Kent State timeout negated a successful first attempt, could not convert.

Ohio's special teams started to put the game away in the third quarter. Eamonn Dennis took the opening kickoff of the half and returned it 96-yards for a touchdown. After a quick exchange of punts, Ohio forced Kent State to punt again with seven minutes remaining in the quarter. Coleman Owen provided another special team touchdown with a 61-yard punt return to make the score 34–0. After another Kent three and out Ohio took the back into Kent State territory but Tyus fumbled the chance away. Ohio scored the last points of the game on their next drive when Nick Poulos, in fourth quarter relief of Navarro, threw is only pass of the game and found Bryce Butler for a touchdown. Neither team could find much offense on each of their respective final two possessions.

The Bobcat offense outgained the Golden Flashes by almost 300 yards. Navarro threw for 142 and added 41 on the ground. Tyus and Rickey Hunt Jr. rushed for 84 and 80 yards respectively. In addition to the punt return, Owen led the Bobcats receiving corp with 4 catches for 61 yards. The Bobcat defense collected 5 sacks. Dennis's kick return earned him MAC co-special teams player of the week. Josh Baka was the bright spot for Kent State with 18 tackles.

=== vs. Eastern Michigan ===
Eastern Michigan Eagles (5–4) at Ohio Bobcats (6–3) – Game summary

| Quarter | 1 | 2 | 3 | 4 | Total |
|---|---|---|---|---|---|
| Eagles | 0 | 7 | 0 | 3 | 10 |
| Bobcats | 0 | 14 | 7 | 14 | 35 |

at Peden Stadium • Athens, OH

- Date: November 13
- Game time: 7:00 p.m. EDT
- Game weather: sunny • Temperature: 54 °F (12 °C) • Wind: E 5 mph
- Game attendance: 14,133
- Referee: Jeremy Valentine (MAC)
- TV announcers (ESPN2): Jay Alter (play-by-play) and Rocky Boiman (analyst)
- Ohio notes, boxscore

Game information

First quarter

- No scoring plays

Second quarter

- (12:47) EMU – Delbert Mimms III 18-yard pass from Cole Snyder (Jesus Gomez kick), 6 plays, 79 yards, 2:48; EMU 7–0
- (07:11) OHIO – Parker Navarro 3-yard run (Gianni Spetic kick), 10 plays, 72 yards, 5:16; Tied 7–7
- (00:13) OHIO – Anthony Tyus III 1-yard run (Gianni Spetic kick), 8 plays, 75 yards, 2:17; OHIO 14–7

Third quarter

- (06:04) OHIO – Parker Navarro 25-yard run (Gianni Spetic kick), 1 play, 25 yards, 0:07; OHIO 21–7

Fourth quarter

- (13:13) EMU – Jesus Gomez 29-yard field goal, 16 plays, 64 yards, 7:51; OHIO 21–10
- (07:20) OHIO – Parker Navarro 1-yard run (Gianni Spetic kick), 9 plays, 85 yards, 5:47; OHIO 28–10
- (02:59) OHIO – Parker Navarro 4-yard run (Gianni Spetic kick), 6 plays, 19 yards, 4:13; OHIO 35–10

| Statistics | EMU | OHIO |
|---|---|---|
| First downs | 15 | 20 |
| Total yards | 64–266 | 64–433 |
| Rushing yards | 34–111 | 32–156 |
| Passing yards | 155 | 277 |
| Passing: Comp–Att–Int | 18–30–3 | 22–32–1 |
| Time of possession | 27:57 | 32:03 |

| Team | Category | Player | Statistics |
|---|---|---|---|
| Eastern Michigan | Passing | Cole Snyder | 18/30, 155 yards, 1 TD, 3 INT |
| Eastern Michigan | Rushing | Delbert Mimms III | 16 carries, 71 yards |
| Eastern Michigan | Receiving | Oran Singleton | 5 receptions, 70 yards |
| Ohio | Passing | Parker Navarro | 22/32, 277 yards, INT |
| Ohio | Rushing | Parker Navarro | 13 carries, 106 yards, 4 TD |
| Ohio | Receiving | Coleman Owen | 8 receptions, 139 yards |

Ohio hosted Eastern Michigan in their second consecutive Wednesday night game. The Eagles came in with a 2–3 MAC conference record but with an overall winning record at 5–4 as their only non-conference loss came at Washington.

Neither offense could get anything going early on. On their second possession, Ohio held the ball for 11 plays but stalled at the EMU 11. The short field goal was blocked by Joey Zelinsky. After an exchange of punts, EMU got on the board first when Cole Snyder hit Delbert Mimms III on an 18-yard touchdown pass early in the second quarter. Neither team could get a first down on the next two drives. Ohio, starting from inside their own 12 for the third time to that point, then took the ball on their own 5. They went 95 yards in 5 plays as Parker Navarro hit Chase Hendricks, Coleman Owen, and Rodney Harris II for long gains on his only three attempts of the drive and then finished the drive himself on a 3-yard touchdown rush to tie the game. After another exchange of punts Ben McNaboe intercepted a Snyder pass to kill an Eagle scoring chance at the Ohio 25. With only 2:30 left in the half Ohio started an 8 play drive ending in an Anthony Tyus 1-yard plunge to take the lead before the half.

The Bobcats received the second half kickoff but Navarro was intercepted by Quentavius Scandrett. Tank Pearson got the ball back for Ohio with an interception of his own. Ohio was forced to punt it away but Pearson got is second interception in as many EMU drives and set Ohio up and the EMU 25. Navarro immediately cashed the turnover in with a 25-yard run on the next play with 6:04 left in the third quarter. Eastern Michigan stayed in the game with a 16 play drive that used up over a third of the time left in the game but they had to settle for a field goal that made the score 21 –10. Ohio responded with a 9-play drive of their own that ended in Navarro's third touchdown from 1-yard out to take an 18-point lead with 7:20 remaining. EMU lost their chance to get back in the game when Snyder was sacked by McNaboe and fumbled on the first play of the ensuring drive. Navarro capitalized with his 4th touchdown run for the game's final score. With the 35–10 victory, the Bobcats stayed in a three-way tie for first place in the MAC.

Navarro led the Bobcats with 106 rushing yards and tied a program record with four rushing touchdowns. He also set a personal career best with 277 passing yards. He won MAC offensive player of the week. Owen once again led the receivers with 8 catches for 139 yards. Ohio's defense forced four turnovers from an Eastern Michigan offense that had only given the ball away seven times for the season. Pearson had two interceptions while McNaboe had one and a strip-sack. Mimms had 155 hards and a touchdown for the Eagles. Snyder, who was responsible for all four turnovers, threw for 155 yards and a touchdown. After a slow start Ohio's offense go going with the help of turnovers as the Bobcats outgained the Eagles 434 to 266.

=== At Toledo ===
Ohio Bobcats (7–3) at Toledo Rockets (7–3) – Game summary

| Quarter | 1 | 2 | 3 | 4 | Total |
|---|---|---|---|---|---|
| Bobcats | 0 | 0 | 7 | 17 | 24 |
| Rockets | 0 | 7 | 0 | 0 | 7 |

at Glass Bowl • Toledo, OH

- Date: November 20
- Game time: 7:00 p.m. EDT
- Game weather: cloudy • Temperature: 42 °F (6 °C) • Wind: SW 8 mph
- Game attendance: 14,543
- Referee: Andrew Speciale (MAC)
- TV announcers (ESPN2): Clay Matvick (play-by-play) and Steve Addazio (analyst)
- Ohio notes, boxscore

Game information

First quarter

- No scoring plays

Second quarter

- (10:12) TOL – Anthony Torres 23-yard pass from Tucker Gleason (Dylan Cunanan kick), 7 plays, 50 yards, 2:16; TOL 7–0

Third quarter

- (06:20) OHIO – Parker Navarro 1-yard run (Gianni Spetic kick), 7 plays, 45 yards, 3:40; Tied 7–7

Fourth quarter

- (14:19) OHIO – Parker Navarro 2-yard run (Gianni Spetic kick), 12 plays, 53 yards, 6:27; OHIO 14–7
- (08:07) OHIO – Anthony Tyus III 1-yard run (Gianni Spetic kick), 8 plays, 60 yards, 4:46; OHIO 21–7
- (03:31) OHIO – Gianni Spetic 24-yard field goal, 6 plays, 18 yards, 2:26; OHIO 24–7

| Statistics | OHIO | TOL |
|---|---|---|
| First downs | 17 | 9 |
| Total yards | 73–367 | 51–212 |
| Rushing yards | 54–238 | 25–39 |
| Passing yards | 129 | 173 |
| Passing: Comp–Att–Int | 11–19–1 | 14–26–0 |
| Time of possession | 41:24 | 18:36 |

| Team | Category | Player | Statistics |
|---|---|---|---|
| Ohio | Passing | Parker Navarro | 11/19, 129 yards, 1 INT |
| Ohio | Rushing | Anthony Tyus III | 33 carries, 125 yards, 1 TD |
| Ohio | Receiving | Caleb Gossett | 6 receptions, 86 yards |
| Toledo | Passing | Tucker Gleason | 9/17, 136 yards, 1 TD |
| Toledo | Rushing | Willie Shaw III | 6 carries, 30 yards |
| Toledo | Receiving | Jerjuan Newton | 4 receptions, 45 yards |

Ohio next traveled to Toledo to play the Rockets. Toledo entered with 7–3 record with a non-conference win over SEC opponent Mississippi State. Their 4–2 MAC conference record had them one game behind Ohio, Miami, and Bowling Green. The last time these two programs played was when Toledo won the 2022 MAC Championship Game. Ohio entered this game having won its last trip to the Glass Bowl in 2016. That win snapped a streak of sixteen losses at the Glass Bowl since they had last won at Toledo in 1967. On a somewhat cold and somewhat windy Wednesday night, Ohio's offense controlled the clock, Ohio's defense controlled the game, and Ohio kept control of their own destiny as they overcame a first half deficit to win 24–7 slugfest. The loss eliminated Toledo from MAC championship contention.

Both offenses struggled early on as the first seven drives of the game ended in punts. Early in the second quarter, Toledo got on the board first with a 23-yard pass from Tucker Gleason to Anthony Torres. Ohio finally found some offense on the ensuing drive, holding the ball for ten plays, but could not get into field goal range. Neither offense did much for the rest of the half.

Toledo went three and out to start the second half. Ohio marched to the Toledo 5-yard line but Parker Navarro was intercepted by Mason Hooks. Ohio's defense got the ball right back as DJ Walker forced an Eric Holley III fumble that was subsequently recovered by Roman Parodie. This time, Navarro cashed it in with a 1-yard touchdown run to tie the game. On the ensuing drive Ohio's defense forced their second straight turnover. Blake Leake forced a Junior Vandeross III fumble recovered by Adonis Williams Jr. Ohio took the ball and reached a 2nd and goal at the Toledo 5 when the game's most controversial play occurred. Anthony Tyus III was stripped of the ball but it was ruled that his forward progress was stopped. Toledo forced a fourth down at the 2. Ohio elected to go for it a Navarro scored is second touchdown to take the lead for Ohio early in the fourth quarter. Now ahead and with the wind at their back, Ohio's defense controlled the fourth quarter. They forced a three and out. The Bobcats took the ball and kept it for 8 plays before Tyus scored on a 1-yard plunge. Ohio's defense then forced a 4th and 18 on Toledo's 36. They chose to go for it when John Alan Richter, in relief of Gleason, fumbled and was tackled by Shay Taylor for an 11-yard loss. With the lead and good-field position and time running out the Bobcats kept the ball on the ground and settled for a short Gianni Spetic field goal with 3:33 remaining. On the ensuing drive, Richter fumbled on a sack by Bradley Weaver that was recovered by Parodie. Ohio then ran out the clock.

Navarro passed for 129 yards and rushed for 104 and two touchdowns and won MAC offensive player of the week for the second week in a row and third time this season. Tyus had 125 rushing yards and a touchdown Caleb Gossett led Ohio with 6 receptions for 86 yards. Ohio's defense forced three turnovers while holding the Rockets to 215 total yards

=== vs. Ball State ===
Ball State Cardinals (3–8) at Ohio Bobcats (8–3) – Game summary

| Quarter | 1 | 2 | 3 | 4 | Total |
|---|---|---|---|---|---|
| Cardinals | 0 | 7 | 7 | 7 | 21 |
| Bobcats | 14 | 7 | 14 | 7 | 42 |

at Peden Stadium • Athens, OH

- Date: November 29
- Game time: 12:00 p.m. EDT
- Game weather: sunny • Temperature: 33 °F (1 °C)
- Game attendance: 11,804
- Referee: David Siegle (MAC)
- TV announcers (CBSSN): Chris Lewis (play-by-play) and Donte Whitmer (analyst)
- Ohio notes, boxscore

Game information

First quarter

- (12:18) OHIO – Coleman Owen 50-yard pass from Parker Navarro (Gianni Spetic kick), 5 plays, 78 yards, 2:37; OHIO 7–0
- (07:48) OHIO – Coleman Owen 41-yard pass from Parker Navarro (Gianni Spetic kick), 3 plays, 20 yards, 1:29; OHIO 14–0

Second quarter

- (08:25) OHIO – Parker Navarro 20-yard run (Gianni Spetic kick), 5 plays, 80 yards, 2:51; OHIO 21–0
- (06:13) BALL – Dahya Patel 33-yard pass from Kadin Semonza (Jackson Courville kick), 6 plays, 70 yards, 2:05; OHIO 21–7

Third quarter

- (13:58) OHIO – Mason Williams 15-yard pass from Parker Navarro (Gianni Spetic kick), 2 plays, 16 yards, 0:42; OHIO 28–7
- (06:40) OHIO – Parker Navarro 4-yard run (Gianni Spetic kick), 8 plays, 80 yards, 5:05; OHIO 35–7
- (03:54) BALL – Tanner Koziol 11-yard pass from Kadin Semonza (Jackson Courville kick), 7 plays, 55 yards, 2:39; OHIO 35–14

Fourth quarter

- (05:25) OHIO – Max Rodarte 19-yard pass from Nick Poulos (Gianni Spetic kick), 6 plays, 39 yards, 3:44; OHIO 42–14
- (02:42) BALL – Jamarion McDougle 27-yard pass from Kadin Semonza (Jackson Courville kick), 7 plays, 74 yards, 2:35; OHIO 42–21

| Statistics | BALL | OHIO |
|---|---|---|
| First downs | 21 | 22 |
| Total yards | 73–375 | 56–475 |
| Rushing yards | 26–42 | 41–270 |
| Passing yards | 333 | 205 |
| Passing: Comp–Att–Int | 29–47–0 | 9–15–1 |
| Time of possession | 29:16 | 30:44 |

| Team | Category | Player | Statistics |
|---|---|---|---|
| Ball State | Passing | Kadin Semonza | 29/47, 333 yards, 3 TD |
| Ball State | Rushing | Braedon Sloan | 10 carries, 31 yards |
| Ball State | Receiving | Cam Pickett | 9 receptions, 119 yards |
| Ohio | Passing | Parker Navarro | 7/11, 169 yards, 3 TD, 1 INT |
| Ohio | Rushing | Parker Navarro | 11 carries, 110 yards, 2 TD |
| Ohio | Receiving | Coleman Owen | 5 receptions, 142 yards, 2 TD |

The Bobcats hosted Ball State on Black Friday. The Bobcats knew that a win put Ohio the MAC Championship game. Ohio and Ball State had played 27 times since 1975 with the Bobcats winning 12. The Cardinals only had wins over only FCS Missouri State, winless Kent State, and an upset win over Northern Illinois. However, their loss to Vanderbilt was only by 10 and, entering with a 2–5 conference record, their first four MAC losses were by a combined 15 points. They were coming in off a 38–13 loss to MAC co-leader Bowling Green.

Ohio took the opening kickoff and scored on their fifth offensive snap Parker Navarro hit Coleman Owen on a 50-yard bomb. Ball State reached as deep as the Ohio 34 on their first drive but they were forced to punt. Three plays later Navarro and Owen hooked up deep again. This time from 41-yards. After a Cardinal three-and-out the Bobcats reached as deep as the Ball State 30 but Navarro was intercepted by Thailand Baldwin as the 3-yard line. Ball State went three-and-out again and were forced to punt deep in their own end. Ohio took over at the Cardinal 44 but were quickly forced to punt and pinned the Cardinals at their own 15. They reached midfield but were again forced to punt. This time the Bobcats marched 80-yards as it was Navarro who took it in himself this time with a 2-yard rush to put the Bobcats in control with a 21–0 lead with 8:25 remaining in the half. Ball State took the kickoff and went on a 70-yard drive that culminated in a 33-yard pass from Kadin Semonza to Dahya Patel. Seeing on opportunity to get right back in the game before the half, the Cardinals caught the Bobcats off-guard with an onsides kick. Seven plays later they faced a 4th and 1 and the Ohio 20 and elected to go for it but the conversion attempt was stuffed by the Ohio defense. Ohio punted on the ensuing drive and went into the half up by 14.

Ball State received to opening kickoff. On the first play Semonza was sacked by Bradley Weaver and fumbled. Shay Taylor recovered at the Cardinal 16-yard line. Two plays later, Navarro connected with Mason Williams for his third touchdown pass of the game. The Ohio defense then forced a Ball State punt. Ohio again marched 80-yards and went up 28 when Navarro scored his second touchdown on the ground. Seeing an opportunity for their first MAC championship since 1968, Ohio sat most of their starters for the remainder of the game.

Ball State responded and Semonza found Tanner Koziol for a touchdown on the ensuing drive. With many Bobcats starters sitting the Cardinal defense forced an Ohio three-and-out. Seeing an opportunity to get back into the game against Ohio's backups, the Cardinals reached the Ohio 25 on the last play of the third quarter. But Semonza then threw four straight incompletions and the drive ended on downs. Ohio drove into Ball State territory but a fumble by backup quarterback Nick Poulos was recovered by Riley Tolsma. Two plays later, Semonza was sacked by Taylor and his fumble was recovered by Dustin Johnson. Poulos found Max Rodarte for a touchdown to make the score 41–14 with 5:25 remaining. Semonza connected with Jamarion McDougle for a 27-yard TD on next possession but their onside kick failed and Ohio ran out the clock to earn a 42–21 victory and a spot in the MAC Championship game. Miami's concurrent win over 28–12 w over Bowling Green earned the RedHawks the oher spot in the title game The win completed an unbeaten season at home

Navarro threw for 169 yards and three touchdowns and added led the team with 110 rushing yards and two rushing touchdowns. Navarro earned MAC offensive player of the week honors for the fourth time on the season and the third week in a row. Anthony Tyus III added 109 yards on the ground. Owen scored on two early touchdown passes and joined LaVon Brazill and Donte Foster as the only receivers with a 1000-yard season. Blake Leake led Ohio with 12 tackles. Taylor forced a fumble and recovered another. Ohio outgained Ball State 475 to 375. The Bobcat defense held the Cardinals to 42 yards rushing.

Freshman quarterback Kadin Semonza threw for 333 yards and 3 touchdowns. Cam Pickett led the Cardinals with 119 yards while tight-end Tanner Koziol had 10 receptions for 88 yards and a touchdown. George Udo led them with 11 tackles.

=== vs Miami (OH) (MAC Championship / rivalry) ===
Ohio Bobcats (9–3) vs Miami RedHawks (8–4)

| Quarter | 1 | 2 | 3 | 4 | Total |
|---|---|---|---|---|---|
| Bobcats | 7 | 14 | 10 | 7 | 38 |
| RedHawks | 3 | 0 | 0 | 0 | 3 |

at Ford Field, Detroit, Michigan

- Date: Saturday December 7, 2024
- Game time: 12:00 p.m.
- Game weather: indoor
- Game attendance: 15,478
- Referee: Andrew Speciale (MAC)
- TV announcers (ESPN): Anish Shroff (play-by-play), Andre Ware (analyst), and Paul Carcaterra (sideline)
- Ohio notes, boxscore

Game information

First quarter

- (8:53) M-OH – Dom Dzioban 29-yard field goal, 11 plays, 64 yards, 6:07; M-OH 3–0
- (3:16) OHIO – Parker Navarro 4-yard run (Gianni Spetic kick), 11 plays, 75 yards, 5:37; OHIO 7–3

Second quarter

- (5:29) OHIO – Parker Navarro 1-yard run (Gianni Spetic kick), 18 plays, 82 yards, 10:14; OHIO 14–3
- (0:52) OHIO – Mason Williams 21-yard pass from Parker Navarro (Gianni Spetic kick), 10 plays, 75 yards, 3:27; OHIO 21–3

Third quarter

- (12:39) OHIO – Coleman Owen 25-yard pass from Parker Navarro (Gianni Spetic kick), 6 plays, 75 yards, 2:21; OHIO 28–3
- (3:35) OHIO – Gianni Spetic 53-yard field goal, 11 plays, 31 yards, 6:40; OHIO 31–3

Fourth quarter

- (6:45) OHIO – Anthony Tyus III 21-yard run (Gianni Spetic kick), 9 plays, 80 yards, 5:37; OHIO 38–7

| Statistics | OHIO | M-OH |
|---|---|---|
| First downs | 32 | 11 |
| Total yards | 73–467 | 48–189 |
| Rushing yards | 46–232 | 23–62 |
| Passing yards | 235 | 117 |
| Passing: Comp–Att–Int | 20–27–0 | 14–25–1 |
| Time of possession | 37:35 | 22:25 |

| Team | Category | Player | Statistics |
|---|---|---|---|
| Ohio | Passing | Parker Navarro | 20/27, 235 yards, 2 TD |
| Ohio | Rushing | Anthony Tyus III | 27 carries, 151 yards, TD |
| Ohio | Receiving | Coleman Owen | 5 receptions, 73 yards, TD |
| Miami (OH) | Passing | Brett Gabbert | 14/25, 127 yards, INT |
| Miami (OH) | Rushing | Keyon Mozee | 11 carries, 28 yards |
| Miami (OH) | Receiving | Javon Tracy | 7 receptions, 58 yards |

For the first time in its history, the MAC Championship featured the teams with the best conference records without regard to divisions. This allowed Ohio and Miami to continue the Battle of the Bricks rivalry in the championship game They played twice in the same season and played on a neutral field for the first time. Miami won the first matchup on October 19 by as score of 30–20. Both teams entered the game without having lost since the last meeting. Entering the championship game, Miami led the rivalry series 56–42–2. Ohio had won 13 of the last 18 but Miami had won the last two. In addition to the win earlier in the 2024 season, their win over Ohio during the 2023 season handed the Bobcats their second conference loss and vaulted the Redhawks to the 2023 MAC Football Championship Game where they defeated Toledo.

Miami took the opening kickoff and kept the ball for 11 plays but had to settle for a 29-yard Field Goal by Dom Dzioban. Ohio responded with an 11 play drive of their own. However, the Bobcats made it payoff with a 4-yard touchdown run by Parker Navarro. After a Mami punt Ohio took over with 0:43 remaining in the first quarter. They did not surrender the ball until Navarro scored his second touchdown 18 plays later with only 5:29 left in the half. Miami went three and out and punted the ball back to Ohio with 4:19 remaining. 10 plays later Navarro found tight end Mason Williams on a 21-yard touchdown pass with only 0:52 remaining. Miami elected to go into halftime to regroup.

Ohio took the second half kickoff. Navarro was 4 of 4 passing for 68 yards on touchdown drive that put the Bobcats in control with a 28–3 lead. Coleman Owen was on the receiving end of 57 of those yards including 23 on the culminating touchdown pass. Miami was again forced to punt which resulted in a controversial play. After a long punt return Owen fumbled which was recovered by the RedHawks at their own 13. However, Miami was called for an illegal block on the return and the result was to replay the down with Miami punting from their 23 after a 15-yard penalty was assessed. Ohio again kept the ball for 11 plays but after a sack they faced a 4th down on the 35-yard line. Ohio opted to try got a 53-yard field goal which was converted by Gianni Spetic. Ohio forced another Miami three and out and they elected to punt down by 28 with 2:27 left in the third quarter. Ohio was forced to punt on the ensuing drive. Miami reached the Ohio 14 with 12:22 remaining but a Brett Gabbert pass was intercepted in the endzone by Tank Pearson. If that didn't seal the game the 80-yard touchdown drive, mostly on the running of Anthony Tyus III, culminating on his 21-yard rush, did. Miami then turned the ball over on downs. Ohio was able to run out the clock and earn their first MAC Championship since 1968.

Ohio outgained Miami 467 to 189 and held the ball for 37 minutes in the most lopsided MAC championship game to date. Navarro won offensive player of the game with 67 yards rushing and 235 passing while accounting for four touchdowns. Tyus led the team with 151 yards rushing and a touchdown. Owen again led the receivers with 73 yards and a touchdown. Bradley Weaver and Gianni Spetic were defensive and special teams players of the game. Gabbert was held to 127 yards passing and an interception. Miami's rushing attack, led by thousand yard rusher Keyon Mozee, was limited to 63 yards.

=== Vs. Jacksonville State (Cure Bowl) ===
Ohio Bobcats (10–3) vs Jacksonville State Gamecocks (9–4)

| Quarter | 1 | 2 | 3 | 4 | Total |
|---|---|---|---|---|---|
| Bobcats | 14 | 13 | 0 | 3 | 30 |
| Gamecocks | 7 | 0 | 7 | 13 | 27 |

at Camping World Stadium • Orlando, Florida

- Date: Friday, December 20, 2024
- Game time: 12:05 p.m. EST
- Game weather: Sunny • Temperature: 67 °F (19 °C) • Wind:N 7 mph (11 km/h)
- Game attendance: 10,518
- Referee: Edwin Lee (AAC)
- TV announcers (ESPN): Brian Custer (play-by-play), Rod Gilmore (analyst), and Lauren Sisler (sideline)
- Ohio notes, boxscore

Game information

First quarter

- (5:09) OHIO – Parker Navarro 17-yard rush (Gianni Spetic kick), 7 plays, 79 yards, 3:37; OHIO 7–0
- (1:22) OHIO – Parker Navarro 8-yard rush (Gianni Spetic kick), 6 plays, 64 yards, 2:56; OHIO 14–0
- (1:12) JVSU – Cam Vaughn 75-yard pass from Tyler Huff (Garrison Rippa kick), 1 play, 75 yards, 0:10; OHIO 14–7

Second quarter

- (4:59) OHIO – Parker Navarro 7-yard rush (kick failed), 11 plays, 67 yards, 6:12; OHIO 20–7
- (0:41) OHIO – Anthony Tyus III 11-yard pass from Parker Navarro (Gianni Spetic kick), 8 plays, 80 yards, 1:16; OHIO 27–7

Third quarter

- (9:36) JVSU – Tyler Huff 7-yard rush (Garrison Rippa kick), 3 plays, 20 yards, 0:43; OHIO 27–14

Fourth quarter

- (13:19) OHIO – Gianni Spetic 38-yard field goal, 12 plays, 66 yards, 7:32; OHIO 30–14
- (9:52) JVSU – Tre Stewart 3-yard rush (run failed), 11 plays, 75 yards, 3:27; OHIO 30–20
- (3:35) JVSU – Tre Stewart 1-yard rush (Garrison Rippa kick), 10 plays, 70 yards, 3:03; OHIO 30–27

| Statistics | OHIO | JVST |
|---|---|---|
| First downs | 27 | 18 |
| Total yards | 74–488 | 67–403 |
| Rushing yards | 46–261 | 34–40 |
| Passing yards | 227 | 363 |
| Passing: Comp–Att–Int | 19–28–1 | 21–35–1 |
| Time of possession | 36:28 | 23:32 |

| Team | Category | Player | Statistics |
|---|---|---|---|
| Ohio | Passing | Parker Navarro | 19/28, 254 yards, 1 TD, 1 INT |
| Ohio | Rushing | Anthony Tyus III | 26 carries, 123 yards |
| Ohio | Receiving | Coleman Owen | 11 receptions, 111 yards |
| Jacksonville State | Passing | Tyler Huff | 21/33, 363 yards, 1 TD, 1 INT |
| Jacksonville State | Rushing | Tre Stewart | 15 carries, 35 yards, 2 TD |
| Jacksonville State | Receiving | Cam Vaughn | 10 receptions, 181 yards, 1 TD |

The Bobcats accepted a bid to play Jacksonville State in the StaffDNA Cure Bowl. Head coach Tim Albin left the team to accept the head coaching position at Charlotte The Bobcats were coached by Brian Smith who was named the full time head coach on December 18. This was the first ever meeting of these two programs.

The Gamecocks entered the game with a 9–4 record. They opened the season with three straight losses to Coastal Carolina, Louisville, and MAC opponent Eastern Michigan. They began play in Conference USA with eight straight wins. Western Kentucky secured a spot in the Championship Game with a win over them in the final regular season game. However, the Gamecocks won the conference championship with a win in the rematch the following week. The game was a battle of interim head coaches as Rich Rodriguez left Jacksonville State to take the head coach position at West Virginia. Rod Smith coached Jacksonville State in the game. After Sunbelt champion Marshall dropped out of their Independence Bowl matchup against American champion Army this was the only bowl game between two conference champions.

Both offenses started the game slowly as they combined for only one first down over the first four drives. On Ohio's 3rd drive Parker Navarro was 4 for 4 on passes to Coleman Owen and Anthony Tyus III had 2 carries for 20 yard before Navarro took it him itself from the JSU 17 to give the Bobcats a first quarter lead. After another 3 and out by Jacksonville state, the Ohio offense went back to work and went 64 yards in 6 plays behind one Own reception and the rest on the legs on Tyus and Navarro. It was again Navarro who punched it in on the ground. After the kickoff, it only took the Gamecocks one play to get back into the game. Tyler Huff hit Cam Vaughn on a 75-yard touchdown strike near the end of the first quarter. After an exchange of punts, the Bobcats retook a two score lead with an 11-drive that culminated on Navarro's third rushing touchdown. Their extra point attempt failed. Jacksonville State reached the Ohio 17 on the next possession when fight broke out and linebacker Shay Taylor was ejected for stepping on Huff. Two play's later they were pushed back by a sack of Huff by Bradley Weaver and Blake Leake before Garrison Rippa missed a short field goal attempt that hit the upright. The Ohio offense kept the ball for nearly the whole rest of the half and took a three score lead when Tyus scored on an 11-yard pass to give Ohio a 27–7 halftime lead.

The Gamecocks punted on their first possession of the second half and pinned the Bobcats at their own 10. After two penalties against Ohio, a shanked punt set JSU up at the OU 20-yard line. It only took the Gamecocks three plays to get back within two scores when Huff ran it in himself. Ohio went three and out and JSU gave Ohio a change to retake control when Weaver recovered a fumble on the Jacksonville State 22 but Tyus fumbled to right back on the next play. JSU threatened to get right back into the game when the reached the Ohio 33 where Huff was intercepted by Blake Leake. A 13-play drive by Ohio took over 7 minutes off the clock but the Bobcats had to settle for 38-yard field goal by Gianni Spetic to take a 16-point lead early in the 4th. Tre Stewart scored on a three-yard rush on the ensuing drive but the attempt at a two-point conversion to get back within one score failed. The Bobcats reached the JSU 15 on the following possession but their chance to put the game away was lost when Navarro was intercepted by Ky'won McCray. Jacksonville stayed in the game with a 10-play touchdown drive and got within three when Stewart scored on a one-yard plunge. However, Ohio then kept the ball on the ground and two first downs sealed the win.

The win gave Brian Smith his first ever win, Ohio its first ever 11 win season, and extended Ohio's bowl winning streak to six games. The offensive trio of quarterback Parker Navarro, running back Anthony Tyus, and wide receiver Coleman Owen controlled the game for Ohio. Navarro was named the game's MVP. He had 254 yards and a touchdown through the air and ran for 119 yards and three touchdowns on the ground. He became only the second ever Ohio quarterback to rush for 1000 yards in a season. Tyus led the team with 123 rushing yards and scored on a touchdown pass. Owen had 11 receptions for 111 and broke LaVon Brazill's school record for receiving yards in as season. Blake Leake led Ohio with 11 tackles, 0.5 sacks, and had a key interception. Ohio outgained Jacksonville State 488 to 403 and held the Gamecocks to 43 rushing yards. Huff led Jacksonville State's comeback attempt and finished with 363 passing yards. Cam Vaughn had 184 receiving yards and a touchdown. Curley Young Jr. and Fred Perry led JSU with 12 tackles each.

== Statistics ==
Final Statistics through December 20, 2024

=== Team ===
| | Ohio | Opp |
|---|---|---|
| Scoring | 410 | 254 |
| Points per game | 29.29 | 18.14 |
| First downs | 307 | 232 |
| Rushing | 155 | 81 |
| Passing | 123 | 137 |
| Penalty | 29 | 14 |
| Rushing yards | 3298 | 1703 |
| Avg per play | 5.3 | 3.0 |
| Avg per game | 215.6 | 91.9 |
| Rushing touchdowns | 35 | 14 |
| Passing yards | 2667 | 2975 |
| Att-Comp-Int | 345-217-12 | 433–265–11 |
| Avg per pass | 7.73 | 6.87 |
| Avg per catch | 12.29 | 11.22 |
| Avg per game | 190.50 | 212.50 |
| Passing touchdowns | 15 | 16 |
| Total offense | 5686 | 4261 |
| Avg per play | 6.2 | 4.9 |
| Avg per game | 406.1 | 304.4 |
| Fumbles-Lost | 15-10 | 27–9 |
| Penalties-Yards | 76-626 | 79-718 |
| Avg per game | 44.71 | 51.29 |

| | Ohio | Opp |
|---|---|---|
| Punts-Yards | 60-2432 | 75–3099 |
| Avg per punt | 40.53 | 41.32 |
| Time of possession/Game | 32:38 | 27:20 |
| 3rd down conversions | 81-170 | 73–194 |
| 4th down conversions | 6-10 | 11–23 |
| Touchdowns scored | 53 | 31 |
| Field goals-Attempts | 13-16 | 13–16 |
| PAT-Attempts | 47-48 | 28–29 |
| Attendance | | |
| Games/Avg per Game | | |
| Neutral Site | | |

=== Individual Leaders ===
==== Passing ====
Passing statistics
| # | Name | GP | GS | Record | Cmp | Att | Pct | Yds | Y/A | Y/G | Lng | TD | Int | Rtg |
|---|---|---|---|---|---|---|---|---|---|---|---|---|---|---|
| 13 | Parker Navarro | 13 | 13 | 11−2 | 195 | 295 | 66.10 | 2396 | 8.12 | 184.31 | 75 | 13 | 11 | 141.41 |
| 8 | Nick Poulos | 8 | 1 | 0−1 | 22 | 49 | 44.9 | 271 | 5.5 | 33.88 | 30 | 2 | 1 | 100.7 |
| Totals | | 14 | 14 | 11−3 | 217 | 345 | 62.90 | 2667 | 7.73 | 190.50 | 75 | 15 | 12 | 135.23 |

==== Rushing ====
Rushing statistics
| # | NAME | GP | ATT | GAIN | AVG | TD | LONG | AVG/G |
|---|---|---|---|---|---|---|---|---|
| 2 | Anthony Tyus III | 13 | 237 | 1234 | 5.2 | 9 | 46 | 94.92 |
| 13 | Parker Navarro | 13 | 160 | 1062 | 6.6 | 18 | 55 | 81.69 |
| 28 | Rickey Hunt Jr. | 13 | 76 | 393 | 5.2 | 2 | 59 | 30.23 |
| 8 | Nick Poulos | 8 | 28 | 149 | 5.3 | 1 | 22 | 18.63 |
| 22 | Duncan Brune | 14 | 26 | 84 | 3.2 | 1 | 8 | 6.00 |
| 21 | Nolan McCormick | 9 | 20 | 76 | 3.8 | 2 | 9 | 8.44 |
| 10 | Eamonn Dennis | 11 | 5 | 30 | 6.0 | 0 | 10 | 2.73 |
| 6 | Coleman Owen | 14 | 2 | 26 | 13.0 | 1 | 22 | 1.86 |
| 85 | Mason Williams | 14 | 1 | 7 | 7.0 | 1 | 7 | 0.50 |
| | Team | 14 | 19 | -42 | -2.2 | 0 | 0 | -3.00 |
| | TOTALS | 14 | 574 | 3019 | 5.3 | 35 | 59 | 215.64 |

==== Receiving ====
Receiving statistics
| # | NAME | GP | CTH | YDS | AVG | TD | LONG | AVG/G |
|---|---|---|---|---|---|---|---|---|
| 6 | Coleman Owen | 14 | 78 | 1216 | 15.59 | 8 | 75 | 86.86 |
| 7 | Chase Hendricks | 14 | 40 | 467 | 11.68 | 1 | 56 | 33.36 |
| 11 | Rodney Harris II | 14 | 23 | 289 | 12.57 | 0 | 52 | 20.64 |
| 85 | Mason Williams | 14 | 19 | 211 | 11.11 | 2 | 21 | 15.07 |
| 88 | Caleb Gossett | 14 | 15 | 144 | 9.60 | 0 | 344 | 10.29 |
| 2 | Anthony Tyus III | 13 | 16 | 137 | 8.56 | 2 | 19 | 10.54 |
| 3 | Max Rodarte | 11 | 6 | 80 | 13.33 | 1 | 23 | 7.27 |
| 10 | Eamonn Dennis | 11 | 3 | 26 | 8.67 | 0 | 16 | 2.36 |
| 28 | Rickey Hunt Jr. | 13 | 6 | 23 | 3.83 | 0 | 8 | 1.77 |
| 12 | Eian Pugh | 11 | 5 | 37 | 7.40 | 0 | 14 | 3.36 |
| 14 | Bryce Butler | 14 | 1 | 7 | 7.00 | 1 | 7 | 0.50 |
| 69 | Parker Titsworth | 14 | 1 | 5 | 5.00 | 0 | 5 | 0.36 |
| 86 | Jake Bruno | 14 | 2 | 3 | 1.50 | 0 | 4 | 0.21 |
| 21 | Nolan McCormick | 9 | 1 | 2 | 2.00 | 0 | 2 | 0.22 |
| | TOTALS | 14 | 216 | 2647 | 12.25 | 15 | 75 | 189.07 |

==== Defense ====
Defense statistics
| # | NAME | GP | SOLO | AST | TOT | TFL-YDS | SACK-YDS | INT | BU | QBH | FR | FF | BLK | SAF | TD |
|---|---|---|---|---|---|---|---|---|---|---|---|---|---|---|---|
| 9 | Blake Leake | 14 | 35 | 55 | 90 | 3.5-8 | 0.5-3 | 1 | 3 | 2 | 0 | 1 | 0 | 0 | |
| 6 | Dustin Johnson | 14 | 46 | 31 | 77 | 1.5-3 | 0-0 | 0 | 4 | 0 | 1 | 0 | 0 | 0 | |
| 35 | Shay Taylor | 13 | 30 | 42 | 72 | 10.0-44 | 3.0-27 | 1 | 4 | 3 | 1 | 2 | 0 | 0 | |
| 17 | Marcel Walker-Burgess | 14 | 33 | 23 | 56 | 8.0-38 | 6.0-32 | 1 | 2 | 8 | 0 | 2 | 0 | 1 | |
| 21 | DJ Walker | 14 | 34 | 19 | 53 | 7.0-19 | 0-0 | 1 | 7 | 0 | 0 | 1 | 0 | 0 | |
| 4 | Roman Parodie | 13 | 29 | 22 | 51 | 0-0 | 0-0 | 1 | 11 | 0 | 2 | 0 | 0 | 0 | |
| 7 | Tank Pearson | 13 | 33 | 17 | 50 | 0.5-2 | 0-0 | 4 | 6 | 0 | 0 | 0 | 0 | 0 | |
| 8 | Ben McNaboe | 14 | 15 | 29 | 44 | 7.5-31 | 4.0-25 | 1 | 3 | 8 | 0 | 2 | 0 | 0 | |
| 94 | Bradley Weaver | 13 | 24 | 20 | 44 | 15.0-97 | 8.5-75 | 0 | 0 | 10 | 1 | 3 | 1 | 0 | |
| 0 | Austin Brawley | 7 | 23 | 15 | 38 | 1.5-2 | 0-0 | 1 | 2 | 0 | 0 | 0 | 0 | 0 | |
| 19 | Kadin Schmitz | 14 | 16 | 17 | 33 | 4.0-33 | 3.5-32 | 0 | 0 | 1 | 0 | 0 | 0 | 0 | |
| 5 | Adonis Williams Jr. | 9 | 19 | 14 | 33 | 1.0-6 | 0-0 | 0 | 3 | 0 | 1 | 0 | 0 | 0 | |
| 11 | CJ Doggette | 13 | 9 | 23 | 32 | 7.0-27 | 3.0-13 | 0 | 0 | 3 | 0 | 1 | 0 | 0 | |
| 10 | Cam Rice | 12 | 10 | 20 | 30 | 8.5-37 | 3.0-27 | 0 | 1 | 5 | 0 | 0 | 0 | 0 | |
| 30 | Stellan Bowman | 12 | 8 | 18 | 26 | 2.5-5 | 0-0 | 0 | 0 | 1 | 0 | 1 | 0 | 0 | |
| 81 | Bralen Henderson | 14 | 14 | 12 | 26 | 2.0-9 | 1.0-7 | 0 | 0 | 2 | 1 | 0 | 0 | 0 | |
| 22 | Jalen Thomeson | 13 | 10 | 11 | 21 | 1.0-1 | 0-0 | 0 | 0 | 0 | 0 | 0 | 0 | 0 | |
| 12 | Michael Mack II | 14 | 10 | 4 | 14 | 1.0-3 | 0-0 | 0 | 0 | 0 | 0 | 0 | 0 | 0 | |
| 13 | Kaci Seegars | 12 | 6 | 6 | 12 | 4.5-16 | 1.0-6 | 0 | 0 | 3 | 1 | 0 | 0 | 0 | |
| 95 | Walter Bob Jr. | 7 | 5 | 5 | 10 | 0-0 | 0-0 | 0 | 0 | 0 | 0 | 0 | 0 | 0 | |
| 27 | Jack Fries | 14 | 7 | 2 | 9 | 0-0 | 0-0 | 0 | 0 | 0 | 0 | 0 | 0 | 0 | |
| 16 | Chris Mayfield | 13 | 1 | 8 | 9 | 2.5-3 | 0.5-1 | 0 | 0 | 2 | 0 | 0 | 0 | 0 | |
| 23 | Tony Mathis | 7 | 6 | 1 | 7 | 0-0 | 0-0 | 0 | 1 | 0 | 0 | 0 | 0 | 0 | |
| 29 | JT Haskins | 6 | 3 | 2 | 5 | 0-0 | 0-0 | 0 | 0 | 0 | 0 | 0 | 0 | 0 | |
| 2 | Miles Fleming | 8 | 2 | 2 | 4 | 0-0 | 0-0 | 0 | 0 | 0 | 0 | 0 | 0 | 0 | |
| 86 | Jake Bruno | 14 | 1 | 2 | 3 | 0-0 | 0-0 | 0 | 0 | 0 | 0 | 0 | 0 | 0 | |
| 15 | Reise Collier | 3 | 2 | 1 | 3 | 0-0 | 0-0 | 0 | 0 | 0 | 0 | 0 | 0 | 0 | |
| 5 | Khamani Debrow | 10 | 0 | 3 | 3 | 0-0 | 0-0 | 0 | 0 | 0 | 0 | 0 | 0 | 0 | |
| 28 | Jaylen Johnson | 7 | 1 | 2 | 3 | 0-0 | 0-0 | 0 | 0 | 0 | 0 | 0 | 0 | 0 | |
| 92 | RJ Keuchler | 2 | 1 | 2 | 3 | 1.0-3 | 0-0 | 0 | 0 | 0 | 0 | 0 | 0 | 0 | |
| 97 | Austin Mitchell | 5 | 1 | 2 | 3 | 0.5-1 | 0.5-1 | 0 | 0 | 0 | 0 | 0 | 0 | 0 | |
| 44 | Gianni Spetic | 14 | 3 | 0 | 3 | 0-0 | 0-0 | 0 | 0 | 0 | 0 | 0 | 0 | 0 | |
| 20 | Kendall Bannister | 1 | 0 | 2 | 2 | 0-0 | 0-0 | 0 | 0 | 0 | 0 | 0 | 0 | 0 | |
| 96 | Sinn Brennan | 4 | 2 | 0 | 2 | 1.0-1 | 0-0 | 0 | 0 | 0 | 0 | 0 | 0 | 0 | |
| 91 | Jay Crable | 7 | 1 | 1 | 2 | 0-0 | 0-0 | 0 | 0 | 0 | 0 | 0 | 0 | 0 | |
| 14 | Xander Karagosian | 4 | 1 | 1 | 2 | 0.5-6 | 0.5-6 | 0 | 0 | 0 | 0 | 0 | 0 | 0 | |
| 25 | Michael Molnar | 2 | 0 | 2 | 2 | 0.5-1 | 0-0 | 0 | 0 | 0 | 0 | 0 | 0 | 0 | |
| 18 | Bailey Russ | 9 | 1 | 1 | 2 | 0-0 | 0-0 | 0 | 0 | 0 | 0 | 0 | 0 | 0 | |
| 57 | Nathan Hale | 5 | 1 | 0 | 1 | 0-0 | 0-0 | 0 | 0 | 0 | 0 | 0 | 0 | 0 | |
| 55 | Jordon Jones | 11 | 1 | 0 | 1 | 0-0 | 0-0 | 0 | 0 | 0 | 0 | 0 | 0 | 0 | |
| 44 | Aiden Lowery | 1 | 1 | 0 | 1 | 0-0 | 0-0 | 0 | 0 | 0 | 0 | 0 | 0 | 0 | |
| 24 | DJ Morton | 4 | 0 | 1 | 1 | 0-0 | 0-0 | 0 | 0 | 0 | 0 | 0 | 0 | 0 | |
| 13 | Parker Navarro | 13 | 1 | 0 | 1 | 0-0 | 0-0 | 0 | 0 | 0 | 0 | 0 | 0 | 0 | |
| 6 | Coleman Owen | 14 | 1 | 0 | 1 | 0-0 | 0-0 | 0 | 0 | 0 | 0 | 0 | 0 | 0 | |
| 3 | Max Rodarte | 11 | 1 | 0 | 1 | 0-0 | 0-0 | 0 | 0 | 0 | 0 | 0 | 0 | 0 | |
| 22 | Duncan Brune | 14 | 0 | 0 | 0 | 0-0 | 0-0 | 0 | 0 | 0 | 0 | 0 | 0 | 0 | |
| 14 | Bryce Butler | 14 | 0 | 0 | 0 | 0-0 | 0-0 | 0 | 0 | 0 | 0 | 0 | 0 | 0 | |
| 10 | Eamonn Dennis | 11 | 0 | 0 | 0 | 0-0 | 0-0 | 0 | 0 | 0 | 0 | 0 | 0 | 0 | |
| 39 | Colby Garfield | 14 | 0 | 0 | 0 | 0-0 | 0-0 | 0 | 0 | 0 | 1 | 0 | 0 | 0 | |
| 88 | Caleb Gossett | 14 | 0 | 0 | 0 | 0-0 | 0-0 | 0 | 0 | 0 | 0 | 0 | 0 | 0 | |
| 11 | Rodney Harris II | 14 | 0 | 0 | 0 | 0-0 | 0-0 | 0 | 0 | 0 | 0 | 0 | 0 | 0 | |
| 7 | Chase Hendricks | 14 | 0 | 0 | 0 | 0-0 | 0-0 | 0 | 0 | 0 | 0 | 0 | 0 | 0 | |
| 28 | Rickey Hunt Jr. | 13 | 0 | 0 | 0 | 0-0 | 0-0 | 0 | 0 | 0 | 0 | 0 | 0 | 0 | |
| 21 | Nolan McCormick | 9 | 0 | 0 | 0 | 0-0 | 0-0 | 0 | 0 | 0 | 0 | 0 | 0 | 0 | |
| 8 | Nick Poulos | 8 | 0 | 0 | 0 | 0-0 | 0-0 | 0 | 0 | 0 | 0 | 0 | 0 | 0 | |
| TM | Team | 14 | 0 | 0 | 0 | 0-0 | 0-0 | 0 | 1 | 0 | 0 | 1 | 0 | 0 | |
| 2 | Anthony Tyus III | 13 | 0 | 0 | 0 | 0-0 | 0-0 | 0 | 0 | 0 | 0 | 0 | 0 | 0 | |
| 85 | Mason Williams | 14 | 0 | 0 | 0 | 0-0 | 0-0 | 0 | 0 | 0 | 0 | 0 | 0 | 0 | |
| | Total | 14 | 453 | 443 | 896 | 92.0-396 | 35.0-255 | 11 | 48 | 48 | 9 | 14 | 1 | 1 | |
| | Opponents | 14 | 451 | 578 | 1029 | 71.0-226 | 21.0-116 | 12 | 39 | 30 | 10 | 10 | 1 | 0 | |

Key: POS: Position, SOLO: Solo Tackles, AST: Assisted Tackles, TOT: Total Tackles, TFL: Tackles-for-loss, SACK: Quarterback Sacks, INT: Interceptions, BU: Passes Broken Up, PD: Passes Defended, QBH: Quarterback Hits, FR: Fumbles Recovered, FF: Forced Fumbles, BLK: Kicks or Punts Blocked, SAF: Safeties, TD : Touchdown

==== Special teams ====
Kicking statistics
| # | NAME | GP | XPM | XPA | XP% | FGM | FGA | FG% | 1–19 | 20–29 | 30–39 | 40–49 | 50+ | LNG |
|---|---|---|---|---|---|---|---|---|---|---|---|---|---|---|
| 44 | Gianni Spetic | 14 | 47 | 48 | 97.9% | 13 | 16 | 81.25% | 0/0 | 4/4 | 4/5 | 4/5 | 1/2 | 52 |
| | TOTALS | 14 | 47 | 48 | 97.9% | 13 | 16 | 81.25% | 0/0 | 4/4 | 4/5 | 4/5 | 1/2 | 52 |

Kickoff statistics
| # | NAME | GP | KICKS | YDS | AVG | TB | OB |
|---|---|---|---|---|---|---|---|
| 44 | Gianni Spetic | 14 | 71 | 4383 | 61.7 | 30 | 1 |
| | TOTALS | 14 | 71 | 4383 | 61.7 | 30 | 1 |

Punting statistics
| # | NAME | GP | PUNTS | YDS | AVG | LONG | TB | I–20 | 50+ | BLK | |
|---|---|---|---|---|---|---|---|---|---|---|---|
| 43 | Jack Wilson | 14 | 60 | 2432 | 40.53 | 56 | 1 | 20 | 16 | 5 | 0 |
| | TOTALS | 14 | 60 | 2432 | 40.43 | 56 | 1 | 19 | 16 | 5 | 0 |

Punt return statistics
| # | NAME | RET | YDS | AVG | TD | LONG |
|---|---|---|---|---|---|---|
| 6 | Coleman Owen | 16 | 130 | 8.13 | 1 | 61 |
| 23 | Tony Mathis | 1 | 0 | 0.00 | 0 | 0 |
| | TOTALS | 17 | 130 | 7.65 | 1 | 61 |

Kickoff return statistics
| # | NAME | RET | YDS | AVG | TD | LONG |
|---|---|---|---|---|---|---|
| 10 | Eamonn Dennis | 9 | 241 | 26.78 | 1 | 96 |
| 7 | Tank Pearson | 10 | 196 | 19.60 | 0 | 31 |
| 22 | Duncan Brune | 5 | 81 | 16.20 | 0 | 17 |
| 0 | Delaney Crawford | 1 | 16 | 16.00 | 0 | 16 |
| | TOTALS | 25 | 534 | 21.36 | 1 | 96 |

== Personnel ==
=== Coaching staff ===
Since July 14, 2021, the head coach of the Ohio Bobcats has been Tim Albin. He heads a staff of ten assistant coaches, four graduate assistants, a director of football operations, and numerous other support staff.

| Name | Position | Years at Ohio | Alma mater |
|---|---|---|---|
| Tim Albin | Head coach | 2005 | Northwestern Oklahoma State University 1989 |
| Brian Smith | Associate Head Coach/Offensive Coordinator/running backs | 2022 | University of Hawaii 2002 |
| John Hauser | Defensive Coordinator/Safeties | 2022 | Wittenberg University 2002 |
| Scott Isphording | Passing game coordinator/quarterbacks | 2014 | Hanover College 1994 |
| Nate Faanes | co-defensive coordinator/Special teams coordinator/linebackers | 2019 | Winona State University 2015 |
| DeAngelo Smith | Passing Game Coordinator/Cornerbacks/director of player development | 2017 | University of Cincinnati 2008 |
| Brian Metz | Recruiting Coordinator/Tight ends | 2020 | University of Notre Dame 2013 |
| Tremayne Scott | Def. Running Game Coordinator/Defensive tackles | 2018 | Ohio University 2012 |
| Allen Rudolph | Offensive line | 2019 | University of Southern Mississippi 1995 |
| Andre Allen | Wide receivers | 2023 | Ashford |
| Kurt Mattix | Defensive ends/Pass Rush Specialist | 2024 | Valparaiso University 1999 |
| Jeremiah Covington | Assistant athletic director for football operations | 2022 | Wingate University 2011 |
| Kyle Obly | Graduate assistant – offense | | |
| Jake Roney | Graduate assistant – offense | | |
| Garrett Pruss | Graduate assistant – defense | | |
| Nick Auriemma | Graduate assistant – defense | | |

=== Support staff ===
| Name | Position | Years at Ohio | Alma mater |
|---|---|---|---|
| Sarah Newgarde | Director of athletics administration and football communications | 2021 | Ohio University |
| Matthias Reiber | Head football athletic trainer | 2021 | Bowling Green State University |
| Jerry Lin | Staff Athletic trainer (football, swim & dive) | 2022 | University of South Carolina |
| Will Fife | Director of equipment | 2022 | Ohio University |
| Caleb Moon | Assistant director of equipment services | | |
| Thomas Turnbaugh | Director of video and recruiting services | 2018 | Ohio University |
| Clay Finney | Director of recruiting | 2023 | |
| Elaine Goodfellow | Administrative assistant | | |
| Jaydin Schrantz | Football operations assistant | 2024 | |
| Jessica Arquette | Ohio athletics sports dietitian | | Bowling Green State University |
| Kaitlyn Michener | Nutritionist | | |
| Hannah Rastatter | Nutritionist | | |
| Joseph Benish | Staff Athletic Trainer (Football/Track) | 2023 | Penn State University |
| Tyler Shumate | Director of Strength and Conditioning | 2024 | University of Virginia |
| Ben Gilkey | Assistant Strength and Conditioning Coach | | |
| John Bowman | Director of Sports Medicine & Athletics Health Care Administrator | 1994 | Ohio University |
| Dr. Sergio Ulloa | Team Orthopedic Physician | | Ohio University |
| Dr. Katherine Guran | Head Team Physician | | Northeast Ohio Medical University |
| James Odenthal | Staff Physical Therapist | 2010 | Ohio University |

=== Roster ===
2024 Ohio Bobcats football roster

Quarterback

- 4 Jacob Winters – R-Fr. 6'2" (233 lb.) Jackson, Ohio / Jackson
- 8 Nick Poulos - R-Jr. 6'6" (234 lb.) Granite Bay, Calif. / Granite Bay
- 9 Callum Wither – R-So. 6'4" (211 lb.) Mississauga, Ontario / Clarkson Football North
- 13 Parker Navarro – Gr. 6'1" (205 lb.) Tempe, Ariz. / Desert Vista
- 16 Matthew Papas – Fr. 5'11" (178 lb.) Grove City, Ohio / Grove City

Running Back

- 2 Anthony Tyus III – Gr. 6'1" (226 lb.) Portage, Mich. / Portage Northern
- 21 Nolan McCormick – R-Jr. 5'11" (226 lb.) Mason, Ohio / William Mason
- 22 Duncan Brune – Fr. 5'11" (210 lb.) Cologne, Germany / Cologne Crocodiles
- 28 Rickey Hunt Jr. – R-Fr. 5'11" (210 lb.) Oklahoma City, Okla. / Millwood
- 41 Devon Hunter – R-Jr. 5'11" (214 lb.) Avon, Ohio / Avon
- 48 Aginon Wilson Jr. – R-Fr. 5'10" (213 lb.) Cleveland, Ohio / Cleveland Heights

Wide Receiver

- 0 Delaney Crawford – R-So. - ( lb.) Fontana, CA / Corona Senior
- 3 Max Rodarte – Jr. 6'1" (191 lb.) Sacramento, California / Capital Christian
- 5 Khamani Debrow – R-Fr. 6'3" (201 lb.) Killeen, Texas / Ellison
- 6 Coleman Owen – Gr. 5'11" (191 lb.) Gilbert, Ariz. / Higley
- 7 Chase Hendricks – So. 6'1" (200 lb.) St. Louis, Mo. / St. Mary's
- 10 Eamonn Dennis – Gr. 5'11" (194 lb.) Worcester, Mass. / St. John's
- 11 Rodney Harris II – R-So. 6'2" (211 lb.) Cincinnati, Ohio / Princeton (Ohio)
- 12 Eian Pugh – R-So. 6'3" (184 lb.) Oak Park, Ill. / Fenwick
- 17 Kaden Hurst – Fr. 6'1" (195 lb.) Fort Wayne, Indiana / Leo
- 18 Miles Cremascoli – Fr. 6'3" (223 lb.) Winnetka, Ill. / New Trier
- 19 Dom Dorwart – Fr. 6'2" (200 lb.) Leonardtown, Md. / St. Mary's Ryken
- 20 Jack Borer – R-Fr. 6'2" (203 lb.) Perrysburg, Ohio / Perrysburg
- 23 Riley Neer – Fr. 5'11" (180 lb.) Bellefontaine, Ohio / Bellefontaine
- 37 Blake Guffey – R-So. 6'1" (219 lb.) Glouster, Ohio / Trimble
- 80 Ryan McDole – R-So. 6'4" (211 lb.) Cincinnati, Ohio / Turpin
- 81 Matthew Stuewe – R-Fr. 6'2" (198 lb.) Avon Lake, Ohio / Avon Lake
- 83 Hunter Thompson – Fr. 6'3" (215 lb.) Adamstown, Md. / Oakdale
- 88 Caleb Gossett – R-Jr. 6'2" (200 lb.) Lewis Center, Ohio / Olentangy

Tight End

- 14 Bryce Butler – R-Jr. 6'2" (248 lb.) Bowie, Md. / St. John's College High School
- 40 Beau Blankenship – R-So. 6'4" (240 lb.) Hillsboro, Ohio / Paint Valley
- 44 Aiden Lowery – Fr. 6'3" (204 lb.) Dublin Ohio / Dublin Jerome
- 82 Nick Segarra – Fr. 6'6" (257 lb.) Charlotte, N.C. / Charlotte Catholic
- 84 AJ Miller – Fr. 6'4" (226 lb.) Pickerington, Ohio / Pickerington North
- 85 Mason Williams – R-Fr. 6'5" (257 lb.) Mogadore, Ohio / Mogadore
- 86 Jake Bruno – R-Jr. 6'6" (249 lb.) Amherst, N.Y. / Saint Francis

Offensive lineman

- 51 Davion Weatherspoon – R-Jr. 6'1" (311 lb.) Harper Woods, Mich. / Harper Woods High School
- 53 Andrew Erby – Fr. 6'3" (261 lb.) Harrisburg, Pa. / Steelton
- 54 Charlie Nowinsky – Fr. 6'5" (324 lb.) Wittenberg, Wis. / Wittenberg-Birnamwood
- 55 Jordon Jones – R-So. 6'3" (297 lb.) Ashland, Ky. / Paul G. Blazer
- 56 Ben Maldonado – Jr. 6'4" (294 lb.) Miami, Fla. / Champagnat Catholic School
- 57 Carson Heidecker – R-Sr. 6'3" (295 lb.) Columbia Station, Ohio / Columbia
- 60 Trent Allen – Jr. 6'3" (284 lb.) Windemere, Fla. / Bishop Moore
- 61 Kaden Rogers – R-Jr. 6'3" (297 lb.) Hamilton, Ohio / Ross High School
- 64 Seth Anstead – Fr. 6'4" (289 lb.) Chelsea, Mich. / Chelsea
- 65 Jake Skelly – R-Jr. 6'4" (276 lb.) Columbus, Ohio / Bishop Harley High School
- 66 Christophe Atkinson – Gr. 6'4" (308 lb.) Leesburg, Va. / Tuscarora
- 67 Kam Wright – R-So. 6'4" (321 lb.) Granville, Ohio / Granville
- 69 Parker Titsworth – Gr. 6'1" (290 lb.) Wexford, Pa. / North Allegheny
- 70 Brennan Meadows – Fr. - ( lb.) Coal Grove, Ohio / Dawson-Bryant
- 71 Aidan Johnson – R-Fr. 6'3" (304 lb.) Elkridge, Maryland / Good Counsel
- 72 Jakob Lemus – R-Jr. - ( lb.) Oxnard, Calif. / Hueneme
- 73 Joseph Habinowski – R-Sr. 6'5" (317 lb.) Fort Lauderdale, Fla. / Chaminade-Madonna College Preparatory
- 74 Tigana Cisse – Jr. 6'3" (300 lb.) Oakland, Calif. / McClymonds
- 75 Jarian Shelby – R-So. 6'3" (283 lb.) Luling, La. / Hahnville High School
- 76 Bryce Parson – Fr. 6'2" (291 lb.) Saint Louis, Mo. / Christian Brothers College
- 77 Jacob Dennison – R-Sr. 6'5" (299 lb.) Mansfield, Ohio / Lexington

Placekicker

- 44 Gianni Spetic – So. 6'3" (211 lb.) Chardon, Ohio / Notre Dame Cathedral Latin
- 46 Jacob Lewis – Gr. 6'3" (227 lb.) Delaware, Ohio / Olentangy Berlin
- 47 Alex Kasee – So. 6'2" (175 lb.) Sylvania, Ohio / Sylvania Northview

Defensive line

- 8 Ben McNaboe – Gr. 6'3" (250 lb.) Rogers, Minn. / Rogers
- 10 Cam Rice – Gr. 6'3" (290 lb.) Morgantown, W.Va / Morgantown
- 11 CJ Doggette – R-So. 6'2" (277 lb.) Pickerington, Ohio / Pickerington Central
- 13 Kaci Seegars – R-Jr. 6'2" (255 lb.) Charlotte, N.C. / Audrey Kell
- 16 Chris Mayfield – R-Sr. 6'3" (275 lb.) Hilliard, Ohio / Hilliard Bradley
- 17 Marcel Walker-Burgess – Gr. 6'2" (252 lb.) Piscataway, N.J. / Piscataway
- 19 Kadin Schmitz – So. 6'1" (237 lb.) Ashland, Ohio / Ashland
- 50 Owen DiFranco – R-Fr. 6'4" (251 lb.) Glen Ellyn, Ill. / Glenbard South
- 51 Maverick Ohle – Fr. 6'3" (255 lb.) Naperville, Ill. / Naperville Central
- 57 Nathan Hale – Jr. 6'4" (281 lb.) Wichita, Kan. / Northwest
- 81 Bralen Henderson – R-Jr. 6'2" (280 lb.) Pittsburgh, Pa. / Central Catholic
- 90 Brock Arndt – Fr. 6'4" (248 lb.) Appleton, Wis. / Appleton North
- 91 Jay Crable – R-Fr. 6'3" (227 lb.) Massillon, Ohio / Archbishop
- 92 RJ Keuchler – R-Fr. 6'5" (266 lb.) Pickerington, Ohio / Pickerington Central
- 93 Sam Ehret – Fr. 6'4" (246 lb.) Clearwater, Fla / Clearwater Academy International
- 94 Bradley Weaver – R-Jr. 6'4" (262 lb.) Hilliard, Ohio / Hilliard Darby High School
- 95 Walter Bob – Jr. - ( lb.) Lafayette, La. / Acadiana
- 96 Sinn Brennan – R-Fr. 6'4" (235 lb.) Osaka, Japan / Los Alamitos (Calif.)
- 97 Austin Mitchell – R-Fr. 6'2" (267 lb.) Avon, Ohio / Avon
- 98 Danny Novickas – R-Fr. 6'3" (231 lb.) Chicago, Ill. / Mt. Carmel
- 99 Joey Woolard – R-Sr. 6'1" (278 lb.) Grove City, Ohio / Grove City

Linebacker

- 9 Blake Leake – Gr. 6'2" (215 lb.) Culpeper, Va. / Eastern View
- 15 Reise Collier – 5th 6'3" (213 lb.) Midwest City, Okla. / Carl Albert High School
- 25 Michael Molnar – R-So. 6'3" (221 lb.) Mason, Ohio / Mason
- 27 Jack Fries – R-So. 6'2" (215 lb.) Cincinnati, Ohio / LaSalle
- 30 Stellan Bowman – Fr. 6'1" (226 lb.) Grand Rapids, Michigan / East Kenwood
- 33 Brady Sestili – R-Fr. 6'4" (205 lb.) Delaware, Ohio / Dublin Jerome
- 34 Lukas Stiles – R-Fr. 5'9" (225 lb.) Wadsworth, Ohio / Highland
- 35 Shay Taylor – R-Jr. 6'3" (232 lb.) Mount Perry, Ohio / Sheridan High School
- 36 Parker Startz – Fr. 6'3" (240 lb.) Chicago, Ill. / Mount Carmel
- 56 Ryan Matheny – Fr. - ( lb.) Fairfax Station, Va. / Lake Baddock Secondary

Defensive back

- 0 Austin Brawley – Jr. 6'1" (180 lb.) Massillon, Ohio / Massillon Washington
- 2 Miles Fleming – R-Sr. 5'11" (197 lb.) Columbus, Ohio / Bishop Hartley
- 3 Jeremiah Wood – Gr. 6'1" (216 lb.) Pickerington, Ohio / Pickerington Central
- 4 Roman Parodie – R-Sr. 6'2" (204 lb.) Fort Lauderdale, Fla. / Cardinal Gibbons
- 5 Adonis Williams Jr. – Jr. 6'2" (217 lb.) South Euclid, Ohio / Cleveland Heights
- 6 Dustin Johnson – Gr. 6'1" (201 lb.) Denver, Co. / Cherry Cree
- 7 Tank Pearson – Sr. 5'9" (178 lb.) Oxford, Miss. / Oxford
- 12 Mike Mack – R-Jr. 6'1" (199 lb.) Glenn Dale, Md. / Bullis School
- 14 Xander Karagosian – R-So. 6'1" (206 lb.) Jackson, Ohio / Alexander and Jackson
- 18 Bailey Russ – R-Jr. 6'2" (212 lb.) Cuyahoga Falls, Ohio / Walsh Jesuit
- 20 Kendall Bannister – R-Fr. 5'11" (183 lb.) Woodbridge, Va. / Freedom
- 21 DJ Walker – R-Fr. 6'1" (186 lb.) Aliquippa, Pa. / Aliquippa
- 22 Jalen Thomeson – So. 5'11" (187 lb.) Greenwood, Ind. / Center Grove
- 23 Tony Mathis – Fr. 5'11" (176 lb.) Macon, Ga. / Westside
- 24 DJ Morton – Fr. 6'1" (181 lb.) Indianapolis, Ind. / Lawrence Central
- 26 LJ Shumpert – Jr. 5'11" (175 lb.) Booneville, Miss. / Booneville
- 28 Jaylen Johnson – R-Jr. 6'2" (221 lb.) Cincinnati, Ohio / Lasalle
- 29 JT Haskins – Fr. 5'11" (172 lb.) Lexington, Ky. / Bryant Station
- 38 Andrew Vera – So. 5'11" (190 lb.) St. Clairsville, Ohio / St. Clairsville
- 41 Creed Hill – R-Fr. 5'10" (179 lb.) Medina, Ohio / Highland
- 42 Carson Canning – Fr. 5'10" (189 lb.) Avon, Ohio / Avon
- 49 Xavier Williams – Fr. - ( lb.) Akron, Ohio / Archbishop Hoban

Punter

- 43 Jack Wilson – R-Sr. 5'11" (222 lb.) Lancefield, Victoria, Australia / Gisborne Secondary College (ProKick Australia)

Long Snapper

- 38 Dominic Konopka – R-So. 5'11" (248 lb.) Sharon Center, Ohio / Highland
- 39 Colby Garfield – Gr. 6'2" (234 lb.) Clemmons, N.C. / North Davidson

As of August 25, 2024 - Source:

=== Depth chart ===
Defense

FS
Adonis Williams Jr.
Miles Fleming
Jaylen Johnson

| NICKEL | WILL | MIKE |
|---|---|---|
| DJ Walker | Blake Leake | Shay Taylor |
| Mike Mack | Michael Molnar | Stellan Bowman |
| - | - | Jack Fries |

SS
Dustin Johnson
Miles Fleming
-

CB
Tank Pearson
Tony Mathis
-

| DE | DT | DT | DE |
|---|---|---|---|
| Bradley Weaver | CJ Doggette | Bralen Henderson | Ben McNaboe |
| Kaci Seegars | Chris Mayfield | Cam Rice | Kadin Schmitz |
| - | - | - | Marcel Walker-Burgess |

CB
Roman Parodie
Mike Mack
Tony Mathis

Offense

WR-F
Chase Hendricks
Max Rodarte
Kaden Hurst

WR-X
Coleman Owen
Eamonn Dennis
Caleb Gossett

| LT | LG | C | RG | RT |
|---|---|---|---|---|
| Carson Heidecker | Davion Weatherspoon | Parker Titsworth | Christophe Atkinson | Jacob Dennison |
| Jordon Jones | Trent Allen | Kam Wright | Aidan Johnson | Jarian Shelby |
| - | - | - | - | - |

TE
Mason Williams
Jake Bruno
Bryce Butler

WR-Z
Rodney Harris II
Eian Pugh
-

QB
Parker Navarro
Nick Poulos
-

RB
Anthony Tyus III
Rickey Hunt Jr
Nolan McCormick

Special teams
PK Gianni Spetic
Jacob Lewis
Alex Kasee
P Jack Wilson
Alex Kasee
KR Tank Pearson
Eamonn Dennis
Duncan Brune
PR Coleman Owen
Tank Pearson
LS Golby Garfield
Dominic Konopka

Starters out for the season: SS:Austin Brawley; Nickel:Jeremiah Wood

For December 20, 2024 vs. Jacksonville State - Source:

== Awards and honors ==
=== Weekly awards ===
| Award | Player | Position | Year | Date | Source |
|---|---|---|---|---|---|
| MAC Offensive Player of the Week | Parker Navarro | QB | GS | Sept. 30 | |
| MAC Offensive Player of the Week | Coleman Owen | WR | GS | Oct. 28 | |
| MAC Defensive Player of the Week | Shay Taylor | LB | R-Jr. | Oct. 28 | |
| MAC Special Teams Player of the Week | Eamonn Dennis | WR/KR | GS | Nov. 8 | |
| MAC Offensive Player of the Week | Parker Navarro | QB | GS | Nov. 15 | |
| MAC Offensive Player of the Week | Parker Navarro | QB | GS | Nov. 25 | |
| MAC Offensive Player of the Week | Parker Navarro | QB | GS | Dec. 2 | |
| MAC Championship Game Offensive Player of the Game | Parker Navarro | QB | GS | Dec. 7 | |
| MAC Championship Game Defensive Player of the Game | Bradley Weaver | DE | Jr. | Dec. 7 | |
| MAC Championship Game Special Teams Player of the Game | Gianni Spetic | K | So. | Dec. 7 | |
| Cure Bowl MVP | Parker Navarro | QB | GS | Dec. 21 | |

=== Award Finalists ===
| Award | Player | Position | Year |
|---|---|---|---|
| Ted Hendricks Award | Bradley Weaver | DE | R-Jr. |

=== All-MAC awards ===
Postseason All-MAC teams
| Award | Player | Position | Year |
|---|---|---|---|
| MAC Coach of the Year | Tim Albin | Head Coach | |
| All-MAC First Team Offense | Coleman Owen | Wide Receiver | GS |
| All-MAC First Team Defense | Bradley Weaver | Defensive Line | R-Jr. |
| All-MAC Second Team Offense | Parker Navarro | Quarterback | GS |
| All-MAC Second Team Offense | Parker Titsworth | Offensive Line | GS |
| All-MAC Second Team Offense | Carson Heidecker | Offensive Line | R-Sr. |
| All-MAC Second Team Offense | Anthony Tyus III | Running Back | GS |
| All-MAC Second Team Defense | DJ Walker | Defensive Back | R-Fr. |
| All-MAC Third Team Defense | Shay Taylor | Linebacker | R-Jr. |
| All-MAC Third Team Defense | Blake Leake | Linebacker | GS |

=== National awards ===
National Award Honors
| Honors | Player | Position | Ref. |
|---|---|---|---|
| FWAA First Team Freshman All-American | Mason Williams | TE | |

== Rankings ==
Ranking movements Legend: ██ Increase in ranking ██ Decrease in ranking — = Not ranked RV = Received votes
| | Week | | | | | | | | | | | | | | | | |
| Poll | Pre | 1 | 2 | 3 | 4 | 5 | 6 | 7 | 8 | 9 | 10 | 11 | 12 | 13 | 14 | 15 | Final |
|---|---|---|---|---|---|---|---|---|---|---|---|---|---|---|---|---|---|
| AP | — | — | — | — | — | — | — | — | — | — | — | — | — | — | — | RV | RV |
| Coaches | — | — | — | — | — | — | — | — | — | — | — | — | — | — | — | RV | RV |
| CFP | Not released | | | | | | | | | | | — | — | — | — | — | Not released |

AP -

Coaches -

CFP -
