= Isphording =

Isphording is a surname. Notable people with the surname include:

- Julie Isphording (born 1961), American long-distance runner
- Scott Isphording (born 1971), American football player and coach
