= Scott Isphording =

American football player and coach (born 1971)

Current position
- Title: Offensive coordinator and quarterbacks coach
- Team: Ohio
- Conference: Mid-American

Biographical details
- Born: September 2, 1971 (age 55); Cincinnati, Ohio, US
- Education: Hanover College (BA); Fort Hays State University (MS)

Playing career
- 1990–1993: Hanover
- Position: Quarterback

Coaching career (HC unless noted)

Football
- 1994–1996: Fort Hays State (QB)
- 1996–1998: Colorado Mines (QB/WR)
- 1998–2003: Wittenberg (OC/QB)
- 2004–2006: Eastern Michigan (QB)
- 2007–2008: Eastern Michigan (OC)
- 2009: Ohio (TE/RC)
- 2010–2011: Toledo (QB)
- 2012–2013: Toledo (QB/PGC/RC)
- 2014–2020: Ohio (QB)
- 2021–2024: Ohio (co-OC/QB)
- 2024–2025: Ohio (PGC/QB)
- 2025–present: Ohio (OC/QB)

Golf
- 2002–2003: Wittenberg

Baseball
- 1998–2002: Wittenberg (asst.)

Scott R. Isphording (born September 2, 1971) is an American college football coach and former player. He currently serves as the offensive coordinator and quarterbacks coach for the Ohio Bobcats.

== Playing career ==
Isphording was a four-year letterwinner as a quarterback at Hanover College in Hanover, Indiana, playing from 1990 to 1993. He finished the 1992 season with 3,098 yards of passing, which stood as sixth-most in NCAA Division III history.

== Coaching career ==
Isphording began his coaching career as a graduate student at Fort Hays State University in Hays, Kansas, serving as the Tigers' quarterbacks coach from 1994 to 1996. After leaving Fort Hays State, he was the quarterbacks and wide receivers coach at the Colorado School of Mines for three years. Isphording spent the following six years, from 1998 to 2003, on the staff at Wittenberg University as an offensive coordinator and quarterbacks coach, in addition to serving as the head men's golf coach in his final year there. From 1998 to 2002, he also served as an assistant coach on the Wittenberg baseball staff.

He took his first Division I job in 2004 when he was hired as the quarterbacks coach on Jeff Genyk's staff at Eastern Michigan University. After three years in this position, Isphording was promoted to offensive coordinator. In 2009, Isphording departed Eastern Michigan for Ohio University, where he served as the Bobcats' tight ends coach and recruiting coordinator for one year. Isphording then accepted a position as the quarterbacks coach at Toledo University; he held this position for two years before adding the roles of passing game coordinator and recruiting coordinator for his final two years.

Before the 2014 season, Isphording returned to Ohio to take the position of quarterbacks coach. He held this position for seven seasons before being promoted to co-offensive coordinator alongside Allen Rudolph, after Tim Albin was promoted to head coach upon the retirement of Frank Solich, while still holding his previous position. During a ten win 2022 season his offense was ranked number one in the MAC and quarterback Kurtis Rourke was named MAC Player of the Year. Prior or the 2024 season he and new offensive coordinator Brian Smith swapped positions and he took over as passing game coordinator. After Smith was promoted to head coach for the 2025 season, he resumed the role of offensive coordinator.

== Personal life ==
Isphording is from Cincinnati, Ohio, and attended La Salle High School. He holds a Bachelor of Arts from Hanover College and a Master of Science in physical education from Fort Hays State University. He is married to his wife, Shelly, with whom he has two children.
