= Brian Metz =

American football coach

Brian Metz is an American football coach. He is currently the tight ends coach and recruiting coordinator for the Charlotte 49ers. Previously the tight ends coach for the Ohio Bobcats, a position he had held since February 2020. Prior to being named to Frank Solich's staff, Metz served as a graduate assistant or coaching intern at UNLV, Ohio University, and the University of Memphis.

== Coaching career ==
Metz began his career in college football as a student equipment manager with the University of Notre Dame football program. He then coached at Saint Joseph High School (South Bend, IN) while still enrolled in undergrad. After graduating from Notre Dame, Metz joined the Ohio University football program working as a recruiting and quarterbacks intern during the 2013-2014 seasons. In 2015, Metz was hired by Justin Fuente at the University of Memphis as wide receivers intern. In 2016, Frank Solich hired Metz back to Athens, OH as the wide receivers graduate assistant. And in 2019, Metz joined the UNLV football program under Tony Sanchez as quarterbacks graduate assistant. In 2020 he was hired to coach the tight ends at Ohio University. In December 2021, Metz was named to the American Football Coaches Association "35 Under 35" Leadership Institution. In 2023, Ohio football head coach Tim Albin promoted Metz to Recruiting Coordinator.

== Personal life ==
Metz is a native of Knoxville, Tennessee and is a 2009 graduate of Knoxville Catholic High School. A 2013 graduate of the University of Notre Dame, Metz earned his MBA (2015), Master of Sports Administration (2015), and Master of Coaching Education (2018) degrees from Ohio University. Metz met his wife, Lindsae, who is also an Ohio MBA/MSA graduate, while in Athens.
