= Allen Rudolph =

American football player and coach (born 1971)

Current position
- Title: Offensive line coach & run game coordinator
- Team: Charlotte
- Conference: American

Biographical details
- Born: February 10, 1971 (age 55); Jackson, Mississippi, U.S.
- Education: University of Southern Mississippi

Playing career
- 1989–1993: Nicholls State

Coaching career (HC unless noted)
- 1995–1998: Nicholls State (OL/TE/RB/ST)
- 1999: Copiah–Lincoln (OC/OL)
- 2000–2001: Mississippi College (OL)
- 2002–2003: Louisiana–Monroe (OL)
- 2004: East Mississippi (OL)
- 2005–2006: Samford (OC/OL)
- 2007–2011: Southeastern Louisiana (OL/OC)
- 2012: Northwestern State (OL)
- 2013–2015: Hamilton Tiger-Cats (OL)
- 2016–2018: Arkansas State (OL)
- 2019–2020: Ohio (OL)
- 2021–2023: Ohio (co-OC/OL)
- 2024: Ohio (OL)
- 2025–present: Charlotte (OL/RGC)

Allen Rudolph (born February 10, 1971) is an American football coach and former football player. He is currently the offensive line coach and run game coordinator at Charlotte.

== Playing career ==
Rudolph is an alumnus of the University of Southern Mississippi, but played college football at Nicholls State University.

== Coaching career ==
Rudolph's first coaching job was at Nicholls State, where he coached offensive line and tight ends from 1995 to 1997 and running backs and special teams in 1998. He coached offensive line for one season at Copiah-Lincoln Community College in 1999 before becoming offensive line coach at Mississippi College from 2000 to 2001. Rudolph then coached offensive line at the University of Louisiana at Monroe from 2002 to 2003 then spent one year coaching offensive line at East Mississippi Community College in 2004. He then moved on to Samford University where he was offensive coordinator and offensive line coach from 2005 to 2006. Rudolph then moved on to Southeastern Louisiana University as offensive line coach from 2007 to 2009 and offensive coordinator from 2010 to 2011. In 2012, he was named offensive line coach at Northwestern State University.

In 2013, Rudolph became offensive line coach for the Hamilton Tiger-Cats of the Canadian Football League (CFL) and served in that position through the 2015 season. On January 28, 2016, he accepted the position of offensive line coach at Arkansas State University for three seasons from 2016 to 2018. On February 28, 2019, Rudolph was named offensive line coach at Ohio University for the 2019 season. Following Tim Albin's promotion to head coach, Rudolph was promoted to co-offensive coordinator in August 2021. Prior or the 2024 season, Brian Smith took over as offensive coordinator and he retained his other roles.
