= Southern Crescent Stadium =

High school sports stadium in Georgia, US

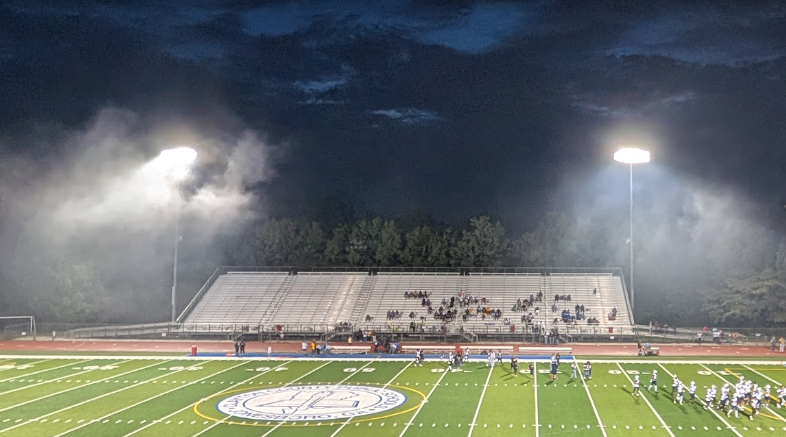
- View of visitors' side.
- Interactive map of Southern Crescent Stadium
- Address: 6231 Garden Walk Blvd; Riverdale, Georgia; United States
- Coordinates: 33°35′27″N 84°24′1″W
- Owner: Clayton County Public Schools
- Operator: Clayton County Public Schools
- Capacity: 6,600
- Surface: Field turf

Construction
- Opened: 2009

Tenant
- Clayton County Public Schools

Southern Crescent Stadium is a 6,600 seat stadium in Riverdale, Georgia, United States. It was built in 2009 and is a shared home stadium for Clayton County Public Schools. It is the third oldest of the four stadiums in Clayton County; the other stadiums are Hines Ward Field at Tara Stadium, Twelve Oaks Stadium and Steele Road Stadium.

== History ==
Southern Crescent Stadium opened in 2009 at a cost of $16 million. It was built along with Charles Drew High School.
