= Hines Ward Field at Tara Stadium =

High school sports stadium in Georgia, US

- Tara Stadium
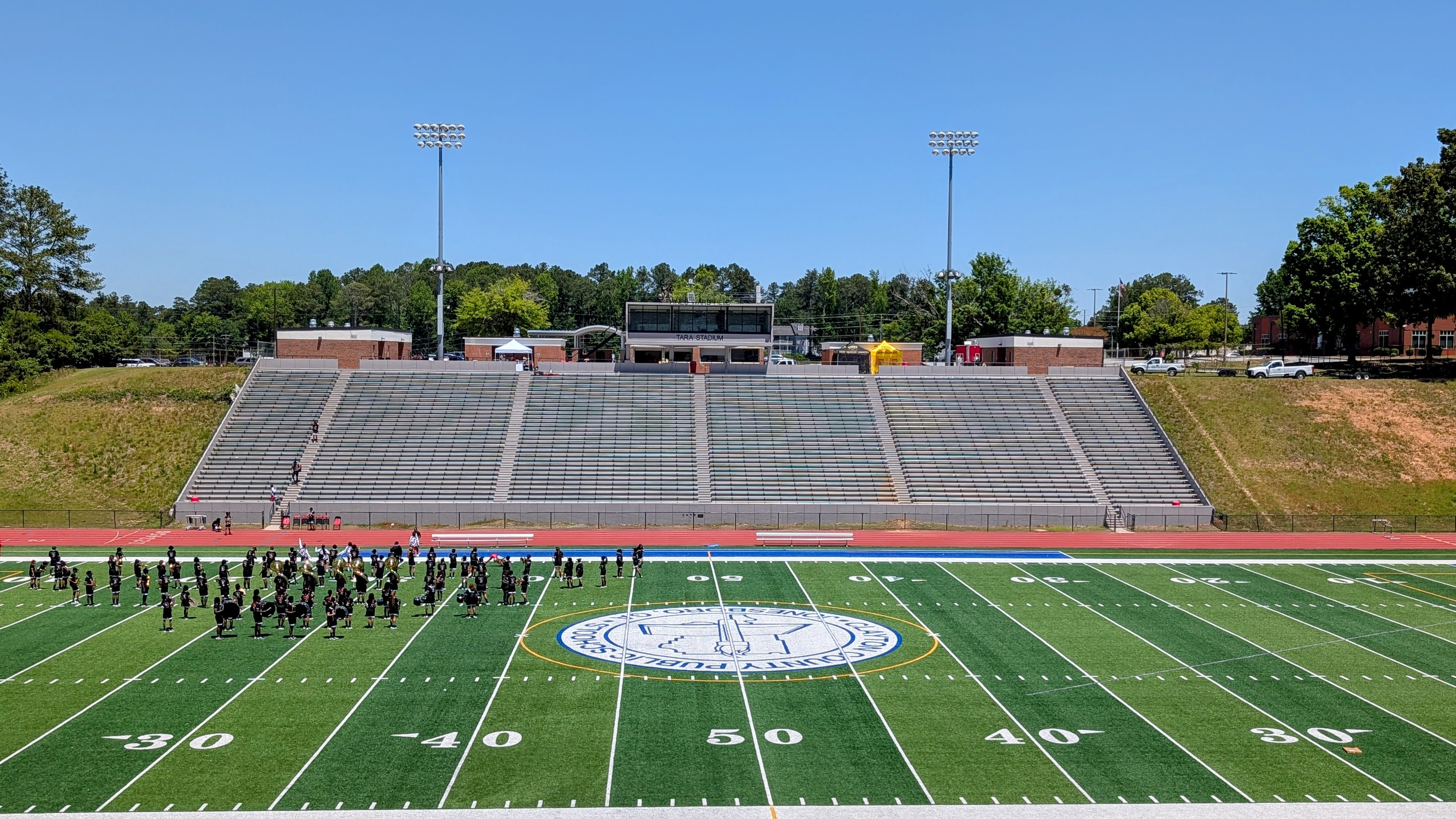
- Interactive map of Hines Ward Field at Tara Stadium
- Location: 1055 Battle Creek Rd, Jonesboro, Georgia
- Coordinates: 33.551°N 84.357°W
- Owner: Clayton County Public Schools
- Operator: Clayton County Public Schools
- Capacity: 10,000
- Surface: Field turf

Construction
- Opened: 1968

Tenant
- Clayton County Public Schools

Tara Stadium is a 10,000 seat stadium located in Jonesboro, Georgia. Built in 1968, it is a shared home stadium for Clayton County Public Schools. It is the oldest of the four stadiums in Clayton County, the other being Twelve Oaks Stadium, Southern Crescent Stadium and Steele Road Stadium. In 2022, the field was renamed after local Forest Park high school's star football player, Hines Ward.

== History ==
Tara Stadium opened in 1968 at a cost of more than $500,000.

== Renovations ==
Throughout 2024 and 2025, the stadium underwent renovations to upgrade the concessions and entrances, with the addition of a new field house and a large display scoreboard.

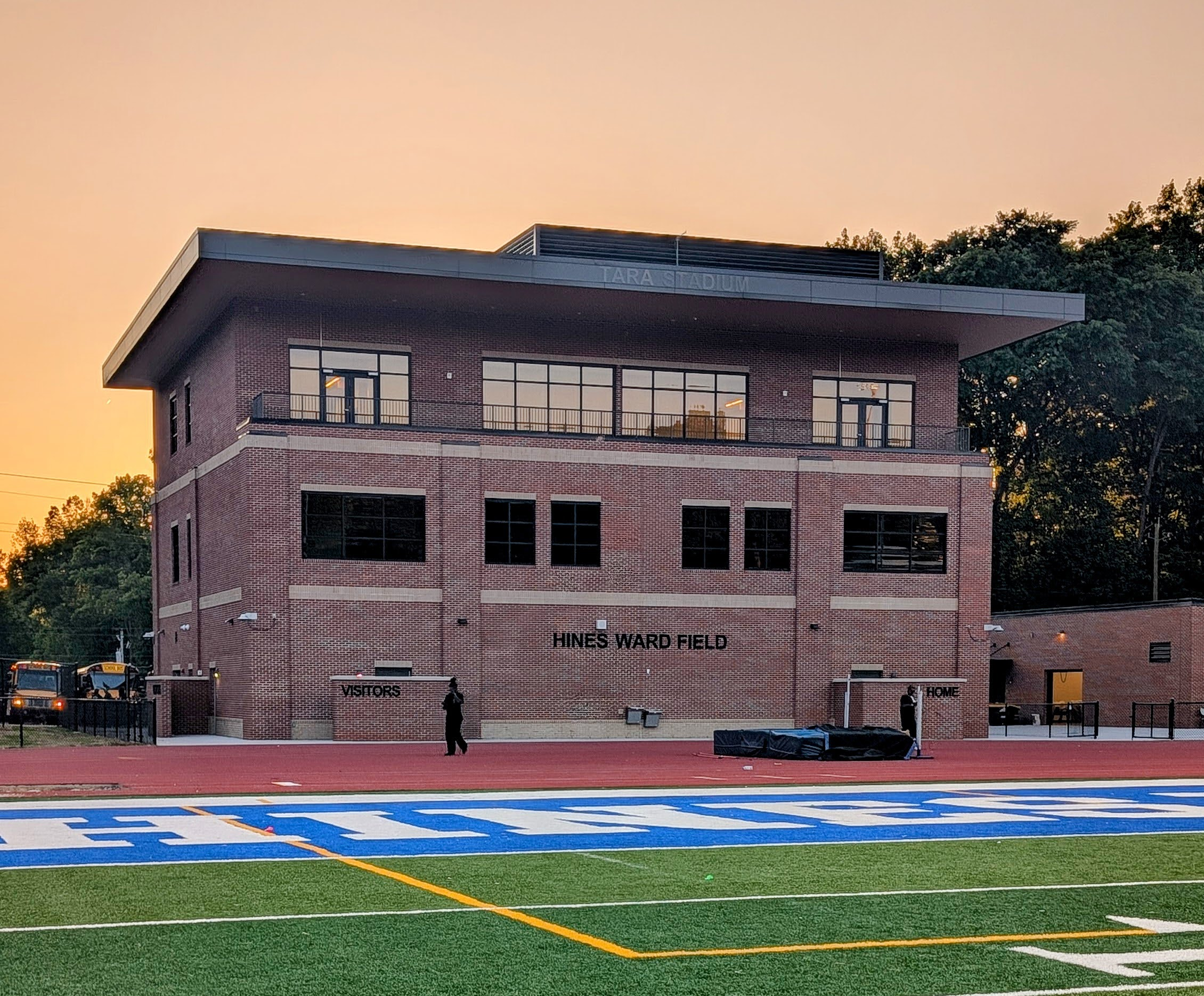
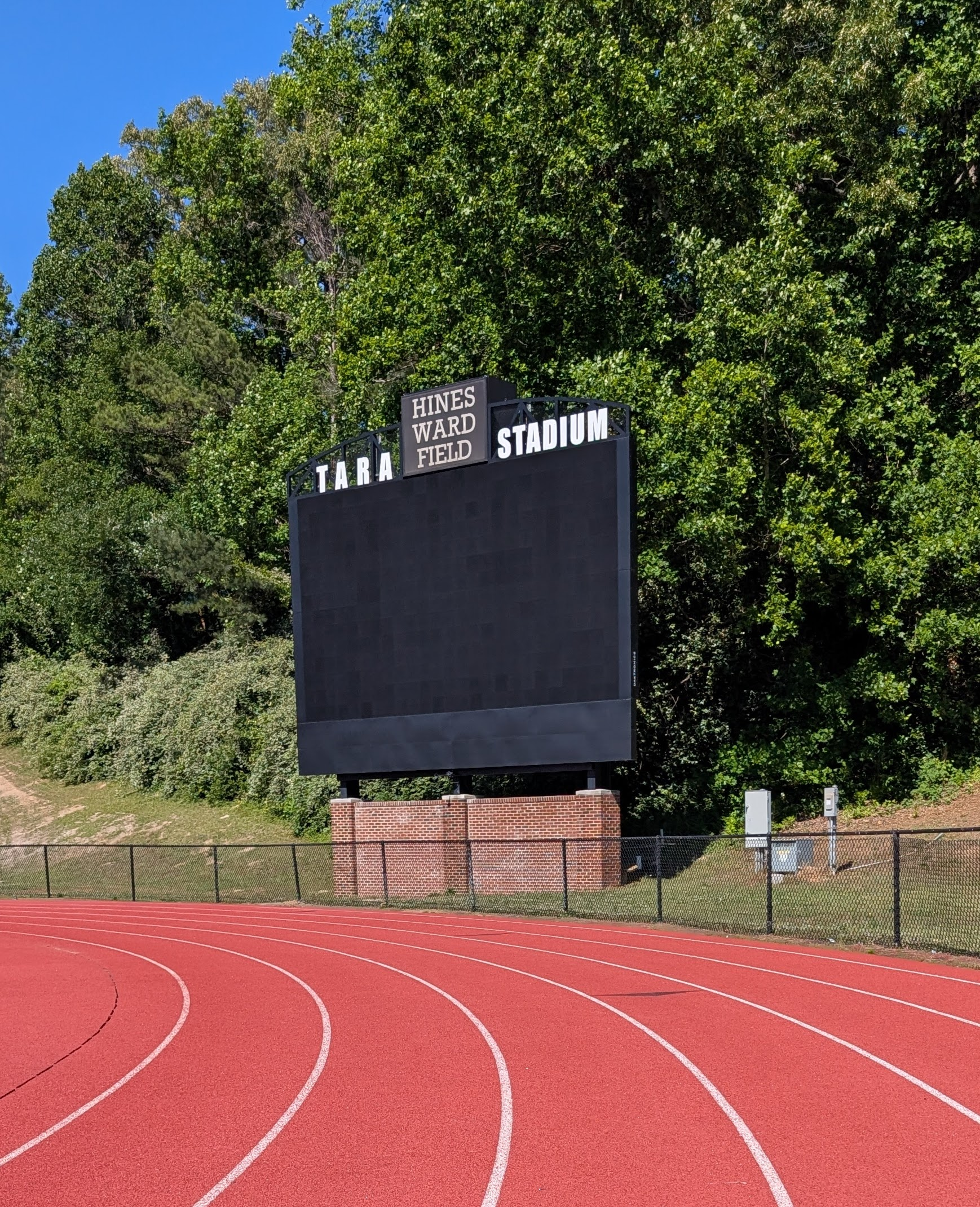
The new field house and scoreboard.
