= Terrence Woodyard =

Spanish-born American basketball player

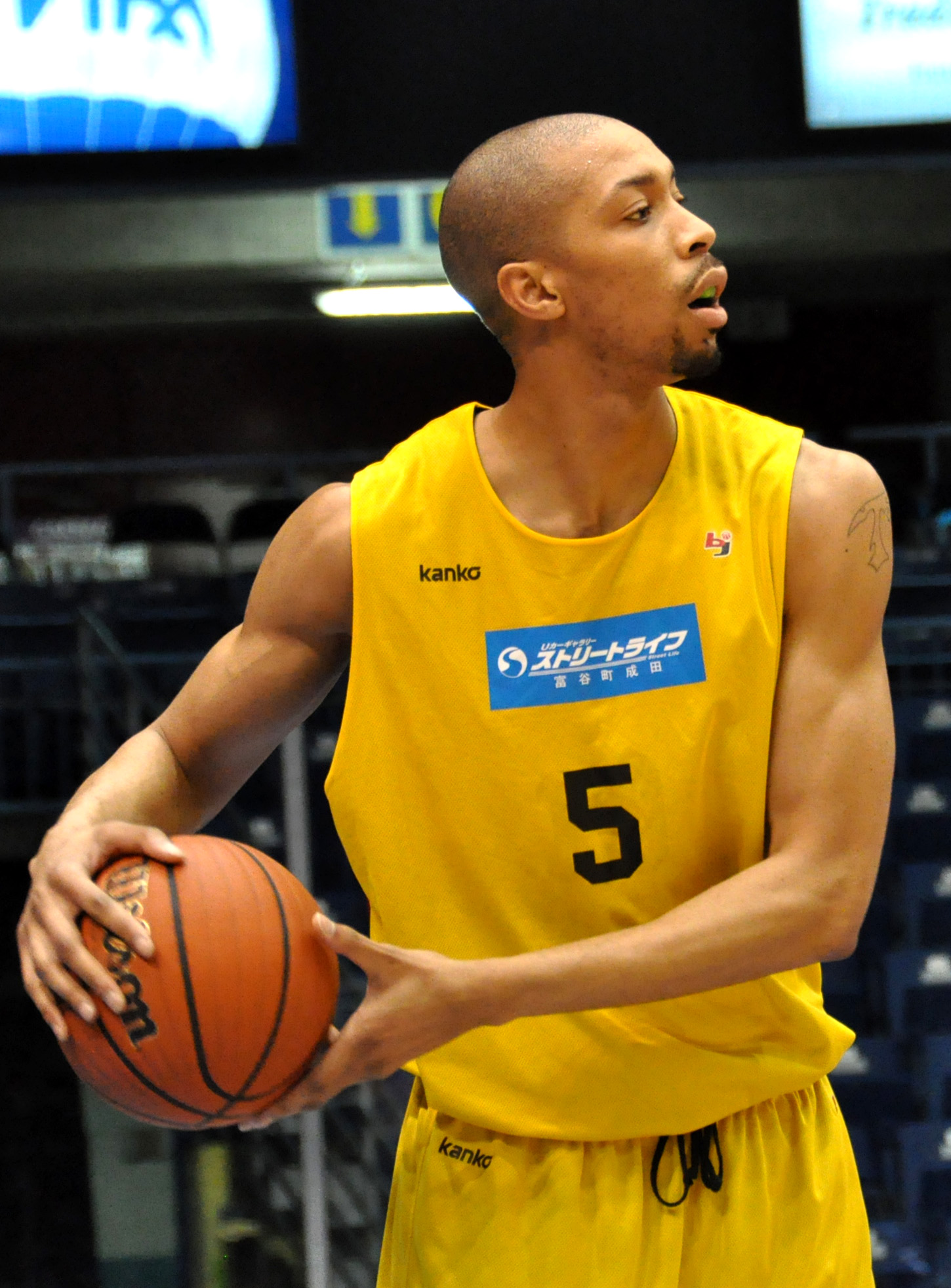
- Woodyard in 2011

Personal information
- Born: December 26, 1982 (age 43) Madrid, Spain
- Listed height: 6 ft 9 in (2.06 m)
- Listed weight: 205 lb (93 kg)

Career information
- High school: Mount Zion (Jonesboro, Georgia)
- College: Western Carolina (2001–2005)
- NBA draft: 2005: undrafted
- Playing career: 2005–2013
- Position: Forward

Career history
- 2005: Atlanta Vision
- 2006: Georgia Gwizzlies
- 2006: Anderson Heat
- 2007: Seattle Mountaineers
- 2007–2008: Leicester Riders
- 2008–2009: Toyama Grouses
- 2009–2010: Saitama Broncos
- 2010–2011: Sendai 89ers
- 2011: Saint John Mill Rats
- 2011–2012: Moncton Miracles
- 2012–2013: DFW Stars

Terrence Arnold Woodyard (born December 26, 1982) is an American former professional basketball player.

== Early life and college ==
Born in Madrid, Spain, Woodyard graduated from Mount Zion High School and played college basketball at Western Carolina University from 2001 to 2005, where he was roommates with future Houston Rockets guard Kevin Martin. In four seasons, Woodyard played 107 games and averaged 3.8 points, 2.1 rebounds, and 0.6 assists per game. He made 45.2% of shots from the field.

== Career ==
=== Atlanta Vision (2005) ===
Woodyard began his career with the Atlanta Vision of the American Basketball Association.

=== Seattle Mountaineers (2007) ===
On December 13, 2006, Woodyard signed with the Seattle Mountaineers of the International Basketball League.

=== Leicester Riders (2007–2008) ===
On September 14, 2007, Woodward and former Western Carolina teammate Kyle Greathouse signed with the Leicester Riders of the British Basketball League. Woodyard has been a leading scorer; on December 16, he tied with Rod Wellington to score 22 points to help Leicester beat the London Capital 97–82.

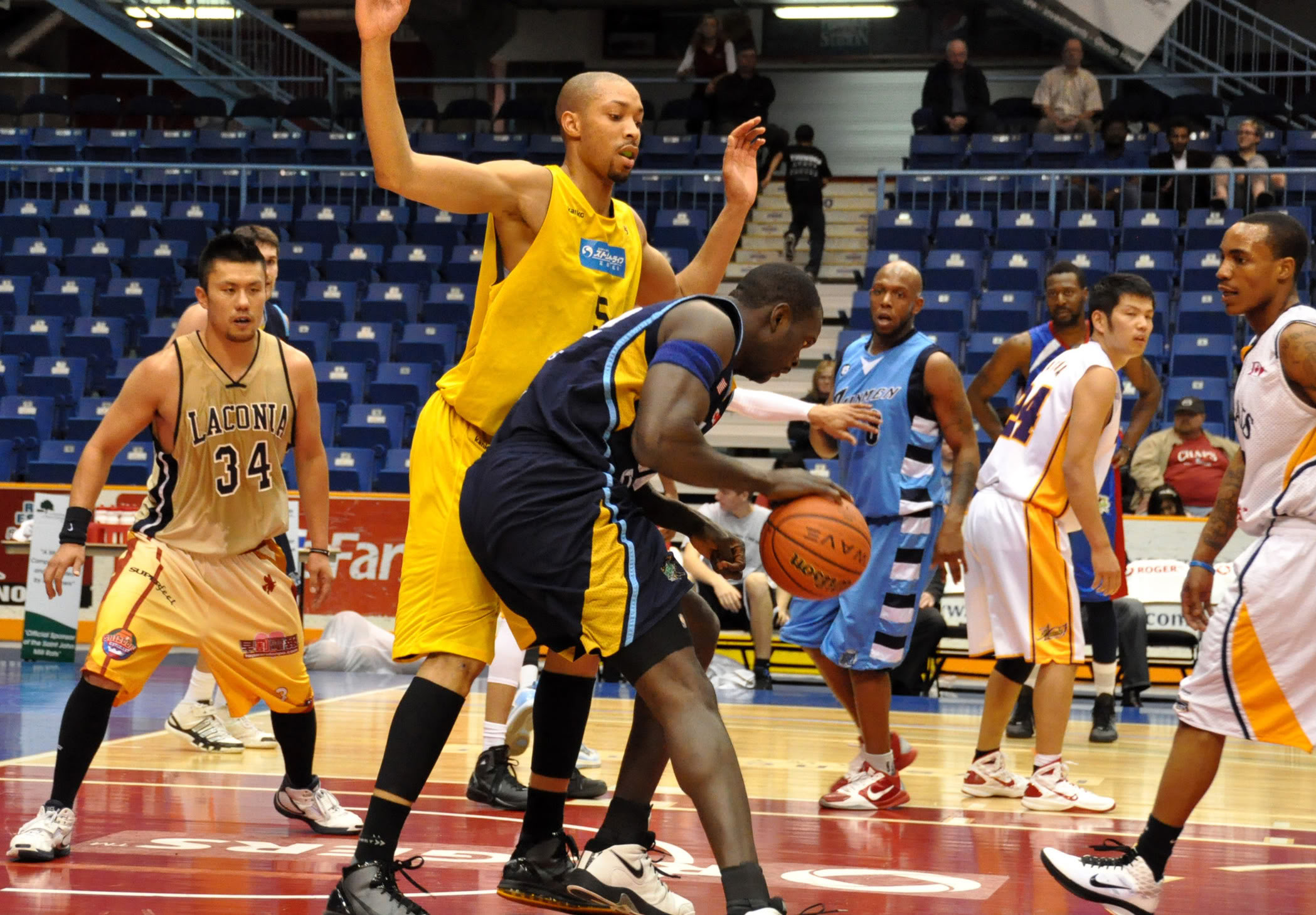
Playing in Saint John, Canada

=== Basketball Japan League (2008–2011) ===
After his season with the Leicester Riders, Woodyard signed with the Toyama Grouses of the Basketball Japan League in October 2008. With the Saitama Broncos in the same league, Woodward was among only two players averaging double-digit scoring during the 2009–2010 season; he averaged 12.2.

=== National Basketball League of Canada (2011–present) ===
Woodyard first came onto the Saint John Mill Rats radar this past April while playing with the Sendai Japan All-Stars in a charity game at Harbour Station. This led to the Mill Rats signing him for the preseason. However, Woodyard was cut by the Mill Rats before the regular season started.

On November 2, it was announced that the Moncton Miracles had signed Woodyard to their active roster.

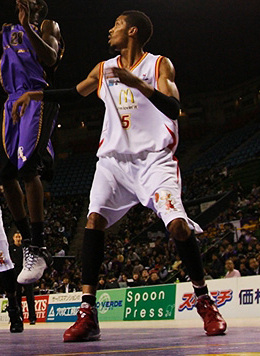
Woodyard with Toyama
