= Rex, Georgia =

- Unincorporated Community
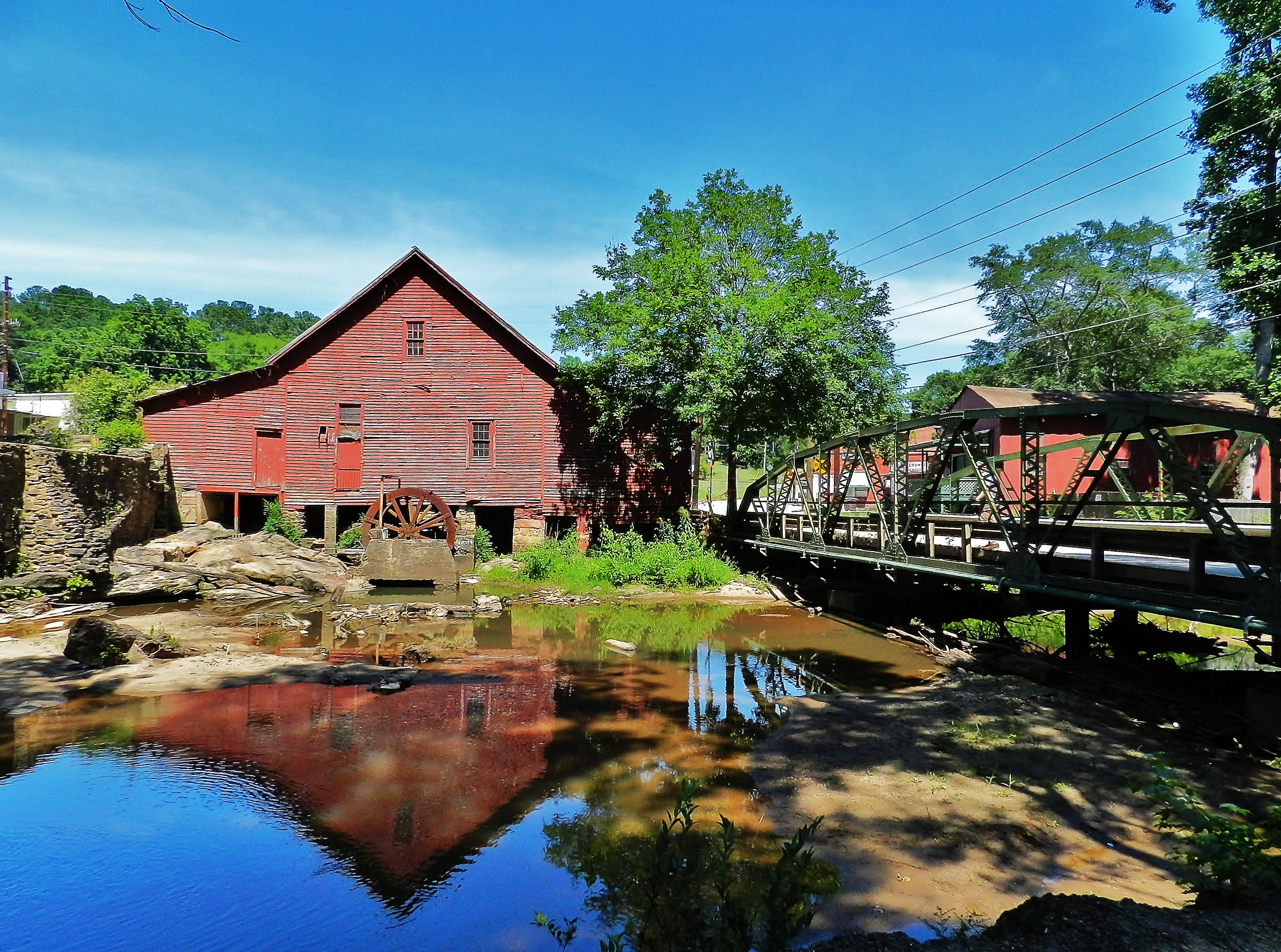
- The NRHP listed Rex Mill, as seen from the side of Mill Walk west of the one-lane bridge.
- Nickname: Hollingsworth
- Location within the state of Georgia Rex (the United States)
- Coordinates: 33°35′31″N 84°16′12″W
- Country: United States
- State: Georgia
- County: Clayton
- Elevation: 797 ft (243 m)

Population (2020)
  - Total: 16,580
- Time zone: UTC-5 (Eastern (EST))
  - Summer (DST): UTC-4 (EDT)
- ZIP codes: 30273
- GNIS feature ID: 332836

Rex (also known as Hollingsworth) is an unincorporated community in Clayton County, Georgia, United States and Henry County, Georgia also. Its elevation is 797 feet (243 m). Although Rex is unincorporated, it has a post office, with the ZIP code of 30273; the ZCTA for ZIP code 30273 had a population of 16,580 at the 2020 census.

== History ==
A post office called Rex was established in 1882. Rex is a name derived from Latin meaning "king".

The Georgia General Assembly incorporated Rex as a town in 1912. The town's municipal charter was repealed in 1922.

The Historic Rex Village was identified as a place in peril by the 2011 Georgia Historic Trust.

== Education ==
Clayton County Public Schools covers areas in Clayton County.

Schools with Rex post office addresses:

- Adamson Middle School
- Rex Mill Middle School
- Roberta T. Smith Elementary School

Morrow High School in Ellenwood is the zoned high school for Rex.

== Notable people ==
- Dexter Davis Jr. (born 1990), football player
- Jamal Hill (born 2001), football player
- Walter Moody (1935–2018), mail bomber who murdered Robert Smith Vance and Robert E. Robinson
