= M. J. Walker =

American basketball player (born 1998)

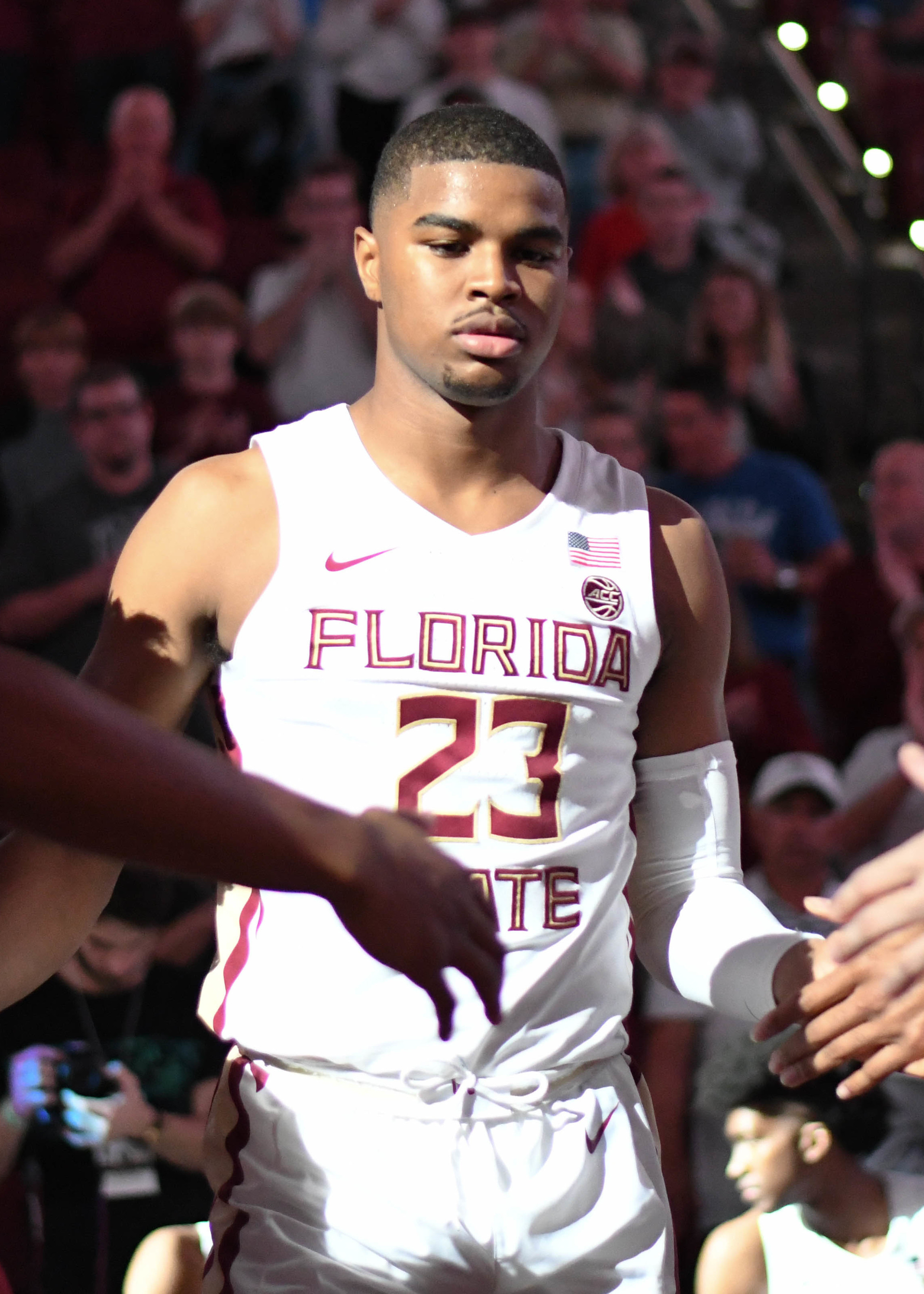
- Walker with Florida State in 2018

No. 23 – Hapoel Be'er Sheva
- Position: Small forward / shooting guard
- League: Israeli Basketball Premier League

Personal information
- Born: March 28, 1998 (age 28) Atlanta, Georgia, U.S.
- Listed height: 6 ft 5 in (1.96 m)
- Listed weight: 213 lb (97 kg)

Career information
- High school: Jonesboro (Jonesboro, Georgia)
- College: Florida State (2017–2021)
- NBA draft: 2021: undrafted
- Playing career: 2021–present

Career history
- 2021–2023: Westchester Knicks
- 2021–2022: Phoenix Suns
- 2023: Vancouver Bandits
- 2023: Brampton Honey Badgers
- 2023–2024: Saint-Quentin
- 2024: Greensboro Swarm
- 2024: Canterbury Rams
- 2024: NBA G League United
- 2024–2025: Greensboro Swarm
- 2025–2026: College Park Skyhawks
- 2026–present: Hapoel Be'er Sheva

Career highlights
- NZNBL champion (2024); Second-team All-ACC (2021); McDonald's All-American (2017); Nike Hoop Summit (2017)
- Stats at NBA.com
- Stats at Basketball Reference
Medals
Men's basketball
Representing United States
FIBA Americas U18 Championship
Gold medal – first place	2016 Chile	Team

James Michael "M. J." Walker Jr. (born March 28, 1998) is an American professional basketball player for Hapoel Be'er Sheva of the Israeli Basketball Premier League. He played college basketball for the Florida State Seminoles, and played in the NBA for the Phoenix Suns.

== High school career ==
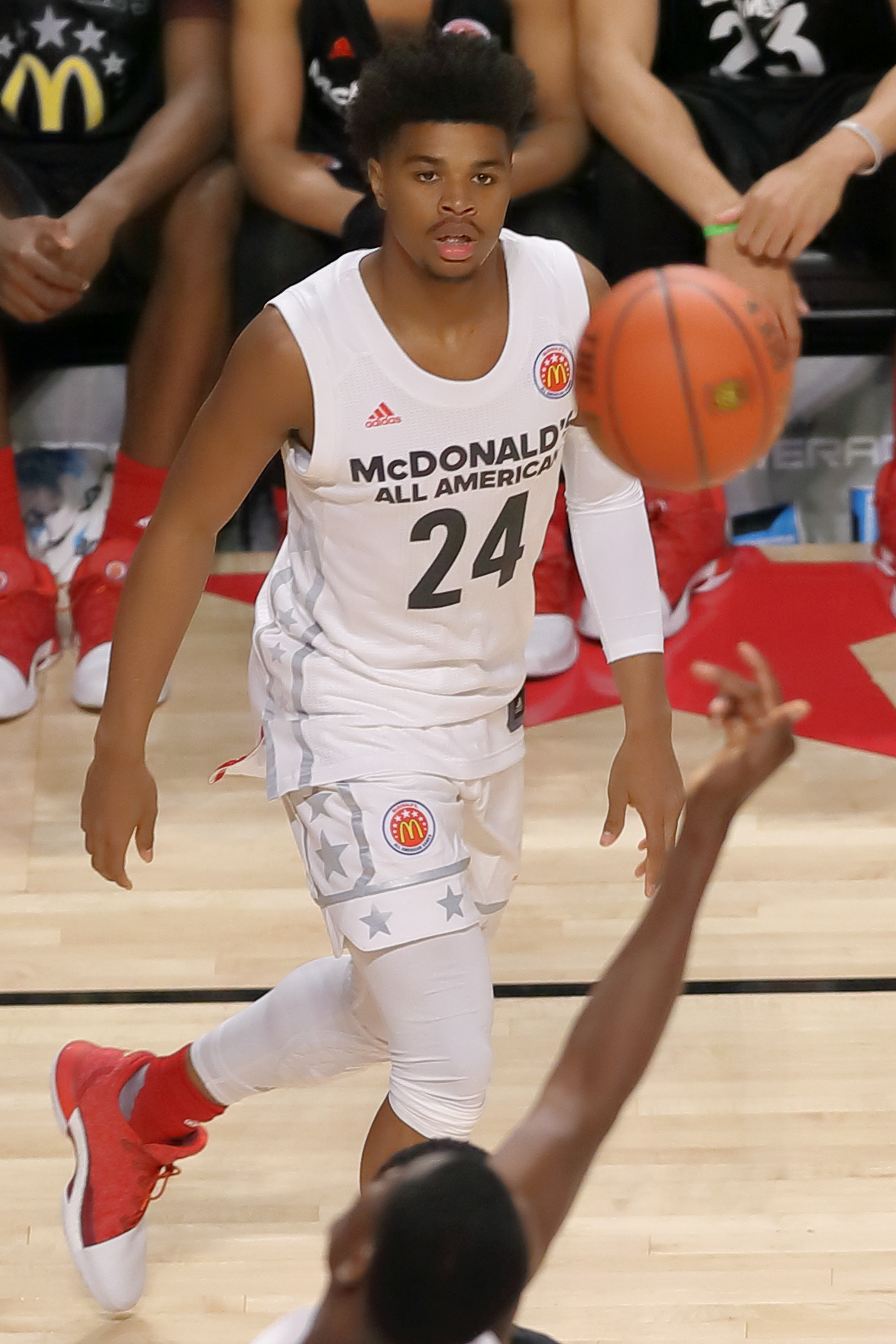
Walker at the 2017 McDonald's All-American Boys Game

Walker attended Jonesboro High School in Jonesboro, Georgia. He initially played football but he decided to focus on basketball after the summer of 2016. As a sophomore in 2014–15, Walker averaged 17.3 points, 4.5 rebounds, 3.0 assists, and 3.0 steals leading Jonesboro to a 32–1 record and the 2015 Georgia Class 4A state championship. As a junior in 2015–16, Walker averaged 22.3 points, 5.6 rebounds, and 3.6 assists leading Jonesboro to a 28–5 record, regional title, and 2015 state title. As a senior in 2016–17, Walker averaged 27.8 points, 6.5 rebounds, and 2.4 assists leading Jonesboro to a 23–6 record.

=== Recruiting ===
Walker was a five-star recruit who received offers from Florida State, Georgia Tech, Ohio State, UCLA, and Virginia Tech. Walker committed to playing college basketball for Florida State.

College recruiting
Name	Hometown	School	Height	Weight	Commit date
M. J. Walker; SG	Riverdale, GA	Jonesboro (GA)	6 ft 5 in (1.96 m)	207 lb (94 kg)	May 24, 2017
M. J. Walker; SG	Recruit ratings: Rivals: 247Sports: ESPN: (92)				
Overall recruit ranking: Rivals: 27 247Sports: 35 ESPN: 27
Note: In many cases, Scout, Rivals, 247Sports, On3, and ESPN may conflict in their listings of height and weight.; In these cases, the average was taken. ESPN grades are on a 100-point scale.; Sources: "Florida State 2017 Basketball Commitments". Rivals.; "2017 Florida State Seminoles Recruiting Class". ESPN.; "2017 Team Ranking". Rivals.

== College career ==
As a sophomore for the Florida State Seminoles, Walker averaged 7.5 points and 2.2 rebounds per game. Florida State compiled a 29–8 record and reached the Sweet Sixteen of the NCAA Tournament. At the conclusion of his junior season, Walker was named All-ACC Honorable Mention.

As a senior, he averaged 12.2 points, 2.5 rebounds, and 2.5 assists per game, earning Second Team All-ACC honors. Following the season, he declared for the 2021 NBA draft, forgoing the additional season of eligibility granted by the NCAA due to the COVID-19 pandemic.

== Professional career ==
=== Westchester Knicks (2021) ===
After going undrafted in the 2021 NBA draft, Walker signed with the New York Knicks on August 20, 2021, but was waived on October 16. In October 2021, he joined the Westchester Knicks as an affiliate player. Walker averaged 10.2 points, 3.5 rebounds and 2.7 assists per game.

=== Phoenix Suns (2021–2022) ===
He signed a 10-day COVID-19 hardship exemption contract with the Phoenix Suns on December 30, 2021. He appeared briefly in two games for the Suns that season.

=== Return to Westchester (2022–2023) ===
On January 9, 2022, Walker was reacquired by the Westchester Knicks. On September 22, Walker resigned with the Knicks on a training camp deal but was waived a day later.

On October 24, 2022, Walker was named to the training camp roster for the Knicks.

=== Vancouver Bandits (2023) ===
On June 6, 2023, Walker signed with the Vancouver Bandits of the Canadian Elite Basketball League. However, he was released on July 8 after averaging 11.2 points through 9 games for the club.

=== Brampton Honey Badgers (2023) ===
On July 29, 2023, Walker signed with the Brampton Honey Badgers of the Canadian Elite Basketball League ahead of the postseason. He played two games for the team, averaging 10.5 points per game.

=== Saint-Quentin (2023–2024) ===
On August 3, 2023, Walker signed with Saint-Quentin of the LNB Pro A in France. He played 19 games for the team.

=== Greensboro Swarm (2024) ===
On January 19, 2024, Walker joined the Greensboro Swarm.

=== Canterbury Rams (2024) ===
On March 12, 2024, Walker signed with the Canterbury Rams of the New Zealand National Basketball League (NZNBL) for the 2024 season. He averaged 17.2 points, 2.8 rebounds, 2.4 assists, and 25.8 minutes per game, shooting 83.1% from the free throw line.

=== Return to Greensboro (2024–2025) ===
On October 27, 2024, Walker rejoined the Greensboro Swarm, but was waived on November 13, after one game. However, he was re-signed six days later.

=== College Park Skyhawks (2025–26) ===
On October 13, 2025, Walker signed with the Atlanta Hawks. However, he was waived the next day and would join the College Park Skyhawks. With them, he averaged 9.7 points, 2.3 rebounds, 2.4 assists, and 23.0 minutes per game, in 35 games.

=== Hapoel Be'er Sheva (2026–present) ===
On September 23, 2026, he joined Hapoel Be'er Sheva of the Israeli Basketball Premier League for the 2026-27 season.

== National team career ==
Walker played for the United States national under-18 team at the 2016 FIBA Americas Under-18 Championship in Valdivia, Chile. In four games, he averaged 2 points and 1.8 rebounds per game, helping his team win the gold medal.

== Career statistics ==
Legend
GP	Games played	GS	Games started	MPG	Minutes per game
FG%	Field goal percentage	3P%	3-point field goal percentage	FT%	Free throw percentage
RPG	Rebounds per game	APG	Assists per game	SPG	Steals per game
BPG	Blocks per game	PPG	Points per game	**Bold**	Career high

=== NBA ===
Year	Team	GP	GS	MPG	FG%	3P%	FT%	RPG	APG	SPG	BPG	PPG
2021–22	Phoenix	2	0	4.2	.000	.000	–	.5	.5	1.0	.0	.0
Career		2	0	4.2	.000	.000	–	.5	.5	1.0	.0	.0

=== College ===
Year	Team	GP	GS	MPG	FG%	3P%	FT%	RPG	APG	SPG	BPG	PPG
2017–18	Florida State	**35**	1	18.8	.379	.345	.754	1.7	1.1	.6	.1	7.0
2018–19	Florida State	**35**	**34**	25.9	.340	.328	.778	2.2	1.6	.8	.2	7.5
2019–20	Florida State	26	24	25.2	.371	.361	**.803**	1.7	1.5	.8	.2	10.6
2020–21	Florida State	24	23	**29.0**	**.436**	**.423**	.797	**2.5**	**2.5**	**.9**	**.4**	**12.2**
Career		120	82	24.3	.380	.361	.785	2.0	1.6	.8	.2	9.0

== Personal life ==
Walker is the son of James and Jackie Walker, and has an older sister, Amoni, who plays for Miles College. His father, James, played college basketball at Norfolk State University and his mother, Jackie, played women's college basketball for Hampton University.
