= Twelve Oaks Stadium =

High school sports stadium in Georgia, US

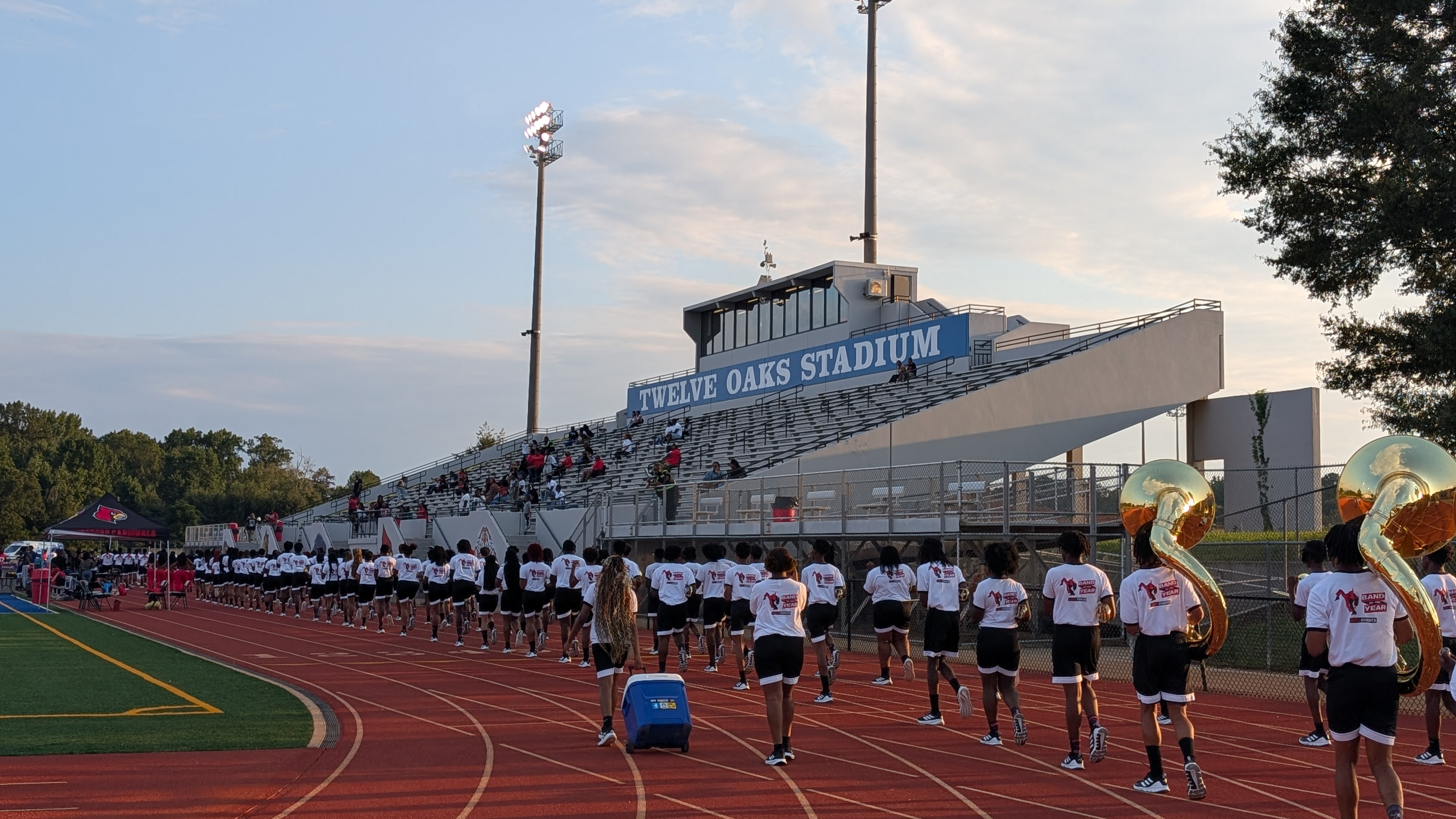
- Jonesboro Majestic Marching Cardinals marching into Twelve Oaks Stadium
- Interactive map of Twelve Oaks Stadium
- Address: 1587 McDonough Rd; Hampton, Georgia; United States
- Coordinates: 33°22′59″N 84°15′41″W
- Owner: Clayton County Public Schools
- Operator: Clayton County Public Schools
- Capacity: 4,700
- Surface: Field turf

Construction
- Opened: 1990

Tenant
- Clayton County Public Schools

Twelve Oaks Stadium is a 4,700 seat stadium in Hampton, Georgia, United States. It was built in 1990 and is a shared home stadium for Clayton County Public Schools. It is the second oldest of the four stadiums in Clayton County; the other stadiums are Hines Ward Field at Tara Stadium, Southern Crescent Stadium and Steele Road Stadium.

== History ==
Twelve Oaks Stadium opened in 1990 at a cost of $2.1 million.
