= Jamal Hill =

Jamal Hill may refer to:

- Jamal Hill (swimmer) (born 1995), American Paralympic swimmer
- Jamal Hill (American football) (born 2001), American football linebacker
