= Steele Road Stadium =

High school sports stadium in Georgia, US

- Steele Road
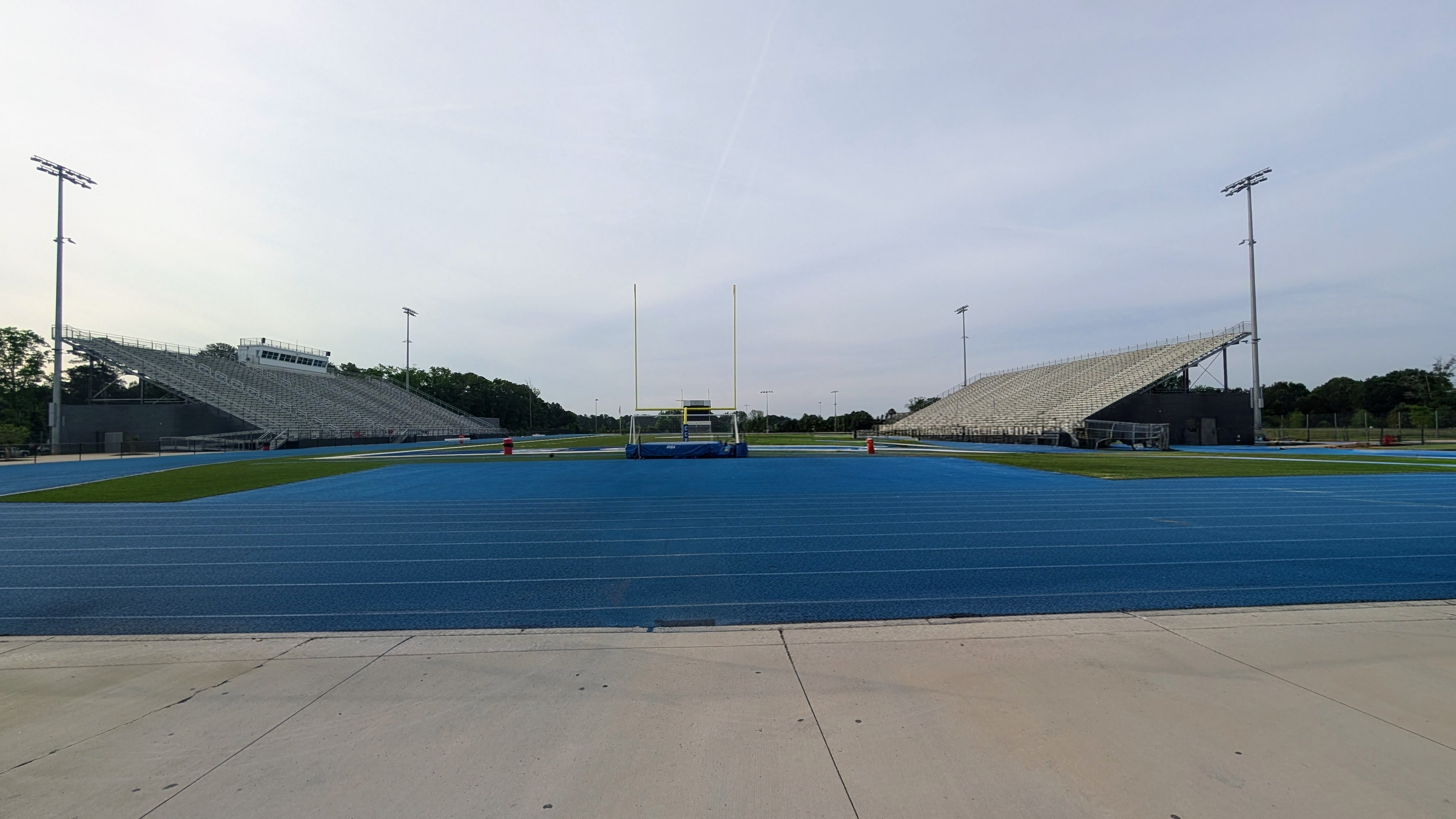
- Interactive map of Steele Road Stadium
- Address: 4930 Steele Rd, Riverdale, Georgia; United States
- Coordinates: 33°37′16″N 84°16′0″W
- Owner: Clayton County Public Schools
- Operator: Clayton County Public Schools
- Capacity: 6,600
- Surface: Field turf

Construction
- Opened: 2023

Tenants
- Clayton County Public Schools; Clayton State University Club Football (2024-Present)

Steele Road Stadium is a 6,600 seat stadium in Ellenwood, Georgia, United States. It was built in 2023 and is a shared home stadium for Clayton County Public Schools. It is the youngest of the four stadiums in Clayton County; the other stadiums are Hines Ward Field at Tara Stadium, Twelve Oaks Stadium and Southern Crescent Stadium.

Steele Road Stadium opened in 2023 along with the brand new Morrow High School at a cost of $86 million.

In 2024, Clayton State University club football team began playing their home games at Steele Road Stadium.
