= Elite Scholars Academy =

Public school in Jonesboro, Georgia, United States

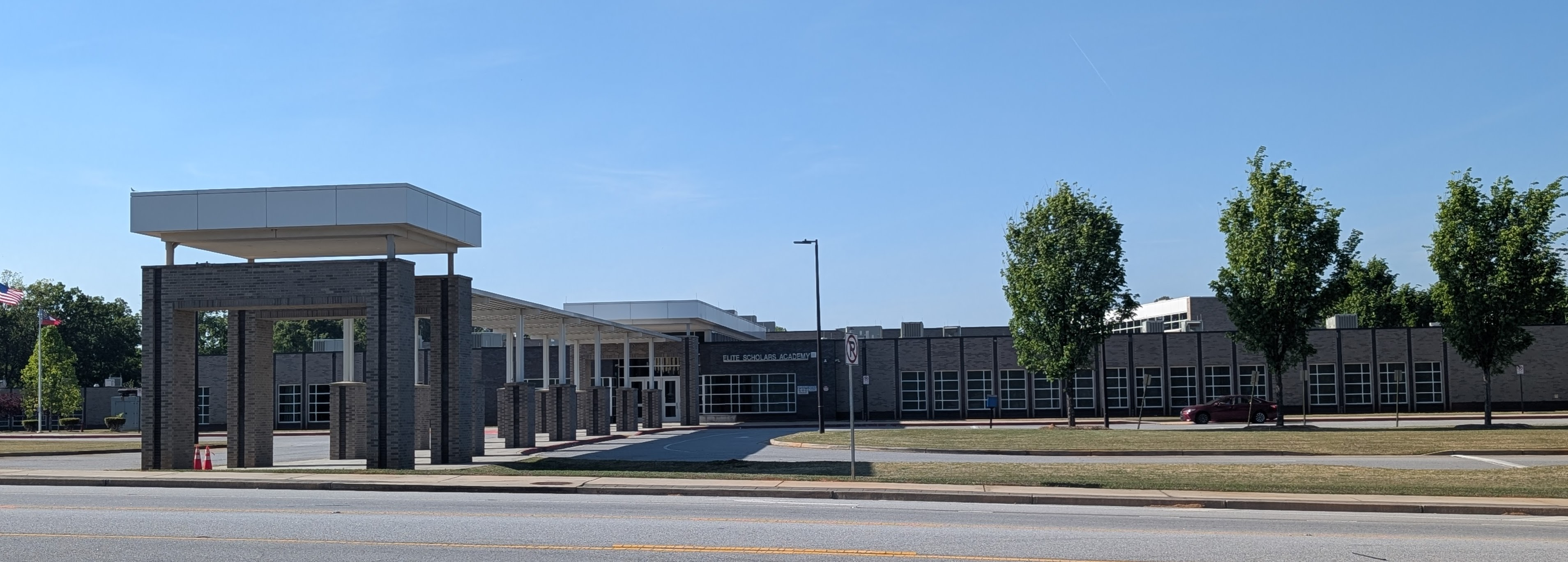
- Exterior front entrance

Location
- 7923 Fielder Road; Jonesboro, Clayton County, Georgia 30236; United States; 33°32′22″N 84°19′32″W

Information
- Type: Public
- Established: Fall 2009
- School district: Clayton County Public Schools
- Principal: Samuel West
- Teaching staff: 40.00 (on an FTE basis)
- Grades: 6–12
- Enrollment: 757 (2024–2025)
- Student to teacher ratio: 18.92
- Colors: Blue and Yellow Gold
- Mascot: Royal Knights
- Team name: Royal Knights
- Website: https://099.clayton.k12.ga.us/

Elite Scholars Academy is located at 7923 Fielder Road in unincorporated Clayton County, Georgia, United States, with a Jonesboro post office address. It is part of Clayton County Public Schools. Elite Scholars Academy (ESA) is a 6–12 Early College Magnet School within the Clayton County Public School District. Renowned for its rigorous academic environment, the school is also a certified Cambridge Assessment International institution. Founded in 2009 as a public charter school, ESA transitioned from a charter school to a magnet school in 2016. In 2016, ESA relocated to its current state-of-the-art campus in Jonesboro. At a cost of $22.2 million investment, the Fielder Road facility is designed to support up to 700 students with modern resources.

== Controversies ==
In 2013, a teacher at the Academy was arrested for allegedly sexually assaulting a student at the school.

In 2021, two coaches of the Academy's girl's basketball team were charged with murder and manslaughter charges after the death of a student during practice in extreme heat. In November 2022, the family and the Academy settled a wrongful death lawsuit for $10 million.
