= Riverdale, Georgia =

- City
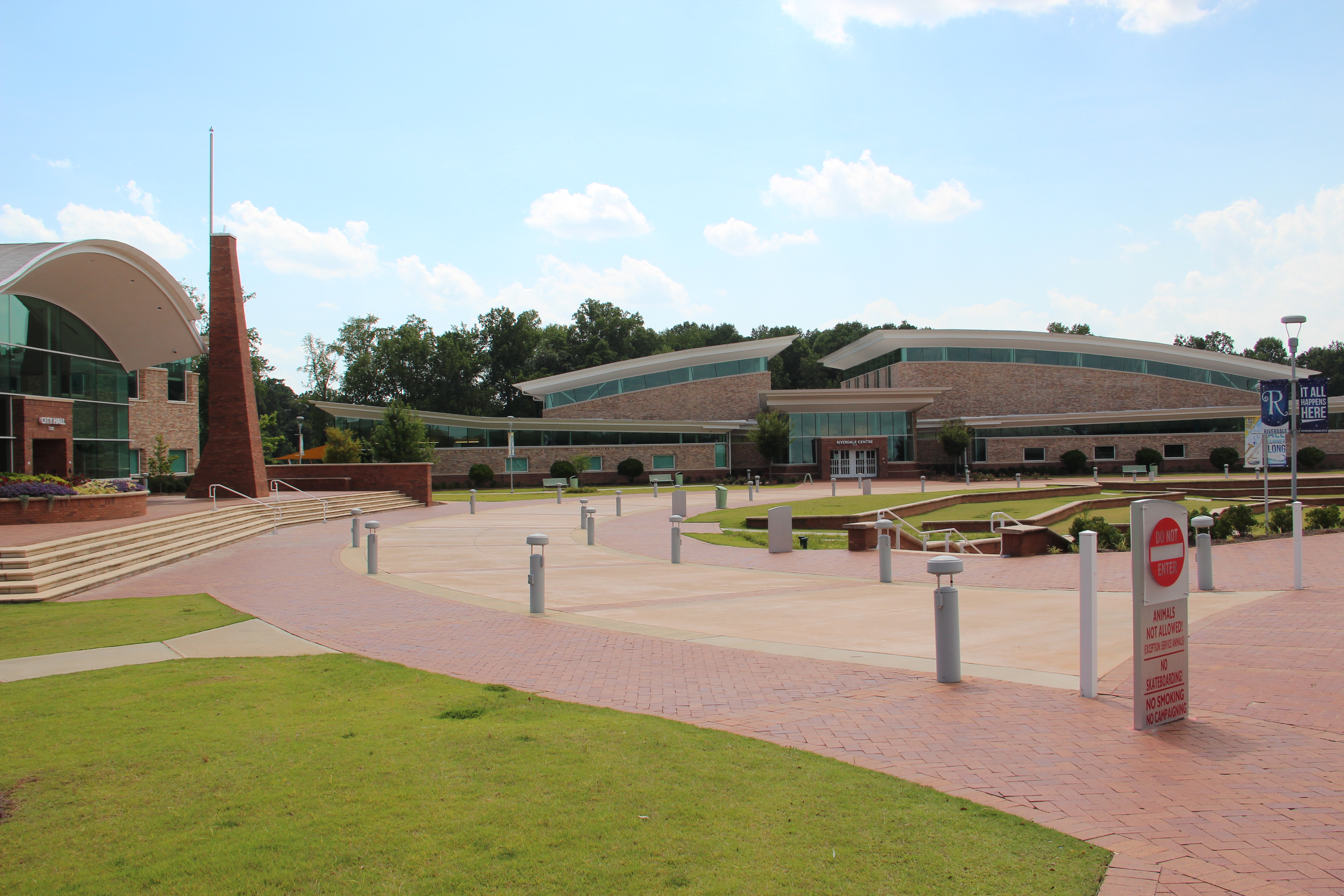
- Riverdale Town Center
- Motto: Building Greatness Daily
- Location in Clayton County and the state of Georgia
- Coordinates: 33°33′53″N 84°24′38″W
- Country: United States
- State: Georgia
- County: Clayton

Area
  - Total: 4.42 sq mi (11.46 km^{2})
  - Land: 4.42 sq mi (11.44 km^{2})
  - Water: 0.0039 sq mi (0.01 km^{2})
- Elevation: 925 ft (282 m)

Population (2020)
  - Total: 15,129
  - Density: 3,424.1/sq mi (1,322.04/km^{2})
- Time zone: UTC-5 (Eastern (EST))
  - Summer (DST): UTC-4 (EDT)
- ZIP codes: 30274, 30296
- Area codes: 770/678/470
- FIPS code: 13-65464
- GNIS feature ID: 0321635
- Website: www.riverdalega.gov

Riverdale is a city in Clayton County, Georgia, United States. The population was 15,129 in 2020. Riverdale is an Atlanta suburb just south of Hartsfield–Jackson Atlanta International Airport. The city is part of the Atlanta metropolitan area.

== History ==
The area now known as Riverdale was settled before the Civil War. Riverdale was founded in 1886, when the railroad was extended there. Named for Mr. W. S. Rivers, the original owner of the town site who donated his land to the railroad company, the city was incorporated in 1908.

Monroe Huie, a farmer, supplied lumber to the local railway network. Whenever the train arrived to collect wood, it also delivered fertilizer to the region. As a result, fertilizer sales became the primary business endeavor in the area. Prior to the construction of the spur, fertilizer had to be transported in wagons from the nearby town of Jonesboro.

In 2024, an investigation by the "FOX 5 I-Team" in Atlanta discovered that hundreds of traffic tickets had been issued improperly by robotic traffic control cameras in school zones. The city was compelled to issue refunds and an apology. Police Chief Todd Spivey put it this way: "Initially, this was presented as a good idea, as a good way to slow the people down and create safer school zones. But if we’re going to engage in constant problems and losing the trust of the public because of the issuing of civil-penalty citations, do we need to revisit the idea of, is it really working?"

== Geography ==
Riverdale is in western Clayton County, 12 miles (19 km) south of downtown Atlanta and 6 miles (10 km) northwest of Jonesboro, the county seat.

According to the U.S. Census Bureau, Riverdale has an area of 4.5 square miles (11.6 km^{2}), of which 0.012 square miles (0.03 km^{2}), or 0.22%, is water.

== Demographics ==
Historical population
Census	Pop.	Note	%±
1910	139		—
1920	159		14.4%
1930	158		−0.6%
1940	207		31.0%
1950	263		27.1%
1960	1,045		297.3%
1970	2,521		141.2%
1980	7,121		182.5%
1990	9,359		31.4%
2000	12,478		33.3%
2010	15,134		21.3%
2020	15,129		0.0%
2025 (est.)	14,637	▼	−3.3%
U.S. Decennial Census; 1850-1870 1870-1880; 1890-1910 1920-1930; 1940 1950 1960; 1970 1980 1990; 2000 2010; 2025

=== 2020 census ===
As of the 2020 census, Riverdale had a population of 15,129. The median age was 35.8 years. About 25.0% of residents were under the age of 18 and 11.8% were 65 years of age or older. For every 100 females there were 85.0 males, and for every 100 females age 18 and over there were 79.6 males age 18 and over.

100.0% of residents lived in urban areas, while 0.0% lived in rural areas.

There were 5,608 households in Riverdale, including 3,404 families. Of all households, 35.6% had children under the age of 18 living in them, 27.7% were married-couple households, 21.8% were households with a male householder and no spouse or partner present, and 43.1% were households with a female householder and no spouse or partner present. About 29.7% of all households were made up of individuals, and 8.6% had someone living alone who was 65 years of age or older.

There were 5,967 housing units, of which 6.0% were vacant. The homeowner vacancy rate was 1.4% and the rental vacancy rate was 6.9%.

Riverdale racial composition as of 2020
Race	Num.	Perc.
White (non-Hispanic)	620	4.1%
Black or African American (non-Hispanic)	11,776	77.84%
Native American	34	0.22%
Asian	881	5.82%
Pacific Islander	1	0.01%
Other/Mixed	442	2.92%
Hispanic or Latino	1,375	9.09%

== Parks and recreation ==
The city currently has three parks, all within a mile of each other:

- Travon D. Wilson Memorial Park on Church St. behind the Merchant Shopping Center
- Church Park on Wilson Rd. behind the First Baptist Church of Riverdale
- Banks Park on Main St. and West St. next to city hall

Frank Bailey Senior Center, operated by the Clayton County government, is adjacent to Riverdale and has a Riverdale post office address. There is also the Flint River Community Center, also operated by the county government, located south of Riverdale, also with a Riverdale post office address.

== Government ==
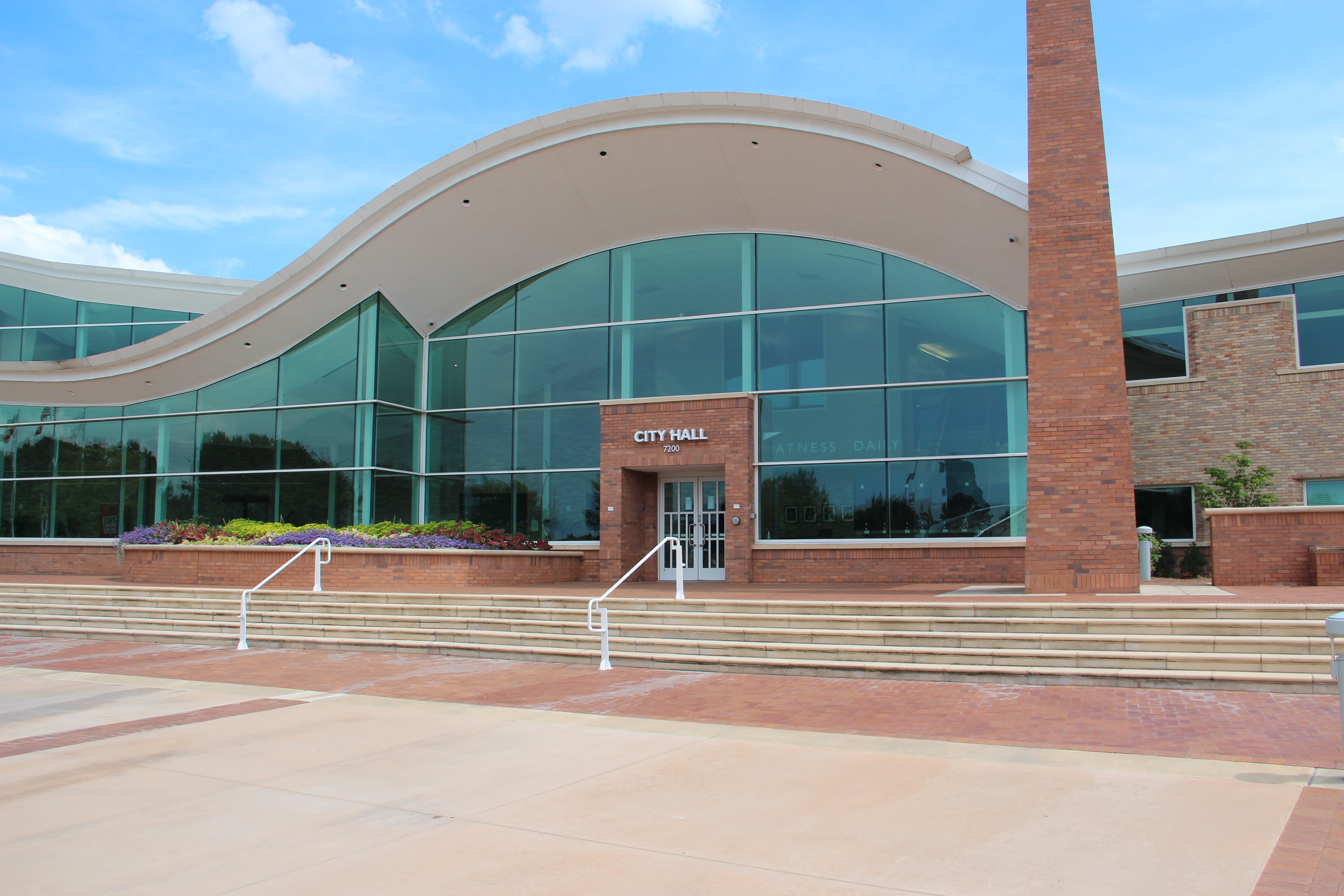
Riverdale City Hall

The city is governed by a mayor and four council members. Each council member represents the entire city and is elected at-large. Council members come from the four wards that divide the city. The mayor and council appoint a city manager, who has oversight over five departments. They also further appoint a municipal judge and judges pro tempore to serve in the city's municipal court.

The Clayton County Police Department operates the Precinct 2 office near Riverdale, with a Riverdale post office address.

Clayton County Senior Services, an organ of the county government, is headquartered in Riverdale.

== Education ==
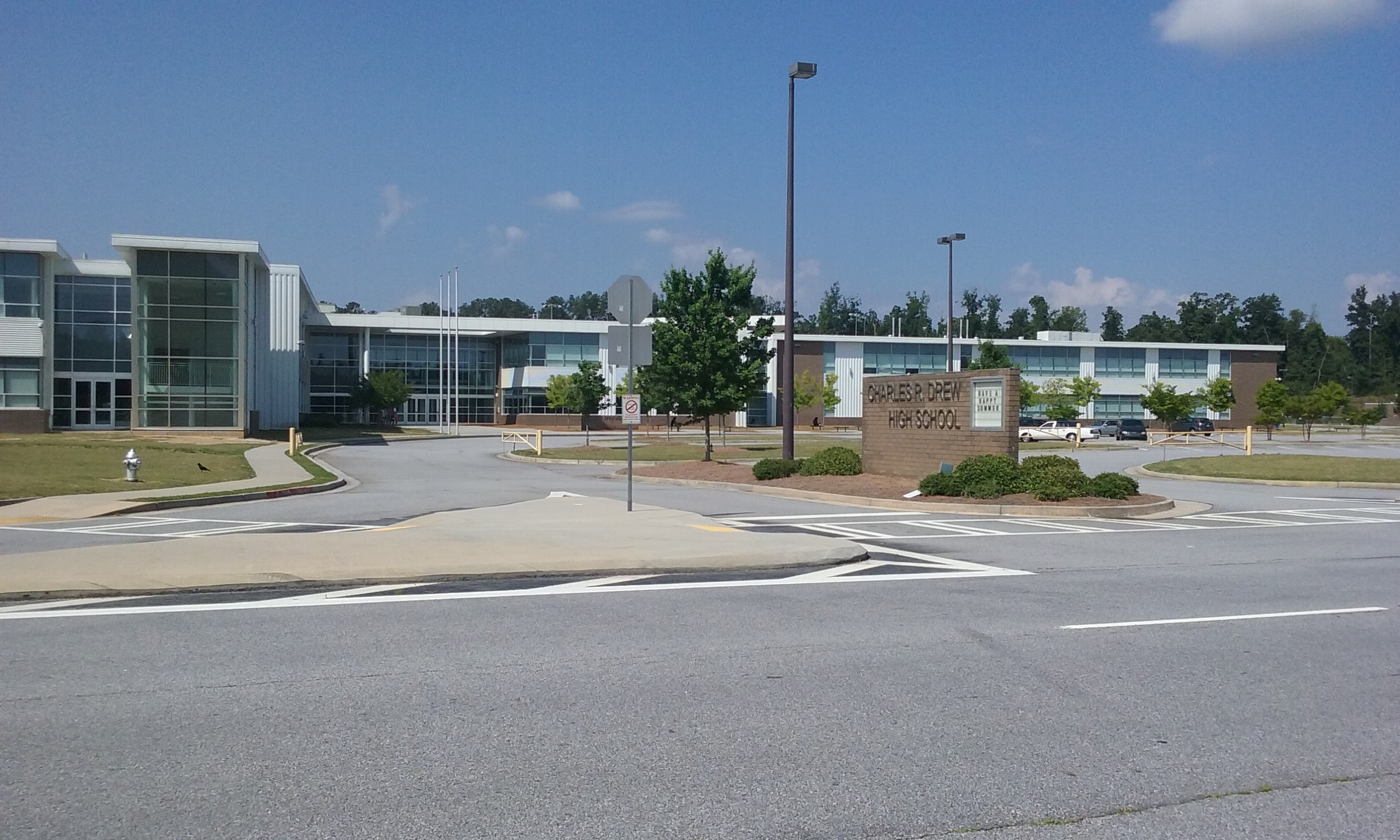
Charles R. Drew High School

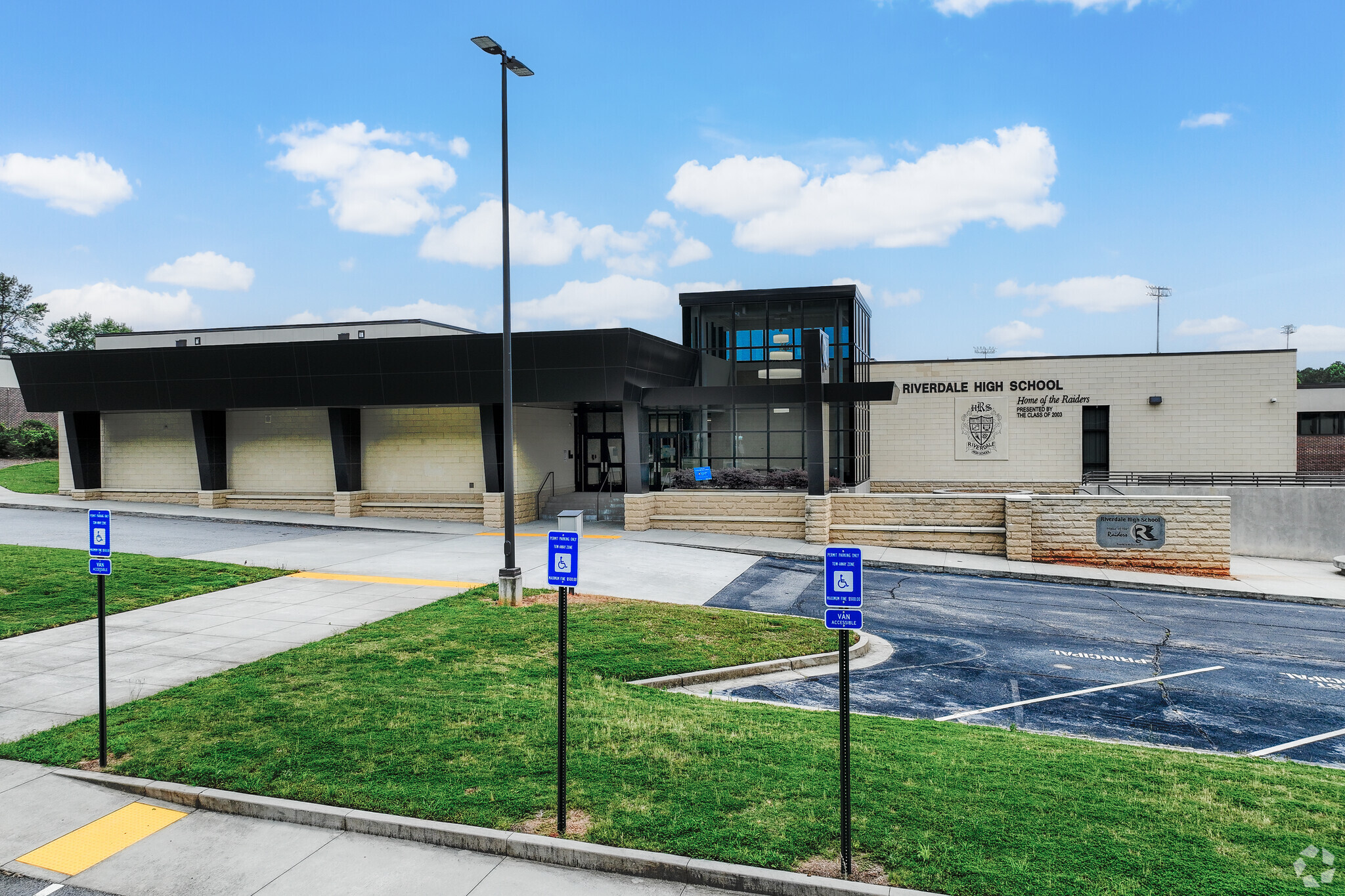
Riverdale High School

Schools in Riverdale are in the Clayton County School System. Schools located in Riverdale include:

- Charles Drew High School
- Church Street Elementary School
- Harper Elementary School
- Lake Ridge Elementary
- Oliver Elementary School
- Pointe South Elementary School
- Riverdale Elementary School
- Riverdale High School
- Riverdale Middle School
- Sequoyah Middle School
- Smith Elementary School

Clayton County Library System operates the Riverdale Branch, in the city limits; as well as the Northwest Branch, adjacent to the city limits.

== Infrastructure ==
=== Transportation ===
==== State highways ====
- Georgia State Route 85 (Clark Howell Memorial Hwy)
- Georgia State Route 138 (Martin Luther King Jr. Hwy)
- Georgia State Route 139 (Main St./Riverdale Rd.)
- Georgia State Route 314 (Fayetteville Rd., running west of the city limits)

==== Main roads ====
These are roads with more than four lanes.

- Gardenwalk Boulevard
- Lamar Hutcheson Parkway
- Pointe South Parkway
- Upper Riverdale Road

==== Minor roads ====
These are roads with two to four lanes. or other 785.

- Church Street
- Roberts Drive
- Taylor Road
- Valley Hill Road
- Bethsaida Road
- Helmer Road
- Thomas Road
- E. Fayetteville Road
- Rountree Road
- Roy Huie Road

==== Interstate highway ====
Interstate 75 passes northeast of the city limits.

==== Transit ====
Two MARTA bus routes serve the city, including:

- Route 191 – Justice Center/Hartsfield Intl
- Route 196 – Church/Upper Riverdale/Mt.Zion

== Notable people ==
- Kofi Amichia (born 1994), professional NFL football offensive tackle
- Nina BoNina Brown, drag queen, appeared on RuPaul's Drag Race TV competition series, season 9
- Devontae Cacok (born 1996), Israeli Basketball Premier League, and formerly NBA, basketball center
- Playboi Carti, rapper, hip-hop artist,
- Ciara, singer-songwriter
- Edawn Coughman (born 1988), NFL and CFL football offensive tackle
- Waka Flocka Flame, hip-hop musician
- Cordy Glenn (born 1989), NFL offensive tackle
- Deante' Hitchcock, rapper
- Ashley Holcombe (born 1987), softball catcher
- Larry June, rapper
- Sherrilyn Kenyon, author
- Barry Loudermilk, U.S. representative for Georgia
- Will Rackley (born 1989), NFL offensive guard
- DJ Shockley (born 1983), NFL quarterback
- Cecil Travis (1913– 2006), professional Major League baseball player
- Lavelle Westbrooks (born 1992), NFL and CFL professional football cornerback
- James Woodall, president of the Georgia NAACP
