= Charles Drew High School =

Public school in Riverdale, Georgia, United States

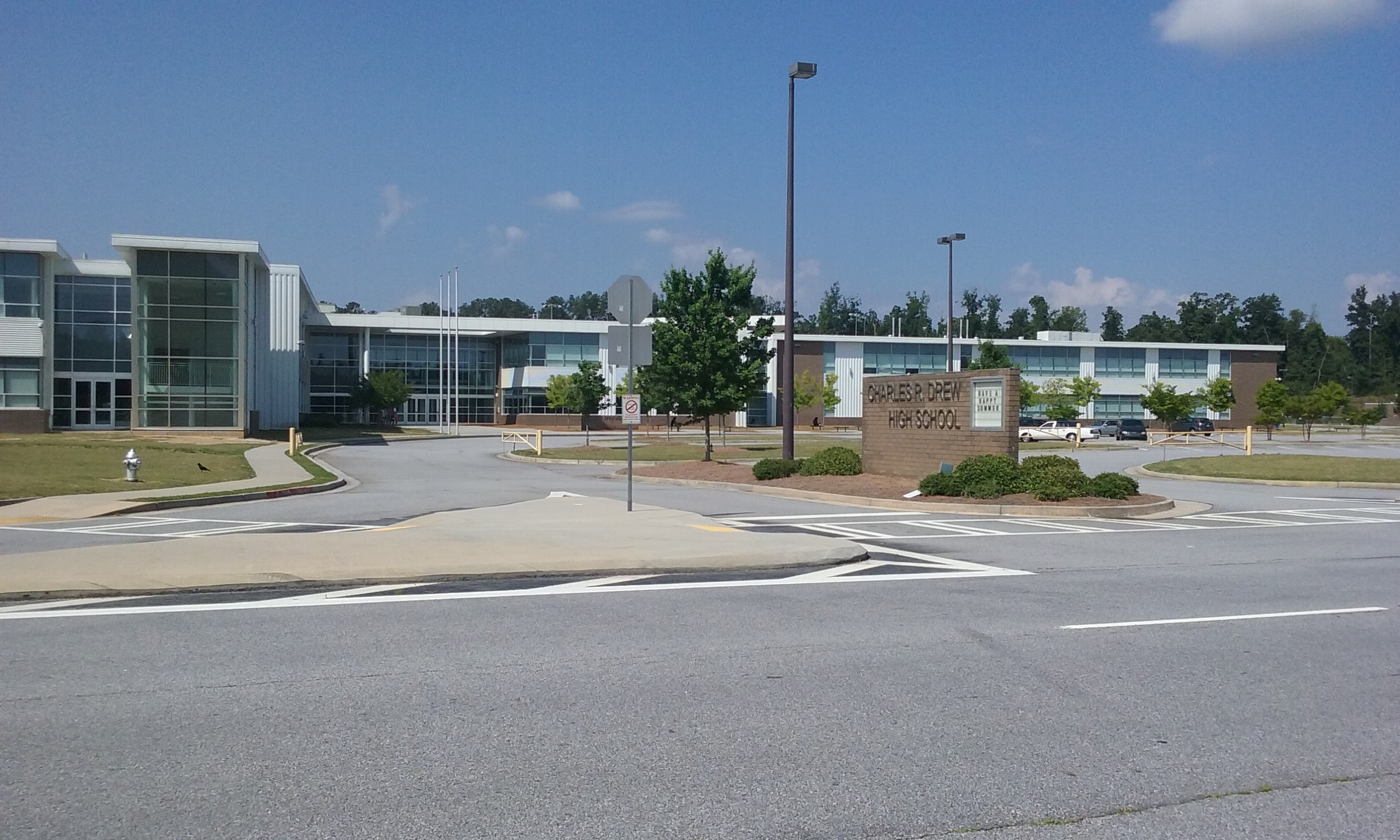

Location
- 6237 Garden Walk Boulevard; Riverdale, Clayton County, Georgia 30274; United States; 33°35′12″N 84°23′45″W

Information
- Type: Public
- Established: Fall 2009
- School district: Clayton County Public Schools
- Principal: Tangela Benjamin
- Teaching staff: 96.00 (on an FTE basis)
- Grades: 9–12
- Enrollment: 1,708 (2024–2025)
- Student to teacher ratio: 17.79
- Colors: Navy and Vegas Gold
- Mascot: Titan
- Team name: Titans
- Website: https://315.clayton.k12.ga.us

Charles R. Drew High School is located at 6237 Garden Walk Boulevard in Riverdale, Georgia, United States. It is part of Clayton County Public Schools. The school's teams are known as the Titans. Drew High School was built along with neighboring Southern Crescent Stadium.

The school's attendance boundary includes: southwestern parts of Morrow.

== Notable alumni ==
- Ahmad Caver (born 1996), basketball player in the Israeli Basketball Premier League
- Devontae Cacok (born 1996), Israeli Basketball Premier League, and formerly NBA, basketball center
