= Mundy's Mill High School =

Public school in Jonesboro, Georgia, United States

Coordinates: 33.4914°N 84.3839°W

Location
- 9652 Fayetteville Road; Jonesboro, (Clayton County), Georgia 30238; United States

Information
- Type: Public high school
- Established: 2002
- Principal: Sheadric Barbra
- Staff: 91.00 (FTE)
- Enrollment: 1,665 (2024-2025)
- Student to teacher ratio: 18.30
- Colors: Blue and orange
- Nickname: Tigers

Mundy's Mill High School is a public school in the Clayton County Public Schools (CCPS) system in unincorporated Clayton County, Georgia, United States, with a Jonesboro post office address. The school's teams compete as the Tigers. It opened in October 2002.

Small parts of the Jonesboro city limits are zoned to this school.
