= James Woodall =

American minister, politician and activist

President of the Georgia NAACP
- In office October 2019 - July 2021

Personal details
- Born: February 1, 1994 (age 32) Riverdale, Georgia, USA
- Education: Georgia Southern University; Morehouse College
- Occupation: Minister
- Military career
- Allegiance: USA
- Branch: US Army
- Rank: Sergeant

James Woodall (born February 1, 1994) is an American Baptist minister, politician and activist. Woodall is the former president of the Georgia NAACP, serving in the position from 2019 to 2021.

== Early life and education ==
James Woodall was born in Riverdale, Georgia in 1994. He was a member of the ROTC in high school. He earned an undergraduate degree from Georgia Southern University (GSU) in 2016. While attending GSU, he worked for Francys Johnson as a legal assistant. He completed his master's at the Interdenominational Theological Center at Morehouse College.

== Career ==
Woodall is a former intelligence analyst for the United States Army. He served in the Army for eight years and left as a sergeant. He currently serves as a minister at Pleasant Grove Missionary Church in Marietta, Georgia. Woodall is also a legislative aide to Georgia state representative Miriam Paris.

=== Politics and activism ===
Woodall became active in the NAACP in 2015 after the deaths of Eric Garner and Trayvon Martin. He graduated from the NAACP's Next-Gen leadership program. During that time, he was president of the state's youth and college program and also vice president of the Bulloch County NAACP. He was elected president of the Georgia state NAACP in October 2019, making him the youngest Georgia NAACP president in the organization's history.

Woodall ran as a Democrat for Georgia's 160th House district in the 2016 election, losing to Republican incumbent Jan Tankersley.

In the wake of the 2020 United States presidential election in Georgia, Georgia Secretary of State Brad Raffensperger created a bipartisan election task force, in October, to improve voting systems and law in the state. Woodall was named to the task force. On December 30, 2020, Woodall quit the task force calling it a "farce", that "it's all for show," and that no actions have taken place despite numerous task force meetings.
