= Jonesboro High School (Georgia) =

Public high school in Jonesboro, Georgia, United States

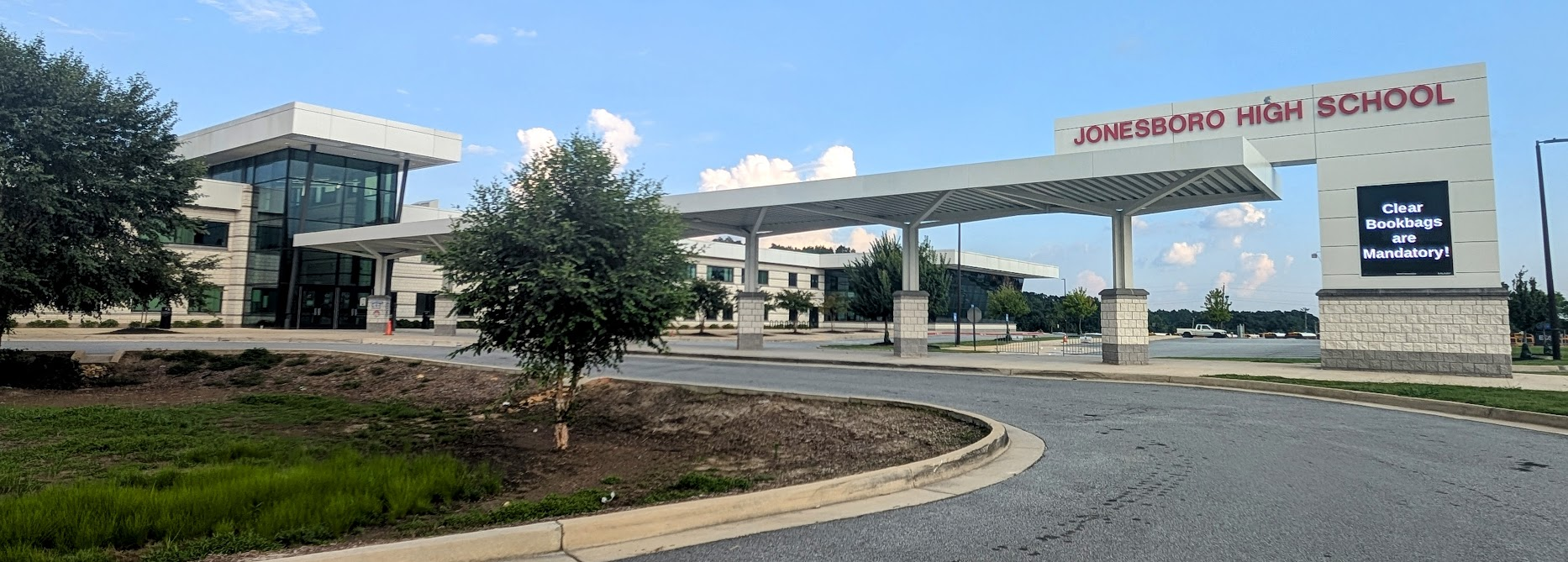

Location
- 7728 Mt. Zion Boulevard; Jonesboro, Georgia 30236; United States; 33°32′35″N 84°20′32″W

Information
- Type: Public secondary
- Established: 1891
- School district: Clayton County Public Schools
- Superintendent: Douglas Hendrix Sr.
- Principal: Tenisha Bailey
- Teaching staff: 77.00 (on an FTE basis)
- Grades: 9–12
- Enrollment: 1,630 (2024–2025)
- Student to teacher ratio: 21.17
- Campus: Suburban
- Colors: white, red, and black
- Mascot: Cardinals
- Website: Jonesboro High School

Jonesboro High School is a four-year public high school located in unincorporated Clayton County, Georgia, United States, with a Jonesboro postal address. The school is part of the Clayton County School District, and is located at 7728 Mt. Zion Boulevard.

The school's teams are known as the Cardinals, and the school colors are red, white, and black. U.S. News & World Report selected Jonesboro as one of the top 100 schools in the United States in its December 1998 issue. The school has produced several notable alumni.

Established as a public high school on September 21, 1891, Jonesboro High School was originally located on College Street. The school was moved to Spring Street during the Christmas break of 1917 and moved again to its present location on the corner of Mt. Zion Boulevard in the fall of 1963.

The school's attendance boundary covers the vast majority of the Jonesboro city limits.

== Campus ==
The library originally started out in what is now the ROTC room and was moved into its own building in 1968. In 1975 the vocational building was completed, giving JHS the chance to expand its faculty to include assistant principals, counselors, and vocational teachers. A technology lab was added in the 1994–95 school year.

Jonesboro High School underwent construction starting the 2006–07 school year for the addition of a freshman wing. The wing was completed for use in the 2007–2008 school year, and opened in February 2008. This addition cost the county a total of $4,025,593. The school is getting an auxiliary gymnasium. The work began on June 15, 2010, and the date of opening is unknown. The addition of this new building is costing the county an estimated $2,250,000.

== Extracurricular activities ==
The school's Majestic Marching Cardinals has been selected to marching in the 2027 Rose Parade in Pasadena, California on January 1, 2027.

=== Athletics ===
Jonesboro High School competes in many varies sports such as:

- Baseball
- Basketball
- Cheerleading
- Cross country
- Football
- Golf
- Soccer
- Softball
- Tennis
- Swimming
- Track & field
- Wrestling
- Volleyball

The boys basketball team has won two state championships in years 2014 and 2015.

== Awards and recognition ==
Jonesboro High School won the 2007 National High School Mock Trial Championship, held in Dallas, Texas and again in 2008 in Wilmington, Delaware.

== Notable alumni ==
- Steve Lundquist (1979), swimmer; won two Olympic gold medals at the 1984 Summer Olympics in Los Angeles, California
- Jason Perry (1999), former MLB outfielder
- Harry Douglas (2003), wide receiver who played for the Tennessee Titans and Atlanta Falcons
- Toney Douglas (2004), basketball player in the Israeli Basketball Premier League; played for 7 NBA teams
- Cameron Sutton (2013), NFL cornerback for the Detroit Lions
- M. J. Walker (2017), basketball player in the Israeli Basketball Premier League, who played for the NBA's Phoenix Suns
