= 1964 Volunteer 500 =

Auto race held at Bristol Motor Speedway in 1964

Race details
- Race 42 of 62 in the 1964 NASCAR Grand National Series season
- Layout of Bristol Motor Speedway
- Date: July 26, 1964
- Official name: Volunteer 500
- Location: Bristol International Speedway, Bristol, Tennessee
- Course: Permanent racing facility
- Course length: 0.857 km (0.533 miles)
- Distance: 500 laps, 266.5 mi (428.8 km)
- Weather: Very hot with temperatures of 87.1 °F (30.6 °C); wind speeds of 7 miles per hour (11 km/h)
- Average speed: 78.004 mph (125.535 km/h)
- Attendance: 25,500

Pole position
| Driver | Richard Petty | Petty Enterprises |

Most laps led
| Driver | Richard Petty | Petty Enterprises |
- Laps: 442

Winner
| No. 28 | Fred Lorenzen | Holman-Moody |

Television in the United States
- Network: untelevised
- Announcers: none

The 1964 Volunteer 500 was a NASCAR Grand National Series event that was held on July 26, 1964, at Bristol International Speedway in Bristol, Tennessee.

Buddy Baker won the Saturday qualifying race to earn 25th starting position, but was replaced by Jimmy Helms in the 500 lap feature.

== Race report ==
There was a racing grid of 36 drivers who were all born in the United States of America. Fred Lorenzen defeated Richard Petty by slightly more than a lap in front of 25,500 people in order to win the top prize of $4,185 USD ($42,429 when adjusted for inflation). Petty was considered to be on pace to win the race until his rear end failed on the last lap; forcing him to accept a second-place finish. However, Petty's car developed the problem sometime before starting the final lap. As a result, Petty had a big enough lead to where Lorenzen did not catch him until the car failed entirely.

Five lead changes were made and the caution flag was waved only once for 14 laps. Darrell Bryant received the last place finish and a measly $275 paycheck ($2,788 when adjusted for inflation) for a fuel pressure issue on lap 1 that forced him out of the race. Petty would receive the pole position for his qualifying speed of 82.910 miles per hour (133.431 km/h) while the average speed of the race would be 78.044 miles per hour (125.600 km/h).

Bristol was a flatter track during the 1960s and the banking was more shallow.

Darrell Bryant and Doug Wilson would make their NASCAR debuts here. Johnny Nave would exit the NASCAR Cup Series after this race. Fourteen notable crew chiefs participated in the event; including Herman Beam, Glen Wood, Banjo Matthews, Herb Nab and Jimmy Helms.

The transition to purpose-built racecars began in the early 1960s and occurred gradually over that decade. Changes made to the sport by the late 1960s brought an end to the "strictly stock" vehicles of the 1950s.

=== Qualifying ===
| Grid | No. | Driver | Manufacturer | Owner |
|---|---|---|---|---|
| 1 | 43 | Richard Petty | '64 Plymouth | Petty Enterprises |
| 2 | 25 | Paul Goldsmith | '64 Plymouth | Ray Nichels |
| 3 | 1 | Billy Wade | '64 Mercury | Bud Moore |
| 4 | 21 | Marvin Panch | '64 Ford | Wood Brothers |
| 5 | 11 | Ned Jarrett | '64 Ford | Bondy Long |
| 6 | 6 | David Pearson | '64 Dodge | Cotton Owens |
| 7 | 27 | Junior Johnson | '64 Ford | Banjo Matthews |
| 8 | 28 | Fred Lorenzen | '64 Ford | Holman-Moody Racing |
| 9 | 26 | Bobby Isaac | '64 Dodge | Ray Nichels |
| 10 | 16 | Darel Dieringer | '64 Mercury | Bud Moore |
| 11 | 41 | Jim Paschal | '64 Plymouth | Petty Enterprises |
| 12 | 3 | Buck Baker | '64 Dodge | Ray Fox |
| 13 | 03 | LeeRoy Yarbrough | '64 Dodge | Ray Fox |
| 14 | 5 | Earl Balmer | '64 Dodge | Cotton Owens |
| 15 | 19 | Larry Thomas | '64 Ford | Herman Beam |
| 16 | 82 | Bunkie Blackburn | '64 Pontiac | Casper Hensley |
| 17 | 54 | Jimmy Pardue | '64 Plymouth | Charles Robinson |
| 18 | 78 | Buddy Arrington | '63 Dodge | Buddy Arrington |
| 19 | 34 | Wendell Scott | '63 Ford | Wendell Scott |
| 20 | 09 | Roy Mayne | '62 Chevrolet | Bob Adams |

=== Top 10 finishers ===
| Pos | Grid | No. | Driver | Manufacturer | Laps | Winnings | Laps led | Time/Status |
|---|---|---|---|---|---|---|---|---|
| 1 | 8 | 28 | Fred Lorenzen | '64 Ford | 500 | $4,185 | 1 | 3:12:12 |
| 2 | 1 | 43 | Richard Petty | '64 Plymouth | 499 | $2,730 | 442 | Missing rear end |
| 3 | 11 | 41 | Jim Paschal | '64 Plymouth | 499 | $1,500 | 0 | +1 lap |
| 4 | 13 | 03 | LeeRoy Yarbrough | '64 Dodge | 489 | $1,260 | 0 | +11 laps |
| 5 | 15 | 19 | Larry Thomas | '64 Ford | 482 | $975 | 0 | +18 laps |
| 6 | 17 | 54 | Jimmy Pardue | '64 Plymouth | 479 | $825 | 0 | +21 laps |
| 7 | 4 | 21 | Marvin Panch | '64 Ford | 463 | $775 | 0 | Missing rear end |
| 8 | 20 | 09 | Roy Mayne | '62 Chevrolet | 461 | $650 | 0 | +39 laps |
| 9 | 18 | 78 | Buddy Arrington | '63 Dodge | 455 | $550 | 0 | Missing rear end |
| 10 | 22 | 46 | J.T. Putney | '62 Chevrolet | 449 | $500 | 0 | +51 laps |

== Timeline ==
Section reference:

- Start of race: Paul Goldsmith started the race with the pole position.
- Lap 1: Fuel pressure issues forced Darrell Bryant off the track.
- Lap 2: Johnny Nave managed to overheat his vehicle, Jimmy Helms's vehicle had fuel pressure issues.
- Lap 4: Curtis Crider's vehicle had clutch issues, Roy Tyner's vehicle had a faulty valve.
- Lap 9: Doug Cooper had problems handling his vehicle, transmission issues ended E.J. Trivette's day on the track.
- Lap 10: Earl Brooks had problems dealing with his vehicle's transmission.
- Lap 13: Richard Petty takes over the lead from Paul Goldsmith.
- Lap 15: Oil pressure issues forced Jack Anderson out of the race.
- Lap 41: Wendell Scott's day at the track would end due to oil pressure issues.
- Lap 42: Darel Dieringer had engine problems, ending his racing weekend too soon.
- Lap 62: Ned Jarrett managed to overheat his vehicle while racing.
- Lap 70: Problems with the engine made Bunkie Blackburn end his racing weekend a bit too early.
- Lap 74: Bobby Isaac managed to ruin his vehicle's transmission while he was racing.
- Lap 77: Engine issues forced Billy Wade out of the race.
- Lap 145: Caution due to oil on track, green flag racing resumed on lap 158.
- Lap 148: Paul Goldsmith's transmission problems ended his day on the track.
- Lap 284: Doug Wilson managed to lose the rear end of the vehicle, was sidelined due to safety reasons.
- Lap 306: Junior Johnson takes over the lead from Richard Petty.
- Lap 309: Buck Baker managed to overheat his vehicle, which ended his shot at winning the race.
- Lap 351: Richard Petty takes over the lead from Junior Johnson.
- Lap 352: Junior Johnson's day on the track would be finished due to a blown engine.
- Lap 363: David Pearson managed to lose the rear end of his vehicle, was called off the track due to safety reasons.
- Lap 420: Earl Balmer wasn't able to finish because the rear end of his vehicle gave out.
- Lap 455: Buddy Arrington lost the rear end of his racing vehicle.
- Lap 463: Marvin Panch lost the rear end of his vehicle while he was racing.
- Lap 499: Richard Petty managed to destroy the rear end of his vehicle, forcing him to accept a respectable second-place finish.
- Lap 500: Fred Lorenzen takes over the lead from Richard Petty.
- Finish: Fred Lorenzen was officially declared the winner of the event.

| Preceded by 1964 Pennsylvania 200 | NASCAR Grand National Series Season; 1964 | Succeeded by 1964 Nashville 400 |
