= Mount Zion High School (Clayton County, Georgia) =

Public secondary school in Clayton County, Georgia, United States

Location
- 2535 Mount Zion Pkwy; Jonesboro, Georgia 30236; United States; 33.5545°N 84.3105°W

Information
- Type: Public secondary
- Established: 1990
- School district: Clayton County Public Schools
- Principal: Kimberly Grant
- Teaching staff: 69.00 (FTE)
- Grades: 9–12
- Enrollment: 1,174 (2023–2024)
- Student to teacher ratio: 17.01
- Campus: Suburban
- Colors: Red and Black
- Mascot: Mighty Bulldogs
- Website: Homepage

Mount Zion High School is a secondary school in unincorporated Clayton County, Georgia, United States, with a Jonesboro postal address. It is a part of Clayton County Public Schools.

== Notable alumni ==
- Terrence Woodyard (2001), basketball player
- Maurice Leggett, (2004), Canadian football player, also played for the Kansas City Chiefs in the NFL
