= Johnny Nave =

Racecar driver from Georgia

Jonathan "Johnny" Nave
- Born: unknown Jonesboro, Georgia, United States

NASCAR Cup Series career
- 4 races run over 3 years
- Best finish: 132nd – 1962 NASCAR Grand National Series season
- First race: 1958 untitled race at Orange Speedway
- Last race: 1964 Volunteer 500 (Bristol International Speedway)
Wins	Top tens	Poles
0	0	0

Jonathan Nave is a former NASCAR Grand National Series driver who has raced in 242 laps - the equivalent of 171.0 miles or 275.2 kilometres – while earning a grand total of $520 ($5,398.07 when adjusted for inflation).

== Career ==
Nave would suffer from a 15th-place finish after the end of an untitled race in 1958 involving only 18 drivers; including Buck Baker, Marvin Panch, and Speedy Thompson.

His average starting position was 25th while his average finishing position was 28th. Nave's primary vehicle is the #39 Ford machine; although he made use of the numbers #561 and #79 from time to time. Racing vehicles were either owned by himself or by Robert Ramey.
