= Morrow High School (Georgia) =

Public secondary school in Ellenwood, Georgia, United States

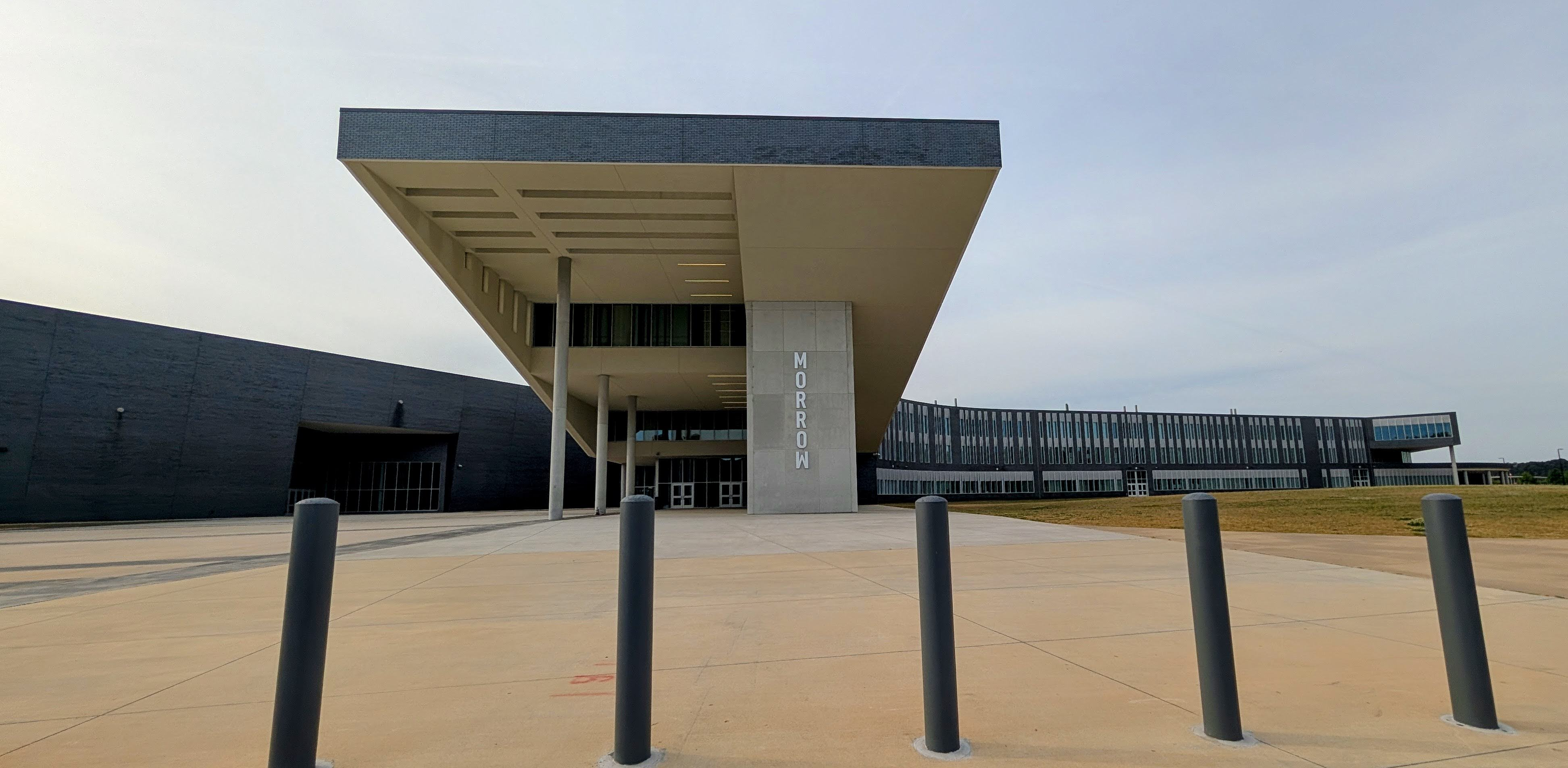

Location
- 4930 Steele Road; Ellenwood, Georgia 30294; United States; 33.5932°N 84.3147°W

Information
- Type: Public secondary
- Motto: Excellence without Excuses! / Failure is not an option!
- Established: 1969
- Category: School
- Principal: Lawvigneaud Harrell
- Teaching staff: 99.00 (FTE)
- Grades: 9–12
- Enrollment: 1,984 (2023–2024)
- Student to teacher ratio: 20.04
- Campus: Suburban
- Colors: Green and gold
- Mascot: Mustang
- Website: Morrow High School

Morrow High School is a secondary school in unincorporated Clayton County, Georgia, United States. Part of Clayton County Public Schools; it is located at 4930 Steele Road and has an Ellenwood post office address. The school's teams are known as the Mustangs. Middle schools generally associated with Morrow High are Morrow Middle School, Adamson Middle School and Rex Mill Middle School.

In 2022, the new Morrow High School $80 million campus was recently completed just east of the current location with the new Steele Road Stadium and basketball arena named A.C. McCullers Gymnasium. Coach McCullers who is best known for his 27-year tenure as the head basketball coach at Morrow High. It is the largest and most expensive school built in Clayton County.

The school's attendance boundary includes: eastern Morrow, Rex, and parts of Ellenwood in Clayton County.

== Notable alumni ==
- Bob the Drag Queen - winner of season 8 of Rupauls Drag Race; Class of ‘04
- Jeb Flesch - former professional football player
- Andre Hastings - former professional football player for the Pittsburgh Steelers and New Orleans Saints; Class of '90
- Jamal Hill - professional football player for the Houston Texans
- Karin Slaughter - crime writer; debuted with her novel Blindsighted
