= Jeb Flesch =

American football player (born 1969)

Profile
- Position: Offensive guard

Personal information
- Born: February 21, 1969 (age 57)
- Listed height: 6 ft 3 in (1.91 m)
- Listed weight: 270 lb (122 kg)

Career information
- High school: Morrow (Morrow, Georgia)
- College: Clemson
- NFL draft: 1992: undrafted

Career history
- Seattle Seahawks (1992)*
- * Offseason or practice squad member only

Awards and highlights
- Consensus All-American (1991); First-team All-ACC (1991); 2× Second-team All-ACC (1989, 1990)

Jeb Flesch (born February 21, 1969) is an American former college football offensive guard who played for the Clemson Tigers. He was a consensus All-American in 1991.

== Early life ==
Jeb Flesch was born on February 21, 1969. He attended Morrow High School in Morrow, Georgia.

== College career ==
Flesch played college football for the Clemson Tigers of Clemson University. He was a four-year letterman from 1988 to 1991. He led the team in knockdown blocks with 72 in 1991 while also helping Clemson lead the ACC in total offense. He was named a consensus All-American for his performance during the 1991 season. Flesch was also named first-team All-ACC in 1991. He started 45 games, of all which were consecutive, during his college career. His 45 starts were the second most of any offensive lineman in school history. Flesch was the second Clemson lineman to earn consensus All-American honors, the first being Harry Olszewski in 1967. Flesch was inducted into Clemson's athletics hall of fame in 2016.

== Professional career ==
Flesch signed with the Seattle Seahawks on May 5, 1992, after going undrafted in the 1992 NFL draft. On August 9, 1992, it was reported that he had been released.

== Personal life ==
Flesch later became an assistant general manager at a hotel in Myrtle Beach, South Carolina.
