= Andre Hastings =

American football player (born 1971)

No. 88
- Position: Wide receiver

Personal information
- Born: November 7, 1970 (age 55); Macon, Georgia, U.S.
- Listed height: 6 ft 1 in (1.85 m)
- Listed weight: 190 lb (86 kg)

Career information
- High school: Morrow (GA)
- College: Georgia
- NFL draft: 1993: 3rd round, 76th overall pick

Career history
- Pittsburgh Steelers (1993–1996); New Orleans Saints (1997–1999); Tampa Bay Buccaneers (2000)

Awards and highlights
- First-team All-SEC (1992); Second-team All-SEC (1991)

Career NFL statistics
- Receptions: 266
- Receiving yards: 3,307
- Receiving touchdowns: 18
- Stats at Pro Football Reference

Andre Orlando Hastings (born November 7, 1971) is an American former professional football player who was a wide receiver in the National Football League (NFL). He was selected by the Pittsburgh Steelers in the third round of the 1993 NFL draft. Standing at 6'1" and 190 lb (86 kg) from the University of Georgia, Hastings played in eight NFL seasons from 1993 to 2000 for the Pittsburgh Steelers, New Orleans Saints, and the Tampa Bay Buccaneers. Hastings's biggest highlight of his career came during Super Bowl XXX when he caught 10 passes for 98 yards and returned 2 punts for 18 yards for the Steelers versus the Dallas Cowboys. He attended Morrow High School in Georgia.
