= Jamal Hill (American football) =

American football player (born 2001)

No. 54 – Jacksonville Jaguars
- Position: Linebacker
- Roster status: Practice squad

Personal information
- Born: April 4, 2001 (age 25); Rex, Georgia, U.S.
- Listed height: 6 ft 0 in (1.83 m)
- Listed weight: 227 lb (103 kg)

Career information
- High school: Morrow (Ellenwood, Georgia)
- College: Oregon (2019–2023)
- NFL draft: 2024: 6th round, 188th overall pick

Career history
- Houston Texans (2024–2026); Jacksonville Jaguars (2026–present)*
- * Offseason or practice squad member only

Career NFL statistics as of 2026
- Tackles: 14
- Forced fumbles: 1
- Stats at Pro Football Reference

Jamal Hill (born April 4, 2001) is an American professional football linebacker for the Jacksonville Jaguars of the National Football League (NFL). He played college football for the Oregon Ducks and was selected by the Texans in the sixth round of the 2024 NFL draft.

== Early life ==
Hill was born on April 4, 2001, and grew up in Rex, Georgia. He was raised by his mother after his father died when Hill was five years old. He attended Morrow High School where he won three varsity letters on the football team while playing safety. He was chosen first-team all-region both as a junior and senior and also was an all-county choice. He committed to play college football for the Oregon Ducks, having been ranked a three-star recruit, the 38th-best safety nationally and the 44th-best player in the state.

== College career ==
Hill played mainly on special teams as a true freshman at Oregon in 2019, totaling six tackles. He then started all six games in 2020, recording 20 tackles, four pass breakups and two interceptions; both of his interceptions came in the Ducks' Pac-12 Conference championship game win against USC, and he was named the conference player of the week for his performance. He was chosen an honorable mention All-Pac 12 choice on the year. Hill appeared in 13 games in 2021, starting seven, and finished with 38 tackles, four pass breakups and a forced fumble. In 2022, he started nine games while appearing in all 13 and had 50 tackles, three pass breakups and a forced fumble.

Hill moved from being a safety to an inside linebacker in the 2023 season, having a sack and a forced fumble in his first start at the position. He played in all 14 games in 2023, starting seven, and recorded 31 tackles, five tackles-for-loss (TFLs), two forced fumbles and two sacks. He ended his collegiate career with 145 tackles, 15 pass breakups, four forced fumbles and two interceptions, while having started 29 of the 60 games in which he appeared.

== Professional career ==
Pre-draft measurables
Height	Weight	Arm length	Hand span	Wingspan	40-yard dash	10-yard split	20-yard split	20-yard shuttle	Three-cone drill	Vertical jump	Broad jump	Bench press
6 ft 0 in (1.83 m)	216 lb (98 kg)	32 3/8 in (0.82 m)	8 3/4 in (0.22 m)	6 ft 6 3/4 in (2.00 m)	4.45 s	1.61 s	2.60 s	4.42 s	7.16 s	33.0 in (0.84 m)	10 ft 1 in (3.07 m)	17 reps
All values from Pro Day

=== Houston Texans ===
Hill was selected in the sixth round (188th overall) of the 2024 NFL draft by the Houston Texans. He made eight appearances for Houston during his rookie campaign, recording four combined tackles. During the 2025 season, Hill compiled six tackles and one forced fumble across 12 appearances for the Texans.

On June 3, 2026, it was reported that Hill had undergone offseason surgery to repair a ligament in his wrist. Hill was waived by Houston on August 30 as a part of final roster cuts; he was re-signed to the team's practice squad the next day. He was promoted to the active roster on September 16. He was waived on October 20.

=== Jacksonville Jaguars ===
On October 22, 2026, Hill was signed to the Jacksonville Jaguars practice squad.
