= Jonesboro, Georgia =

- City
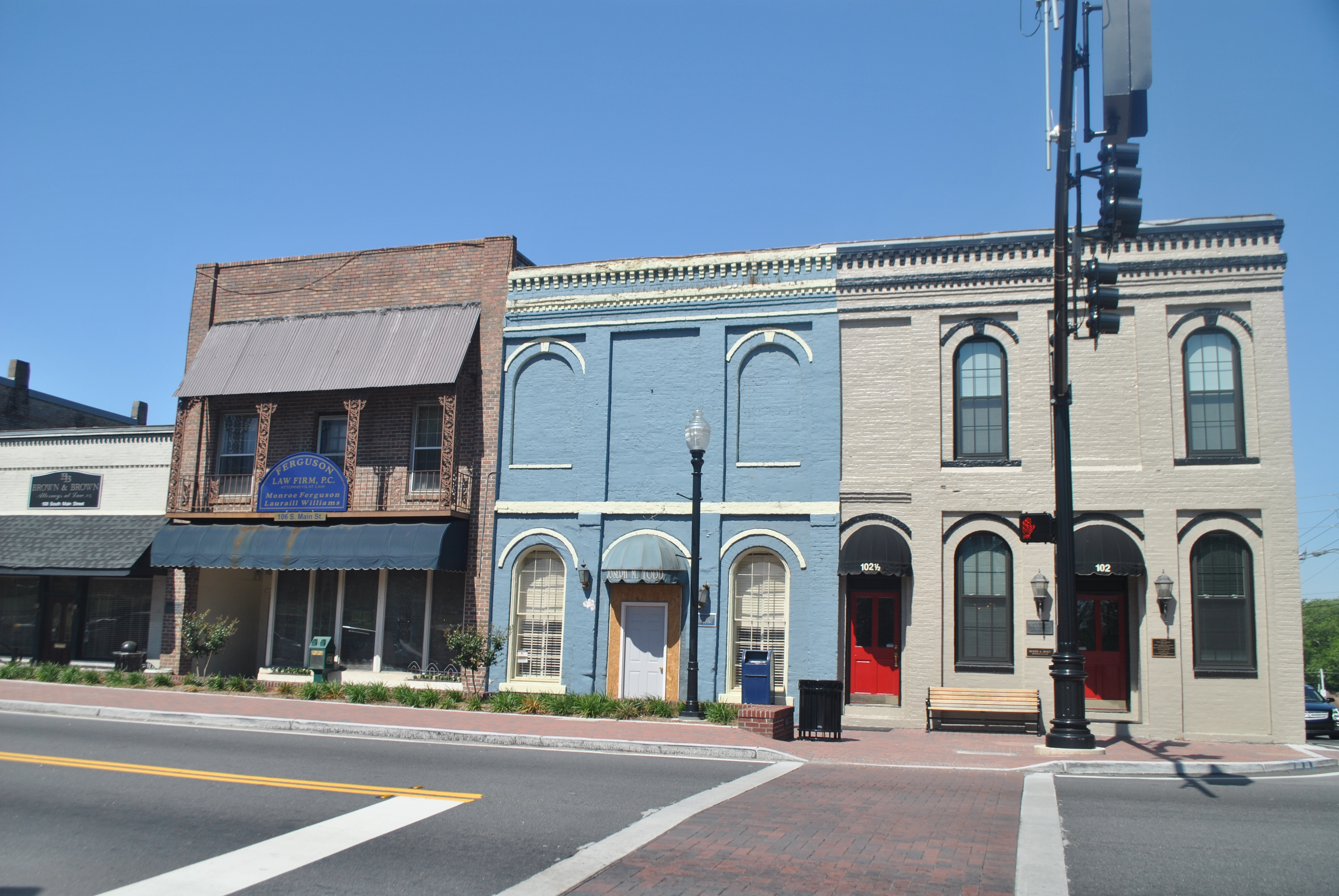
- Buildings in the Jonesboro Historic District

- Flag Seal Logo

- Location in Clayton County and the state of Georgia

- Location of Jonesboro in Metro Atlanta
- Coordinates: 33°31′28″N 84°21′15″W
- Country: United States
- State: Georgia
- County: Clayton

Government
  - Mayor: Donya Sartor

Area
  - Total: 3.00 sq mi (7.76 km^{2})
  - Land: 2.98 sq mi (7.71 km^{2})
  - Water: 0.019 sq mi (0.05 km^{2})
- Elevation: 920 ft (280 m)

Population (2020)
  - Total: 4,235
  - Density: 1,422.3/sq mi (549.16/km^{2})
- Time zone: UTC-5 (Eastern (EST))
  - Summer (DST): UTC-4 (EDT)
- ZIP codes: 30236-30238
- Area codes: 770/678/470
- FIPS code: 13-42604
- GNIS feature ID: 0332118
- Website: jonesboroga.com

Jonesboro (/ˈdʒoʊnzbʌrə/) is a city in and the county seat of Clayton County, Georgia, United States. The population was 4,235 in 2020.

The city's name was originally spelled Jonesborough. During the American Civil War, the final skirmish in the Atlanta campaign was fought here south of Atlanta, cutting off the city and forcing the mayor of Atlanta to surrender at Marietta in early September 1864. The final fall of Atlanta in the Battle of Jonesborough ended up being a decisive point in the nation's history, propelling Abraham Lincoln to re-election two months later, and continuing the war until the Confederacy finally surrendered the following year.

== History ==
Jonesboro was inhabited by settlers as early as 1821, as a result of the Treaty of Indian Springs, and it was founded as Leaksville in 1823. In 1825, the Flint River Baptist Church was erected on a hill in Leaksville. After the Macon and Western Railroad arrived into the area in 1846, the town was renamed to Jonesboro, in order to honor railroad official Samuel Goode Jones (father of Thomas G. Jones), who was also honored by its citizens. Jonesboro was incorporated over three decades later, in 1859.

Jonesboro hosted the beach volleyball at the 1996 Summer Olympics with the artificial beach created at Clayton County International Park. Jonesboro elected its first Black Mayor, Dr. Sonya Sartor, in March 2023.

In 2024, an investigation by the "FOX 5 I-Team" in Atlanta discovered that hundreds of traffic tickets had been issued improperly by robotic traffic control cameras in school zones. The city was compelled to issue refunds and an apology.

== Geography ==
Jonesboro is located at 33°31′28″N 84°21′15″W (33.524512, −84.354290).

According to the United States Census Bureau, the city has a total area of 2.6 square miles (6.7 km^{2}), of which 2.6 square miles (6.7 km^{2}) is land and 0.1 square miles (0.26 km^{2}) (1.89%) is water.

The railroad through Jonesboro is built on the Eastern Continental Divide and there are no bridges for the tracks for many miles in either direction.

=== Climate ===
Climate data for Jonesboro, Georgia, 1991–2020 normals, extremes 1994–present
Month	Jan	Feb	Mar	Apr	May	Jun	Jul	Aug	Sep	Oct	Nov	Dec	Year
Record high °F (°C)	77 (25)	81 (27)	89 (32)	92 (33)	95 (35)	103 (39)	104 (40)	104 (40)	99 (37)	98 (37)	86 (30)	78 (26)	104 (40)
Mean maximum °F (°C)	69.7 (20.9)	73.6 (23.1)	80.7 (27.1)	85.3 (29.6)	90.4 (32.4)	95.9 (35.5)	96.1 (35.6)	95.9 (35.5)	92.5 (33.6)	82.8 (28.2)	76.8 (24.9)	72.6 (22.6)	97.7 (36.5)
Mean daily maximum °F (°C)	52.7 (11.5)	56.5 (13.6)	64.7 (18.2)	73.0 (22.8)	80.5 (26.9)	86.7 (30.4)	89.6 (32.0)	88.6 (31.4)	83.2 (28.4)	73.4 (23.0)	62.4 (16.9)	54.7 (12.6)	72.2 (22.3)
Daily mean °F (°C)	42.5 (5.8)	45.9 (7.7)	53.3 (11.8)	61.0 (16.1)	69.7 (20.9)	76.6 (24.8)	79.8 (26.6)	78.8 (26.0)	73.3 (22.9)	62.5 (16.9)	51.7 (10.9)	45.1 (7.3)	61.7 (16.5)
Mean daily minimum °F (°C)	32.3 (0.2)	35.3 (1.8)	41.8 (5.4)	49.1 (9.5)	58.8 (14.9)	66.5 (19.2)	70.0 (21.1)	69.0 (20.6)	63.3 (17.4)	51.6 (10.9)	40.9 (4.9)	35.4 (1.9)	51.2 (10.7)
Mean minimum °F (°C)	17.1 (−8.3)	22.3 (−5.4)	28.6 (−1.9)	36.3 (2.4)	45.9 (7.7)	58.2 (14.6)	63.4 (17.4)	63.5 (17.5)	53.1 (11.7)	37.1 (2.8)	27.7 (−2.4)	24.0 (−4.4)	15.9 (−8.9)
Record low °F (°C)	5 (−15)	6 (−14)	14 (−10)	29 (−2)	37 (3)	50 (10)	52 (11)	57 (14)	42 (6)	29 (−2)	19 (−7)	7 (−14)	5 (−15)
Average precipitation inches (mm)	5.02 (128)	4.86 (123)	4.95 (126)	4.19 (106)	3.47 (88)	4.59 (117)	5.09 (129)	4.42 (112)	3.56 (90)	3.62 (92)	4.19 (106)	4.96 (126)	52.92 (1,343)
Average snowfall inches (cm)	0.5 (1.3)	0.0 (0.0)	0.1 (0.25)	0.0 (0.0)	0.0 (0.0)	0.0 (0.0)	0.0 (0.0)	0.0 (0.0)	0.0 (0.0)	0.0 (0.0)	0.0 (0.0)	0.2 (0.51)	0.8 (2.06)
Average precipitation days (≥ 0.01 in)	10.5	10.6	9.7	8.5	8.3	10.8	11.2	10.2	7.9	6.8	8.2	10.4	113.1
Average snowy days (≥ 0.1 in)	0.3	0.0	0.0	0.0	0.0	0.0	0.0	0.0	0.0	0.0	0.0	0.1	0.4
Source 1: NOAA
Source 2: National Weather Service (mean maxima/minima 2006–2020)

== Demographics ==
Historical population
Census	Pop.	Note	%±
1870	531		—
1880	1,048		97.4%
1890	803		−23.4%
1900	877		9.2%
1910	970		10.6%
1920	1,060		9.3%
1930	1,065		0.5%
1940	1,204		13.1%
1950	1,741		44.6%
1960	3,014		73.1%
1970	4,105		36.2%
1980	4,132		0.7%
1990	3,635		−12.0%
2000	3,829		5.3%
2010	4,724		23.4%
2020	4,235		−10.4%
2025 (est.)	6,046	▲	42.8%
U.S. Decennial Census; 2000 2025

=== Racial and ethnic composition ===
Jonesboro city, Georgia – Racial and ethnic composition Note: the US Census treats Hispanic/Latino as an ethnic category. This table excludes Latinos from the racial categories and assigns them to a separate category. Hispanics/Latinos may be of any race.
Race / Ethnicity (NH = Non-Hispanic)	Pop 2000	Pop 2010	Pop 2020	% 2000	% 2010	% 2020
White alone (NH)	2,279	1,483	1,126	59.52%	31.39%	26.59%
Black or African American alone (NH)	1,161	2,712	2,247	30.32%	57.41%	53.06%
Native American or Alaska Native alone (NH)	8	2	6	0.21%	0.04%	0.14%
Asian alone (NH)	23	101	124	0.60%	2.14%	2.93%
Native Hawaiian or Pacific Islander alone (NH)	12	1	3	0.31%	0.02%	0.07%
Other race alone (NH)	5	5	6	0.13%	0.11%	0.14%
Mixed race or Multiracial (NH)	52	79	140	1.36%	1.67%	3.31%
Hispanic or Latino (any race)	289	341	583	7.55%	7.22%	13.77%
Total	3,829	4,724	4,235	100.00%	100.00%	100.00%

=== 2020 census ===
As of the 2020 census, Jonesboro had a population of 4,235. There were 1,476 households and 771 families residing in the city.

The median age was 34.5 years. 26.4% of residents were under the age of 18 and 11.8% of residents were 65 years of age or older. For every 100 females there were 101.8 males, and for every 100 females age 18 and over there were 100.9 males age 18 and over.

100.0% of residents lived in urban areas, while 0.0% lived in rural areas.

Of the 1,476 households in Jonesboro, 39.3% had children under the age of 18 living in them. Of all households, 25.3% were married-couple households, 21.5% were households with a male householder and no spouse or partner present, and 47.4% were households with a female householder and no spouse or partner present. About 28.4% of all households were made up of individuals and 8.0% had someone living alone who was 65 years of age or older.

There were 1,628 housing units, of which 9.3% were vacant. The homeowner vacancy rate was 4.3% and the rental vacancy rate was 6.3%.

== Government and infrastructure ==
The Clayton County Police Department operates the Precinct 4 office in Jonesboro. The headquarters of the police department, C. Crandle Bray Building, is in an unincorporated area and has a Jonesboro postal address.

=== Transit systems ===
MARTA and Xpress GA/Georgia RTA buses serve the city.

== Movies and literature ==
Many of the scenes from the 1977 film Smokey and the Bandit were filmed in Jonesboro. Another 1977 movie, the obscure 'In Hot Pursuit (aka The Polk County Pot Plane), was filmed in and around Jonesboro.

Tara, the fictional plantation in Margaret Mitchell's novel Gone with the Wind was supposed to be located approximately five miles outside of Jonesboro, the closest town.

"We Are Marshall" was briefly filmed at Tara Stadium in Jonesboro. The stadium was changed from green to light blue and light yellow for the scene.

Lynyrd Skynyrd's album cover was photographed near the corner of Mill and Main streets.

== Landmarks ==
- Rural Home (now demolished)
- Stately Oaks

== Education ==
=== K-12 education ===
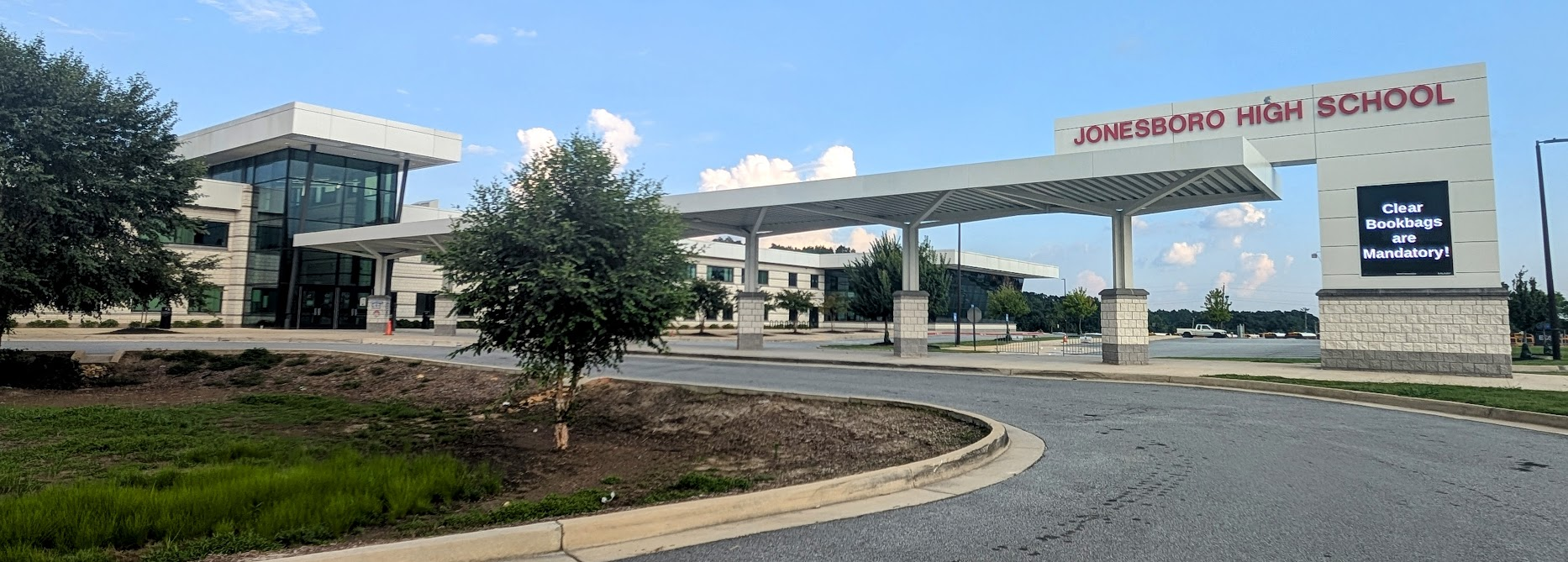
Jonesboro High School (near the city limits, and the zoned high school of most of the city)

Clayton County Public Schools operates public schools.

School zoning is as follows: Schools in the city limits include Arnold, Lee Street, and Suder elementary schools, as well as Jonesboro Middle School. E. J. Swint Elementary School has a Jonesboro address but is not in the city limits. It does not cover residential portions of the city.

Much of the city is zoned to Jonesboro Middle School. Parts of the city are zoned to Mundy's Mill Middle School, which is outside of the city limits but has a Jonesboro address.

Jonesboro High School is outside of the city limits, but is the zoned high school for the vast majority of the residential areas of the Jonesboro city limits. Some residential areas of the Jonesboro city limits, those west of U.S. Highway 41, are zoned to Mundy's Mill High School, which has a Jonesboro post office address but is not in the city limits.

Elite Scholars Academy, a 6-12 magnet school, has a Jonesboro post office address, but is outside of the city limits. Mount Zion High School also has a Jonesboro address, but is not in the city limits.

=== Public libraries ===
Clayton County Library System has the Headquarters Library north of the city limits; it has a Jonesboro post office address.

== Parks and recreation ==
The county-operated J. Charlie Griswell Senior Center is east of the city limits and has a Jonesboro postal address. The Aging Program Office/Kinship Care Resource Center is north of the city limits and has a Jonesboro postal address.

== Notable people ==
- Dan T. Cathy (born 1953), CEO of Chick-fil-A
- Tashard Choice (born 1984), former running back in National Football League
- Harry Douglas, former NFL wide receiver
- Toney Douglas (born 1986), basketball player in the Israeli Basketball Premier League
- Jesse Fuller, Afro-American blues musician
- Sister Mary Melanie Holliday, Catholic nun
- Garrett Liberty, racing driver
- Steve Lundquist (born 1961), two-time gold medal swimmer in 1984 Olympics
- Johnny Nave, racing driver
- Chidi "Chi Chi" Osondu, Nigerian-American record producer and songwriter
- Thomas Milton Rivers, bacteriologist and virologist with the Rockefeller Institute, Rear Admiral of the U.S. Navy
- Adam Smith (born 1992), basketball player for Hapoel Holon in the Israeli Basketball Premier League
- Annie Fitzgerald Stephens, landowner and businesswoman, grandmother of Margaret Mitchell
- Cameron Sutton, cornerback for the Detroit Lions
- M. J. Walker (born 1998), shooting guard for Florida State
