= Clayton County Public Schools =

School district in Georgia (U.S. state)

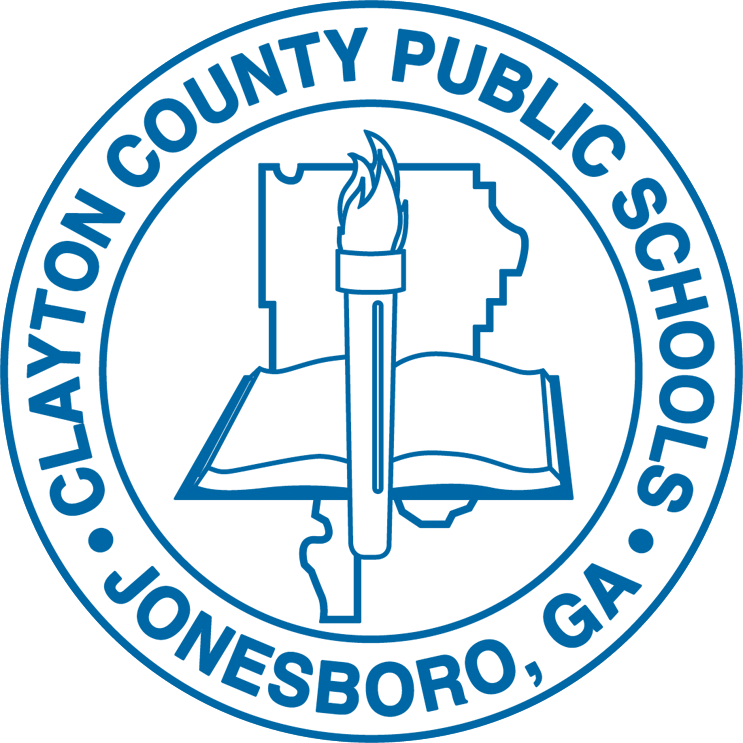

Address
- 1058 Fifth Avenue Jonesboro, Georgia, 30236; United States
- Coordinates: 33°32′11″N 84°21′26″W

District information
- Type: Public
- Grades: Pre-kindergarten – 12
- Superintendent: Douglas Hendrix Sr.
- Chair of the board: Benjamin Straker, Sr. (District 9)
- Accreditations: Southern Association of Colleges and Schools; Cognia (education)
- Budget: $1,514,097,197 (2026)
- NCES District ID: 1301230

Students and staff
- Students: 51,055 (2024–25)
- Teachers: 3,446.10 (FTE)
- Student–teacher ratio: 14.82

Other information
- Website: clayton.k12.ga.us

The Clayton County Public School District (CCPS) is a public school district headquartered in Jonesboro, Georgia. It administers schools inside of Clayton County, Georgia, and covers the whole county. Serving more than 52,000 students, Clayton County Public Schools is ranked among the 100 largest school districts in the United States and is the sixth-largest school system in Georgia.

The system has 39 primary/elementary schools (including one public charter), 17 middle schools (including one public charter), 12 high schools, one alternative education center, one psychological education center, and one multi-purpose education center. Included in this number are five school-wide magnet schools, 12 magnet programs, one state-certified STEM program, one Cognia (AdvancED) certified STEM program, and two International Baccalaureate Candidate schools.

The majority of Clayton County's students are African American and Hispanic. However, there is also a diverse minority with 90 different ethnicities and countries represented.

Based the National Center for Education Statistics, 20.0% of CCPS students live in families making income below the poverty line, and 42% live with single parents.

As of the 2019–2020 school year, over 12,000 students speak a language other than English and over 6,000 are counted as English language learners. Spanish and Vietnamese are the two most spoken languages besides English.

== Loss of accreditation ==
On August 28, 2008 the Southern Association of Colleges and Schools (SACS) revoked accreditation for the Clayton County School District. Clayton County Public Schools is the third school district in the United States to lose accreditation since 1969. Clayton County Public Schools regained accreditation status in 2009 on a probationary status eight months after the revocation of the school district's accreditation.

== Board of education ==
As of 2026, the members of the Clayton County Public School board of education are:

- Jasmine Bowles (District 1)
- Mark Christmas (District 2)
- Jessie Goree (District 3),
- Victoria Williams (District 4)
- Deatrice "Dee" Haney (District 5)
- Mary Baker (District 6), board vice-chair
- Sabrina Hill (District 7)
- Joy Tellis-Cooper (District 8)
- Benjamin Straker (District 9), board chair

== Superintendents ==
Dr. Douglas Hendrix has been the interim superintendent of Clayton County Public Schools since February 2, 2026. He was appointed by the board of education on to be interim superintendent, to succeed Dr. Anthony Smith, who stepped down from the position early. Hendrix was previously the Senior Deputy Superintendent and Chief of Staff for the school district.

List of superintendents:

- Ernest Stroud (1970–1986)
- Joe Lovin (1987–1989)
- Bob Livingston (1990–1994)
- Joe Hairston (1995–2000)
- Dan Colwell (2000–2003)
- William Chavis (interim, 2003-2004)
- Barbara Pulliam (2004-2007)
- John W. Thompson (2008-2009) Vayla S. Lee (interim; 2009)
- Edmond Heatley (2009-2012)
- Luvenia Jackson (2012-2017)
- Morcease Beasley (2017-2022)
- Anthony W. Smith (2022-2026)
- Douglas Hendrix, Sr (interim 2026-Present)

== Schools ==
=== High schools ===
These high schools are located in Clayton County.

School	Mascot	Year opened	Principal	School Choice & Program Offerings	Ref
Charles Drew High School	Titans	2009	Tangela Benjamin	Medical Sciences Magnet	
Elite Scholars Academy	Knights	2009	Sam West	Advanced Placement; Dual enrollment; Early College; Cambridge Assessment International Education	
Forest Park High School	Panthers	1962	Kim Dancy	Advanced Placement; Dual Enrollment; AP Capstone	
Jonesboro High School	Cardinals	1963	Tenisha Bailey	Political Leadership Magnet; International Baccalaureate (Seeking Candidacy-2022)	
Lovejoy High School	Wildcats	1989	Kareem Sanders	Mathematics and Computer Science Magnet	
Martha Ellen Stilwell School of the Arts	Stallions	2015	Brenda Ross-Wilson	Visual and Performing Arts Magnet (Dance, Music: Band, Guitar, Piano, Orchestra, Vocal, Theatre)	
Morrow High School	Mustangs	1970	Lawvigneaud Harrell	Science, Technology and Mathematics Magnet; AP Capstone	
Mount Zion High School	Bulldogs	1990	Kimberly Grant	Advanced Placement; Dual Enrollment	
Mundy's Mill High School	Tigers	2002	Sheadric Barbra	Film & Media Magnet	
North Clayton High School	Eagles	1967	James Scarborough	Advanced Placement; Dual Enrollment; Early College- Aviation	
Perry Career Academy	TBD	TBD	Terry Young	Advanced Placement; Dual Enrollment	
Riverdale High School	Raiders	1977	Sharon Wilson	Advanced Placement; Dual Enrollment; Advantage Academy (Business Administration)	

=== Middle schools ===
These middle schools are located in Clayton County.

School	Mascot	Principal	School Choice & Program Offerings	Ref
Adamson Middle School	Indians	Adrian Courtland	N/A	
Babb Middle School	Bulldogs	Deborah Green	Media Arts	
Eddie White 6-8 Academy	Wolfpack	Micki Harris	N/A	
Elite Scholars Academy	Knights	Sam West	Early College- Advanced Learning; Cambridge Assessment International Education	
Forest Park Middle School	Panthers	Harold Dobbins	N/A	
Jonesboro Middle School	Bears	Kimberlee Barnett	International Baccalaureate (Seeking Candidacy-2020)	
Kendrick Middle School	Comets	Letitia Lewis	N/A	
M.D. Roberts Middle School	Rams	Lee Buddy	Visual and Performing Arts Magnet (Dance, Media Arts- Visual, Music: Band, Orchestra, Vocal, Theatre)	
Morrow Middle School	Bobcats	Christopher Robinson	Spanish Dual Language Magnet	
Mundy's Mill Middle School	Razorbacks	Jakarra Young	Media Arts Music Magnet	
North Clayton Middle School	Tigers	Shakeria Chaney	N/A	
Pointe South Middle School	Vikings	Malakia Wright	Theatre	
Rex Mill Middle School	Yellow Jackets	Jarret Proctor	Science, Technology, Engineering, and Math (STEM)	
Riverdale Middle School	Spartans	Cedrick Coleman	N/A	
Sequoyah Middle School	Warriors	Jhamare Hartsfield	N/A	

=== Elementary schools ===
These elementary schools are located in Clayton County.

Schools	Mascot	Principal	School Choice & Program Offerings
Anderson Elementary School	Pirates	Tonia Luttery	Pre-Kindergarten
Arnold Elementary School	Eagles	Nicole Chapman	Cambridge Assessment International Education
Brown Elementary School	Bears	Joane McDonald	Science, Technology, Engineering, Arts and Math (STEAM)
Callaway Elementary School	Knights	Dawn Watkins	Pre-Kindergarten
Church Street Elementary School	Wildcats	Monica Goree	Pre-Kindergarten
East Clayton Elementary School	Cougars	Zakaria Watson	Pre-Kindergarten
Edmonds Elementary School	Tigers	Marques Strickland	Pre-Kindergarten
Fountain Elementary School	Rams	Stephanie Graffree	Pre-Kindergarten
Harper Elementary School	Hawks	Tara Davison	N/A
Hawthorne Elementary School	Hawks	Karisa Walker	Pre-Kindergarten
Haynie Elementary School	Hornets	Vanessa Muhammad	N/A
Huie Elementary School	Vikings	Arlando Dawson	Pre-Kindergarten
Jackson Elementary School	Jaguars	Angela Jenifer	Pre-Kindergarten
Kay Pace School of The Arts	Panthers	Lee Buddy	Visual and Performing Arts Magnet (Dance, Music- Instrumental, Music-Vocal, Theatre)
Kemp Elementary School	Koalas	Zsa Zsa Davis	N/A
Kemp Primary	Pandas	Johnnie Nauck	Pre-Kindergarten
Kilpatrick Elementary School	Cougars	Candice Jester	Spanish Dual Language Magnet
M.L. King Elementary School	Huskies	Carl Jackson	Pre-Kindergarten
Michelle Obama STEM Academy	Panther	Marcia Payton-Edwards	
Lake City Elementary School	Tigers	Malika Gonzales	Pre-Kindergarten
Lake Ridge Elementary School	Dolphins	Kelley Starks	Pre-Kindergarten; French Dual Language Magnet
Lee Street Elementary School	Eagles	Wendell Span	Pre-Kindergarten; International Baccalaureate Candidate
Marshall Elementary School	Eagles	Candice McBryde	N/A
McGarrah Elementary School	Wildcats	Lakeisha Sims	Pre-Kindergarten
Morrow Elementary School	Wildcats	Crystal Haines	Pre-Kindergarten
Mount Zion Elementary School	Lions	Tonishia Sullivan-Whitlow	Pre-Kindergarten
Mount Zion Primary	Lion Cubs	Enika Bryant	Pre-Kindergarten; Spanish Dual Language Magnet
Northcutt Elementary School	Eagles	Alex Davis	Pre-Kindergarten
Oliver Elementary School	Eagles	Millicent Crews	Pre-Kindergarten
Pointe South Elementary School	Mustangs	Roxanne Dixon	Pre-Kindergarten
Riverdale Elementary School	Rockets	Michael Faison	N/A
River's Edge Elementary School	Eagles	Dira Harris	Pre-Kindergarten; Chinese Dual Language Magnet
Smith Elementary School	Grey Timber Wolves	Scharbrenia Lockhart	N/A
Suder Elementary School	Wildcats	Lekisha Anderson	Pre-Kindergarten; Cambridge Assessment International Education
Swint Elementary School	Eagles	Sara Stephens	N/A
Tara Elementary School	Mustangs	Michael Thompson	Pre-Kindergarten
Unidos Dual Language School	Puma	Emma Brandy	Pre-Kindergarten; Spanish Dual Language Magnet
West Clayton Elementary School	Black Panther	Rochelle Harris	Pre-Kindergarten
