= 2024 South Alabama Jaguars football team =

American college football season

2024 South Alabama Jaguars football

Salute to Veterans Bowl champion

Salute to Veterans Bowl, W 30–23 vs. Western Michigan
- Conference: Sun Belt Conference
- West Division
- Record: 7–6 (5–3 Sun Belt)
- Head coach: Major Applewhite (1st season)
- Offensive coordinator: Rob Ezell (1st season)
- Offensive scheme: Multiple spread
- Defensive coordinator: Will Windham (1st season)
- Base defense: Multiple 4–2–5
- Home stadium: Hancock Whitney Stadium

2024 Sun Belt Conference football standings
	Conf.			Overall
Team	W		L	W		L
East Division
Marshall xy$	7	–	1	10	–	3
Georgia Southern	6	–	2	8	–	5
James Madison	4	–	4	9	–	4
Old Dominion	4	–	4	5	–	7
Coastal Carolina	3	–	5	6	–	7
Appalachian State	3	–	5	5	–	6
Georgia State	1	–	7	3	–	9
West Division
Louisiana xy	7	–	1	10	–	4
Texas State	5	–	3	8	–	5
Arkansas State	5	–	3	8	–	5
South Alabama	5	–	3	7	–	6
Louisiana–Monroe	3	–	5	5	–	7
Troy	3	–	5	4	–	8
Southern Miss	0	–	8	1	–	11
Championship: Marshall 31, Louisiana 3
$ – Conference champion; x – Division champion/co-champions; y – Championship game participant

The 2024 South Alabama Jaguars football team represented the University of South Alabama as a member of the Sun Belt Conference during the 2024 NCAA Division I FBS football season. They were led by first-year head coach Major Applewhite and played their home games at Hancock Whitney Stadium in Mobile, Alabama.

South Alabama head coach Kane Wommack was hired by Alabama as its defensive coordinator.

On September 12, 2024, South Alabama scored 87 points in a victory over Northwestern State, the most by any FBS team since 1991.

== Preseason ==
=== Media poll ===
In the Sun Belt preseason coaches' poll, the Jaguars were picked to finish fifth place in the West division.

Defensive back Jaden Voisin was awarded to be in the preseason All-Sun Belt first team defense, respectively. Wide receiver Jamaal Pritchett and defensive lineman Wy'Kevious Thomas were named to the second team offense and defense.

== Schedule ==
The football schedule was announced on March 1, 2024.

Date	Time	Opponent	Site	TV	Result	Attendance
August 31	4:00 p.m.	North Texas*	Hancock Whitney Stadium; Mobile, AL	ESPN+	L 38–52	15,559
September 7	5:00 p.m.	at Ohio*	Peden Stadium; Athens, OH	ESPN+	L 20–27	22,158
September 12	6:30 p.m.	Northwestern State*	Hancock Whitney Stadium; Mobile, AL	ESPN+	W 87–10	16,023
September 19	6:30 p.m.	at Appalachian State	Kidd Brewer Stadium; Boone, NC	ESPN	W 48–14	34,133
September 28	6:45 p.m.	at No. 14 LSU*	Tiger Stadium; Baton Rouge, LA	SECN	L 10–42	102,143
October 5	6:00 p.m.	at Arkansas State	Centennial Bank Stadium; Jonesboro, AR	ESPN+	L 16–18	21,427
October 15	6:30 p.m.	Troy	Hancock Whitney Stadium; Mobile, AL (rivalry)	ESPN2	W 25–9	25,450
October 26	4:00 p.m.	Louisiana–Monroe^{†}	Hancock Whitney Stadium; Mobile, AL	ESPN+	W 46–17	16,746
November 2	6:30 p.m.	Georgia Southern	Hancock Whitney Stadium; Mobile, AL	ESPNU	L 30–34	19,667
November 16	6:00 p.m.	at Louisiana	Cajun Field; Lafayette, LA	ESPN+	W 24–22	16,063
November 23	2:00 p.m.	at Southern Miss	M. M. Roberts Stadium; Hattiesburg, MS	ESPN+	W 35–14	20,074
November 29	2:30 p.m.	Texas State	Hancock Whitney Stadium; Mobile, AL	ESPN+	L 38–45	15,569
December 14	8:00 p.m.	vs. Western Michigan*	Cramton Bowl; Montgomery, AL (Salute to Veterans Bowl)	ESPN	W 30–23	12,021
*Non-conference game; ^{†}Homecoming; Rankings from AP Poll and CFP Rankings released prior to game; All times are in Central time

== Personnel ==
=== Transfers ===
Outgoing
Player	Position	New school
Gavin Forsha	LB	Withdrawn
Caullin Lacy	WR	Louisville
Nathan Rawlins-Kibonge	EDGE	Iowa Central CC
Christopher Davis Jr.	WR	Coahoma CC
Marquise Robinson	CB	Arkansas
Jaden Voisin	S	Withdrawn
Yam Banks	S	Ole Miss
James Robinson	IOL	Valdosta State
Travis Drosos	LS	UCLA
Dontae Lucas	IOL	Southern Miss
Eli Ntsasa	S	Western New Mexico
Tremel States-Jones	S	Rhode Island
Jamarrien Burt	S	Mississippi Gulf Coast CC
Keith Gallmon Jr.	S	Austin Peay
Adrein Strickland	OT	Unknown
Khalil Jacobs	LB	Missouri
Caeleb Schlachter	TE	Eastern Kentucky
Bryston Dixon	DL	Jones JC
Trip Maxwell	QB	Stetson
Josh Bledsoe	DB	Southern Miss
Cameron Rutledge	S	Mississippi College

Incoming
Player	Position	Previous school
Aakil Washington	LB	Liberty
Noah Toster	WR	Chowan
Malachi Preciado	IOL	Purdue
Lardarius Webb Jr.	S	Oklahoma State
Laith Marjan	K	East Carolina
Andrew Bench	TE	Bowling Green
Bryston Dixon	DL	Georgia Tech
Darius McKenzie	LB	Maine
Courtney McBride Jr.	EDGE	Florida Atlantic
Trent Singleton	S	Mississippi State
Tre'Darius Brown	DL	Texas Tech
Iverson Celestine	RB	Tulane
Jayden Hobson	OT	Mississippi State
Ethan Hubbard	OT	Duke
Micah Woods	WR	Buffalo
Tyler Thomas	EDGE	UAB
Tylen Campbell	WR	North Alabama

=== Recruiting class ===
College recruiting (2024)
Name	Hometown	School	Height	Weight	40^{‡}	Commit date
Andrew Bench; TE	Genoa, OH	Genoa Area HS; Bowling Green	6 ft 5 in (1.96 m)	220 lb (100 kg)	–	Jan 6, 2024
Andrew Bench; TE	Recruit ratings: Rivals: 247Sports:					
Da'Marion Bothwell; RB	Oneonta, AL	Oneonta HS	5 ft 11 in (1.80 m)	220 lb (100 kg)	–	Sep 20, 2023
Da'Marion Bothwell; RB	Recruit ratings: Rivals: 247Sports:					
Ben Brewer; WR	Mobile, AL	Mobile Christian	5 ft 10 in (1.78 m)	183 lb (83 kg)	–	
Ben Brewer; WR	Recruit ratings: No ratings found					
Tylen Campbell; WR	Jackson, AL	Jackson HS; North Alabama	5 ft 10 in (1.78 m)	178 lb (81 kg)	–	
Tylen Campbell; WR	Recruit ratings: No ratings found					
Tyler Carter; EDGE	Vicksburg, MS	Vicksburg HS	6 ft 6 in (1.98 m)	251 lb (114 kg)	–	Dec 20, 2023
Tyler Carter; EDGE	Recruit ratings: Rivals: 247Sports: ESPN: (75)					
Iverson Celestine; RB	Mandeville, LA	Fontainebleau HS; Tulane	5 ft 10 in (1.78 m)	209 lb (95 kg)	–	
Iverson Celestine; RB	Recruit ratings: No ratings found					
Damyrion Darby; CB	Bassfield, MS	Jefferson Davis County HS	5 ft 11 in (1.80 m)	170 lb (77 kg)	–	Dec 20, 2023
Damyrion Darby; CB	Recruit ratings: Rivals:					
Julien Demby; LB	Vicksburg, MS	Warren Central HS	6 ft 1 in (1.85 m)	200 lb (91 kg)	–	Feb 4, 2024
Julien Demby; LB	Recruit ratings: 247Sports:					
Bryston Dixon; DL	Leroy, AL	Leroy HS; Georgia Tech	6 ft 3 in (1.91 m)	329 lb (149 kg)	–	Dec 21, 2023
Bryston Dixon; DL	Recruit ratings: Rivals: 247Sports:					
Jalyn Durgan; EDGE	Scooba, MS	St. Martin HS; East Mississippi CC	6 ft 4 in (1.93 m)	250 lb (110 kg)	–	Dec 20, 2023
Jalyn Durgan; EDGE	Recruit ratings: Rivals: 247Sports: ESPN: (74)					
Will Felton; LB	Pelham, AL	Pelham HS	6 ft 2 in (1.88 m)	215 lb (98 kg)	–	
Will Felton; LB	Recruit ratings: 247Sports:					
Amarion Fortenberry; S	Columbia, MO	Columbia HS	6 ft 0 in (1.83 m)	170 lb (77 kg)	–	Jun 23, 2023
Amarion Fortenberry; S	Recruit ratings: Rivals: 247Sports: ESPN: (74)					
TK George; DL	Acworth, GA	Allatoona HS	6 ft 1 in (1.85 m)	260 lb (120 kg)	–	
TK George; DL	Recruit ratings: No ratings found					
DeShaun Gonzales; OL	El Paso, TX	Parkland HS	6 ft 2 in (1.88 m)	318 lb (144 kg)	–	
DeShaun Gonzales; OL	Recruit ratings: No ratings found					
Ty Goodwill; ATH	Mobile, AL	Faith Academy	6 ft 2.5 in (1.89 m)	187 lb (85 kg)	–	Dec 20, 2023
Ty Goodwill; ATH	Recruit ratings: Rivals: 247Sports: ESPN: (73)					
Jerrian Graham; ATH	Mobile, AL	Vigor HS	6 ft 2 in (1.88 m)	190 lb (86 kg)	–	Jul 31, 2023
Jerrian Graham; ATH	Recruit ratings: Rivals: 247Sports: ESPN: (74)					
Charles Gurley III; CB	New Orleans, LA	St. Augustine HS	6 ft 1 in (1.85 m)	170 lb (77 kg)	–	Jun 23, 2023
Charles Gurley III; CB	Recruit ratings: Rivals: 247Sports: ESPN: (73)					
Asher Hale; OT	Mobile, AL	St. Paul's Episcopal	6 ft 5 in (1.96 m)	300 lb (140 kg)	–	Jun 18, 2023
Asher Hale; OT	Recruit ratings: Rivals: 247Sports: ESPN: (71)					
Jared Hollins; QB	Semmes, AL	Mary G. Montgomery HS	6 ft 4 in (1.93 m)	185 lb (84 kg)	–	Jun 25, 2023
Jared Hollins; QB	Recruit ratings: Rivals: 247Sports: ESPN: (75)					
Ethan Hubbard; OT	Hoover, AL	Hoover HS; Duke	6 ft 6 in (1.98 m)	291 lb (132 kg)	–	May 10, 2024
Ethan Hubbard; OT	Recruit ratings: Rivals: 247Sports:					
Kaleb Jackson; S	Bessemer, AL	Hoover HS	5 ft 8 in (1.73 m)	175 lb (79 kg)	–	
Kaleb Jackson; S	Recruit ratings: No ratings found					
Nathan Jennings; DL	Madison, AL	James Clemens	6 ft 4 in (1.93 m)	240 lb (110 kg)	–	Jul 30, 2023
Nathan Jennings; DL	Recruit ratings: Rivals: 247Sports: ESPN: (72)					
Logan Joellenbeck; OT	Foley, AL	Foley HS	6 ft 6 in (1.98 m)	330 lb (150 kg)	–	Jun 25, 2023
Logan Joellenbeck; OT	Recruit ratings: Rivals: 247Sports: ESPN: (71)					
Miles Kelly; RB	Tallahassee, FL	Lincoln HS	5 ft 10 in (1.78 m)	190 lb (86 kg)	–	
Miles Kelly; RB	Recruit ratings: No ratings found					
Davis Little; K	Cummings, GA	South Forsyth HS	6 ft 0 in (1.83 m)	165 lb (75 kg)	–	Nov 16, 2023
Davis Little; K	Recruit ratings: Rivals: 247Sports: ESPN: (73)					
Will Loerzel; TE	New Orleans, LA	Isidore Newman School	6 ft 4 in (1.93 m)	245 lb (111 kg)	–	Jul 31, 2023
Will Loerzel; TE	Recruit ratings: Rivals: 247Sports:					
Laith Marjan; K	Raleigh, NC	Enloe HS; East Carolina	6 ft 3 in (1.91 m)	190 lb (86 kg)	–	Jan 8, 2024
Laith Marjan; K	Recruit ratings: Rivals:					
Darius McKenzie; LB	Ottawa, Ontario, Canada	Clearwater Academy International; Maine	6 ft 3 in (1.91 m)	240 lb (110 kg)	–	May 6, 2024
Darius McKenzie; LB	Recruit ratings: No ratings found					
Malachi Preciado; IOL	New Orleans, LA	Warren Easton HS; Purdue	6 ft 1 in (1.85 m)	310 lb (140 kg)	–	Dec 11, 2023
Malachi Preciado; IOL	Recruit ratings: Rivals: 247Sports:					
Seth Russo; OL	Waveland, MS	Bay HS; East Mississippi CC; Mississippi College	6 ft 1 in (1.85 m)	305 lb (138 kg)	–	
Seth Russo; OL	Recruit ratings: No ratings found					
Jeremy Scott; WR	Jackson, MS	Callaway HS	6 ft 4 in (1.93 m)	190 lb (86 kg)	–	Feb 4, 2024
Jeremy Scott; WR	Recruit ratings: Rivals: 247Sports: ESPN: (75)					
Jordan Scruggs; CB	Hutchinson, KS	Hutchinson CC	5 ft 11 in (1.80 m)	185 lb (84 kg)	–	Dec 17, 2023
Jordan Scruggs; CB	Recruit ratings: Rivals: 247Sports:					
Parker Shattuck; ATH	LaGrange, GA	LaGrange HS	6 ft 2 in (1.88 m)	215 lb (98 kg)	–	Jun 24, 2023
Parker Shattuck; ATH	Recruit ratings: Rivals: 247Sports:					
Trent Singleton; S	Edwards, MS	Raymond HS; Mississippi State	6 ft 0 in (1.83 m)	190 lb (86 kg)	–	May 6, 2024
Trent Singleton; S	Recruit ratings: Rivals: 247Sports:					
Noah Toster; WR	Apex, NC	Apex HS; Chowan	6 ft 4 in (1.93 m)	190 lb (86 kg)	–	
Noah Toster; WR	Recruit ratings: No ratings found					
Aakil Washington; LB	Atlanta, GA	Wheeler HS; Liberty	6 ft 2 in (1.88 m)	240 lb (110 kg)	–	
Aakil Washington; LB	Recruit ratings: Rivals: 247Sports:					
Lardarius Webb Jr. S	Opelika, AL	Jackson Academy (Mississippi); Oklahoma State	5 ft 10 in (1.78 m)	175 lb (79 kg)	–	
Lardarius Webb Jr. S	Recruit ratings: Rivals: 247Sports:					
Achilles Woods; EDGE	Decatur, AL	Austin HS	6 ft 4 in (1.93 m)	250 lb (110 kg)	–	Jun 25, 2023
Achilles Woods; EDGE	Recruit ratings: Rivals: 247Sports: ESPN: (72)					

=== Roster ===
2024 South Alabama Jaguars football team roster
Players
Coaches
Offense

Pos.	#	Name	Class
RB	0	Braylon McReynolds	So
WR	1	Devin Voisin	Sr
WR	2	Jamaal Pritchett	Sr
RB	3	Kentrel Bullock	Jr
QB	4	Bishop Davenport	So
WR	6	Micah Woods	Jr
QB	7	Gio Lopez	Fr
TE	8	DJ Thomas-Jones	Sr
WR	9	Jeremy Scott	Fr
WR	10	Noah Toster	So
WR	11	Anthony Eager	Fr
QB	12	Jacob Jones	Fr
WR	13	Javon Ivory	Sr
WB	14	Brett Nezat	Jr
WR	15	Shamar Sandgren	Sr
QB	16	Jared Hollins	Fr
WR	17	Jace Larsen	Fr
WR	18	Keyshawn Woodyard	Jr
TE	19	Rod Gibbs	So
WR	20	Webber McClinton	Fr
RB	21	Jarvis Durr	Fr
RB	22	PJ Martin	Fr
RB	23	Iverson Celestine	Jr
RB	24	Fluff Bothwell	Fr
WR	25	Ben Brewer	Fr
RB	26	Jonathan Carter	Sr
WR	27	Tylen Campbell	So
WR	30	Stacey Boykins Jr.	Fr
RB	33	Dorian Smith	Fr
OL	51	Reed Buys	Sr
OL	55	Malachi Preciado	So
OL	56	Adrian Griffin	Fr
OL	58	Hayden Dozier	So
OL	59	Sam Williams	Jr
OL	61	Julius Kidd	Fr
OL	65	DeShaun Gonzales	Fr
OL	69	Kenton Jerido	So
OL	70	Asher Hale	Fr
OL	72	Ethan Hubbard	Fr
OL	73	Daniel Foster-Allen	Jr
OL	74	Reid Gavin	Jr
OL	75	Damon Parr	So
OL	76	Logan Joellenbeck	Fr
OL	77	Malachi Carney	So
OL	78	Samuel Loper	Sr
OL	79	Jordan Davis	Jr
TE	80	Hollis McDaniel	Fr
WR	81	Jeremiah Webb	Sr
TE	82	Trent Thomas	Fr
WR	83	Jerrian Graham	Fr
TE	84	Devin Guin	Fr
TE	85	Will Loerzel	Fr
TE	86	Todd Justice	Sr
WR	88	Chris Holifield Jr.	Jr
TE	89	Andrew Bench	Sr

Defense

Pos.	#	Name	Class
S	0	Christopher Wallace Jr.	Jr
CB	1	Ricky Fletcher	Jr
S	2	Jaden Voisin	Sr
S	3	Rickey Hyatt Jr.	Jr
CB	4	Dallas Gamble	Sr
DB	6	Wesley Miller	So
S	7	Lardarius Webb Jr.	Jr
CB	8	Jordan Scruggs	Jr
S	9	Trent Singleton	So
LB	10	Aakil Washington	Jr
LB	11	Dalton Hughes	Jr
CB	12	Reggie Neely	Jr
S	14	Cole Blaylock	Fr
LB	15	Chrystyile Caldwell	So
CB	16	Brian Dillard	Sr
LB	17	Courtney McBride Jr.	Sr
DL	18	RJ Moss Jr.	Fr
CB	19	Amarion Fortenberry	Fr
DL	20	Lamondre Brooks	Jr
DL	21	Jordan Norman	Fr
S	22	Ty Goodwill	Fr
CB	23	Cube Gurley	Fr
S	24	Damyrion Darby	Fr
S	25	Dashaun Caffee	Fr
LB	26	Parker Shattuck	Fr
LB	27	Gavin Forsha	Jr
LB	28	Darius McKenzie	Jr
S	29	Kaleb Jackson	Fr
DL	30	Achilles Woods	Fr
S	31	Mike Harris	Jr
LB	32	Blayne Myrick	So
LB	33	Julien Demby	Fr
CB	34	Bradley Thomas	So
S	35	Matthew Laseter	Fr
LB	36	William Felton IV	Fr
CB	37	Davaris Pilcher	Jr
S	38	Camden Lawson	Fr
S	39	Rod Ivy	Fr
DL	41	Tyler Carter	Fr
LB	42	Bennett Blanks	Fr
LB	43	Jacob Porco	Fr
CB	44	Michael Archie	Sr
DL	45	Ed Smith IV	Jr
LB	47	Donnie Arnold	Fr
LB	48	Jordan Williams	Fr
DL	49	Tre Brown	Fr
LB	53	Emauri Sibley	So
DL	55	Maurice Strong Jr.	GS
DL	74	Johnathan Street	Jr
DL	90	Carlos Johnson Jr.	Sr
DL	91	Nathan Jennings	Fr
DL	93	Josh Jones	Jr
DL	95	Jalyn Durgan	Jr
DL	96	Eli Webb	So
DL	97	Tyler Thomas	Fr
DL	99	Wy’Kevious Thomas	Sr

Special teams

Pos.	#	Name	Class
K	35	Davis Little	Fr
P	40	Aleksi Pulkkinen	So
LS	42	Anthony Zaccaro	Jr
LS	44	Baxter Turner	Fr
LS	47	Grant Rountree	Fr
P	87	Jack Martin	Sr
K	94	Hamilton DiBoyan	Fr
K	99	Laith Marjan	Jr

Head coach

- Major Applewhite (Texas)

Coordinators/assistant coaches

- Rob Ezell (Alabama)
  Offensive coordinator / quarterbacks
- Will Windham (Mississippi State)
  Defensive coordinator / safeties
- Tre' Williams (Auburn)
  Special teams coordinator / outside linebackers
- Jay Hopson (Mississippi)
  Cornerbacks
- Cameron Cleminson (Michigan State)
  Inside linebackers
- Kyle Skierski (UC Davis)
  Tight ends
- Paul Petrino (Carroll (MT))
  Wide receivers
- Effrem Reed (Louisiana)
  Running backs
- Jason Onyebuagu (Northern Illinois)
  Offensive line
- Jonathan Bradley (Arkansas State)
  Defensive line
- Doug Ruse (Northwest Missouri State)
  Quality control analyst
- Rod Grace (UT Martin)
  Director of strength & conditioning

Legend

- (C) Team captain
- (S) Suspended
- (I) Ineligible
- Injured
- Redshirt

Roster

== Game summaries ==
=== North Texas ===
North Texas Mean Green (0–0) at South Alabama Jaguars (0–0)

Quarter	1	2	3	4	Total
Mean Green	7	7	28	10	52
Jaguars	3	16	7	12	38

at Hancock Whitney Stadium, Mobile, AL

- Date: August 31, 2024
- Game time: 4:00 p.m. CDT
- Game weather: Cloudy • Temperature: 86 °F (30 °C) • Wind: SE 6 mph
- Game attendance: 15,559
- Referee: Edwin Lee
- TV announcers (ESPN+): Pat Greenwood (play-by-play) and Brian Genard (analyst)

Game information

First Quarter

- (9:37) UNT – Chandler Morris 2-yard run, Kali Nguma kick (Drive: 15 plays, 79 yards, 5:18; North Texas 7–0)
- (5:58) USA – Laith Marjan 39-yard field goal (Drive: 8 plays, 57 yards, 3:34; North Texas 7–3)

Second Quarter

- (14:55) USA – Gio Lopez 8-yard run, Laith Marjan kick (Drive: 7 plays, 72 yards, 2:13; South Alabama 10–7)
- (12:43) UNT – Damon Ward Jr. 3-yard pass from Chandler Morris, Kali Nguma kick (Drive: 7 plays, 79 yards, 2:06; North Texas 14–10)
- (9:39) USA – Laith Marjan 32-yard field goal (Drive: 8 plays, 61 yards, 3:04; North Texas 14–13)
- (4:24) USA – Fluff Bothwell 13-yard run (Drive: 12 plays, 83 yards, 3:55; South Alabama 19–14)

Third Quarter

- (13:23) UNT – Blair Conwright 25-yard pass from Chandler Morris, Kali Nguma kick (Drive: 3 plays, 66 yards, 0:47; North Texas 21–19)
- (10:14) UNT – Chandler Morris 1-yard run, Kali Nguma kick (Drive: 5 plays, 50 yards, 2:16; North Texas 28–19)
- (5:15) USA – Jamaal Pritchett 26-yard pass from Gio Lopez, Laith Marjan kick (Drive: 9 plays, 75 yards, 4:59; North Texas 28–26)
- (3:36) UNT – Damon Ward Jr. 54-yard pass from Chandler Morris, Kali Nguma kick (Drive: 4 plays, 69 yards, 1:35; North Texas 35–26)
- (2:40) UNT – C.J. Garnett 0-yard punt return, Kali Nguma kick (North Texas 42–26)

Fourth Quarter

- (13:31) USA – Shamar Sandgren 21-yard pass from Gio Lopez (Drive: 9 plays, 75 yards, 4:09; North Texas 42–32)
- (8:28) UNT – Ikaika Ragsdale 3-yard run, Kali Nguma kick (Drive: 10 plays, 76 yards, 4:57; North Texas 49–32)
- (4:39) USA – Anthony Eager 23-yard pass from Gio Lopez (Drive: 10 plays, 75 yards, 3:49; North Texas 49–38)
- (2:53) UNT – Kali Nguma 30-yard field goal (Drive: 7 plays, 28 yards, 1:46; North Texas 52–38)

Win Probability

Line

- –6

Over/Under

- 61.5

Statistics	UNT	USA
First downs	28	29
Total yards	550	582
Rushing yards	104	150
Passing yards	446	432
Passing: Comp–Att–Int	33–42–0	26–49–0
Time of possession	29:32	30:28

Team	Category	Player	Statistics
North Texas	Passing	Chandler Morris	32/41, 415 yards, 3 TD
North Texas	Rushing	Ikaika Ragsdale	14 carries, 45 yards, TD
North Texas	Receiving	Damon Ward Jr.	12 receptions, 230 yards, 2 TD
South Alabama	Passing	Gio Lopez	26/49, 432 yards, 3 TD
South Alabama	Rushing	Gio Lopez	13 carries, 62 yards, TD
South Alabama	Receiving	Jamaal Pritchett	10 receptions, 197 yards, TD

=== at Ohio ===
South Alabama Jaguars (0–1) at Ohio Bobcats (0–1)

Quarter	1	2	3	4	Total
Jaguars	0	10	7	3	20
Bobcats	3	14	7	3	27

at Peden Stadium, Athens, OH

- Date: September 7, 2024
- Game time: 5:00 p.m. CDT
- Game weather: Sunny • Temperature: 81 °F (27 °C)
- Game attendance: 22,158
- Referee: Jeremy Parker
- TV announcers (ESPN+): Jim Barbar (play-by-play), Marcus Ray (analyst)

Game information

First Quarter

- (3:03) OHI – Gianni Spetic 45-yard field goal (Drive: 5 plays, 54 yards, 1:35; Ohio 3–0)

Second Quarter

- (10:43) OHI – Anthony Tyus III 7-yard run, Gianni Spetic kick (Drive: 3 plays, 20 yards, 1:24; Ohio 10–0)
- (4:29) USA – Laith Marjan 28-yard field goal (Drive: 6 plays, 54 yards, 2:25; Ohio 10–3)
- (1:25) USA – Fluff Bothwell 8-yard run, Laith Marjan kick (Drive: 5 plays, 60 yards, 1:53; Tied 10–10)
- (0:36) OHI – Chase Hendricks 33-yard pass from Parker Navarro, Gianni Spetic kick (Drive: 7 plays, 75 yards, 0:49; Ohio 17–10)

Third Quarter

- (8:39) OHI – Parker Navarro 10-yard run, Gianni Spetic kick (Drive: 11 plays, 76 yards, 6:14; Ohio 24–10)
- (1:52) USA – Jamaal Pritchett 9-yard pass from Bishop Davenport, Laith Marjan kick (Drive: 13 plays, 75 yards, 6:47; Ohio 24–17)

Fourth Quarter

- (14:15) USA – Laith Marjan 38-yard field goal (Drive: 6 plays, 21 yards, 2:21; Ohio 24–20)
- (3:16) OHI – Gianni Spetic 26-yard field goal (Drive: 14 plays, 78 yards, 7:53; Ohio 27–20)

Win Probability

Line

- South Alabama –1.5

Over/Under

- 57.5

Statistics	USA	OHIO
First downs	18	20
Total yards	335	404
Rushing yards	109	200
Passing yards	226	204
Passing: Comp–Att–Int	23–37–0	20–28–0
Time of possession	27:43	32:17

Team	Category	Player	Statistics
South Alabama	Passing	Bishop Davenport	23/37, 226 yards, TD
South Alabama	Rushing	Fluff Bothwell	10 carries, 70 yards, TD
South Alabama	Receiving	Devin Voisin	5 receptions, 77 yards
Ohio	Passing	Parker Navarro	20/28, 204 yards, TD
Ohio	Rushing	Anthony Tyus III	17 carries, 74 yards, TD
Ohio	Receiving	Chase Hendricks	4 receptions, 65 yards, TD

=== vs. Northwestern State (FCS) ===
Game Three – Northwestern State Demons (FCS) (0–2) at South Alabama Jaguars (0–2) – Game summary

Quarter	1	2	3	4	Total
Demons (FCS)	10	0	0	0	10
Jaguars	24	28	28	7	87

at Hancock Whitney Stadium • Mobile, AL

- Date: Thursday September 12, 2024
- Game time: 6:30 p.m.
- Game weather: Cloudy • Temperature: 85 °F (29 °C) • Wind: NE 10 mph
- Game attendance: 16,023
- Referee: Tim Barker
- TV announcers (ESPN+): Pat Greenwood (play-by-play) and Brian Genard (analyst)

Game information

First quarter

- (13:24) USA – Jamaal Pritchett 62-yard punt return, Laith Marjan kick (South Alabama 7–0)
- (10:58) USA – Jeremiah Webb 39-yard pass from Gio Lopez, Laith Marjan kick (Drive: 1 play, 39 yards, 0:08; South Alabama 14–0)
- (7:30) NWST – Reed Honshtein 31-yard field goal (Drive: 8 plays, 61 yards, 3:28; South Alabama 14–3)
- (5:07) USA – DJ Thomas-Jones 12-yard pass from Gio Lopez, Laith Marjan kick (Drive: 5 plays, 72 yards, 2:23; South Alabama 21–3)
- (0:03) USA – Laith Marjan 28-yard field goal (Drive: 9 plays, 63 yards, 4:07; South Alabama 24–3)
- (0:00) NWST – Myles Kitt-Denton 75-yard pass from JT Fayard, Reed Honshtein kick (Drive: 1 play, 75 yards, 0:03; South Alabama 24–10)

Second quarter

- (13:15) USA – Kentrel Bullock 1-yard run, Laith Marjan kick (Drive: 5 plays, 75 yards, 1:45; South Alabama 31–10)
- (10:15) USA – Fluff Bothwell 7-yard run, Laith Marjan kick (Drive: 3 plays, 43 yards, 1:21; South Alabama 38–10)
- (9:25) USA – DJ Thomas-Jones 4-yard pass from Gio Lopez, Laith Marjan kick (Drive: 1 play, 4 yards, 0:07; South Alabama 45–10)
- (2:04) USA – Fluff Bothwell 5-yard run, Laith Marjan kick (Drive: 2 plays, 62 yards, 0:41; South Alabama 52–10)

Third quarter

- (14:18) USA – Kentrel Bullock 59-yard run, Laith Marjan kick (Drive: 2 plays, 70 yards, 0:38; South Alabama 59–10)
- (6:48) USA – Jamaal Pritchett 10-yard pass from Gio Lopez, Davis Little kick (Drive: 9 plays, 59 yards, 3:41; South Alabama 66–10)
- (2:40) USA – PJ Martin 4-yard run, Davis Little kick (Drive: 4 plays, 51 yards, 2:10; South Alabama 73–10)
- (0:55) USA – Chrystyile Caldwell 30-yard interception, Davis Little kick (South Alabama 80–10)

Fourth quarter

- (3:57) USA – Jarvis Durr 4-yard run, Davis Little kick (Drive: 5 plays, 22 yards, 11:48; South Alabama 87–10)

Statistics	NWST	USA
First downs	8	22
Total yards	237	620
Rushing yards	66	363
Passing yards	171	257
Passing: Comp–Att–Int	10–25–3	15–19–0
Time of possession	26:47	33:13

Team	Category	Player	Statistics
Northwestern State	Passing	JT Fayard	9/23, 165 yards, TD, 2 INT
Northwestern State	Rushing	Zay Davis	9 carries, 32 yards
Northwestern State	Receiving	Myles Kitt-Denton	3 receptions, 80 yards, TD
South Alabama	Passing	Gio Lopez	15/19, 257 yards, 4 TD
South Alabama	Rushing	Fluff Bothwell	7 carries, 143 yards, 2 TD
South Alabama	Receiving	Jeremiah Webb	2 receptions, 74 yards, TD

The fourth quarter was shortened to six minutes as South Alabama was up 80–10 at the end of the third.

=== at Appalachian State ===
South Alabama Jaguars (1–2) at Appalachian State Mountaineers (2–1)

Quarter	1	2	3	4	Total
Jaguars	14	14	13	7	48
Mountaineers	0	7	0	7	14

at Kidd Brewer Stadium, Boone, NC

- Date: September 19, 2024
- Game time: 6:30 p.m. CDT
- Game weather: Sunny • Temperature: 66 °F (19 °C) • Wind: N 3 mph
- Game attendance: 34,133
- Referee: Marshall Lewis
- TV announcers (ESPN): Matt Barrie (play-by-play), Dan Mullen (analyst) and Harry Lyles Jr. (sideline)

Game information

First Quarter

- (11:59) USA – DJ Thomas-Jones 10-yard pass from Gio Lopez, Laith Marjan kick (Drive: 6 plays, 75 yards, 3:01; South Alabama 7–0)
- (7:10) USA – Fluff Bothwell 22-yard run, Laith Marjan kick (Drive: 6 plays, 60 yards, 2:06; South Alabama 14–0)

Second Quarter

- (5:30) USA – Gio Lopez 31-yard run, Laith Marjan kick (Drive: 13 plays, 95 yards, 7:49; South Alabama 21–0)
- (2:30) USA – Kentrel Bullock 2-yard run, Laith Marjan kick (Drive: 2 plays, 2 yards, 0:12; South Alabama 28–0)
- (0:00) APP – Dalton Stroman 47-yard pass from Joey Aguilar, Michael Hughes kick (Drive: 6 plays, 75 yards, 0:53; South Alabama 28–7)

Third Quarter

- (11:08) USA – Jamaal Pritchett 18-yard pass from Gio Lopez, Laith Marjan kick failed (Drive: 3 plays, 47 yards, 1:31; South Alabama 34–7)
- (5:35) USA – Fluff Bothwell 14-yard run, Laith Marjan kick (Drive: 6 plays, 67 yards, 3:04; South Alabama 41–7)

Fourth Quarter

- (4:15) USA – Iverson Celestine 6-yard run, Hamilton DiBoyan kick (Drive: 9 plays, 55 yards, 6:00; South Alabama 48–7)
- (0:52) APP – Maquel Haywood 2-yard run, Michael Hughes kick (Drive: 12 plays, 75 yards, 3:16; South Alabama 48–14)

Win Probability

Line

Over/Under

Statistics	USA	APP
First downs	26	23
Total yards	474	385
Rushing yards	320	119
Passing yards	154	266
Passing: Comp–Att–Int	16–24–1	21–40–0
Time of possession	34:12	25:48

Team	Category	Player	Statistics
South Alabama	Passing	Gio Lopez	16/24, 154 yards, 2 TD
South Alabama	Rushing	Fluff Bothwell	14 carries, 116 yards, 2 TD
South Alabama	Receiving	Jamaal Pritchett	6 receptions, 68 yards, TD
Appalachian State	Passing	Joey Aguilar	21/40, 266 yards, TD, INT
Appalachian State	Rushing	Maquel Haywood	7 carries, 47 yards, TD
Appalachian State	Receiving	Kaedin Robinson	6 receptions, 85 yards

=== at No. 14 LSU ===
South Alabama Jaguars (2–2) at No. 14 LSU Tigers (3–1)

Quarter	1	2	3	4	Total
Jaguars	0	3	7	0	10
No. 14 Tigers	21	14	0	7	42

at Tiger Stadium, Baton Rouge, LA

- Date: September 28
- Game time: 6:45 p.m. CDT
- Game weather: Sunny • Temperature: 86 °F (30 °C) • Wind: NW 5 mph
- Game attendance: 102,143
- Referee: Matt Loeffler
- TV announcers (SECN): Dave Neal (play-by-play), Aaron Murray (analyst), and Ashley ShahAhmadi (sideline)

Game information

First Quarter

- (14:36) LSU – Caden Durham 71-yard pass from Garrett Nussmeier, Damian Ramos kick (Drive: 1 play, 71 yards, 0:14; LSU 7–0)
- (10:47) LSU – Garrett Nussmeier 1-yard run, Damian Ramos kick (Drive: 2 plays, 87 yards, 0:54; LSU 14–0)
- (4:45) LSU – Caden Durham 8-yard run, Damian Ramos kick (Drive: 11 plays, 79 yards, 4:15; LSU 21–0)

Second Quarter

- (14:15) USA – Laith Marjan 49-yard field goal (Drive: 10 plays, 44 yards, 5:30; LSU 21–3)
- (11:55) LSU – Garrett Nussmeier 5-yard run, Damian Ramos kick (Drive: 5 plays, 60 yards, 2:11; LSU 28–3)
- (4:27) LSU – Aaron Anderson 23-yard pass from Garrett Nussmeier, Damian Ramos kick (Drive: 4 plays, 69 yards, 1:37; LSU 35–3)

Third Quarter

- (10:17) USA – Anthony Eager 27-yard pass from Gio Lopez, Laith Marjan kick (Drive: 9 plays, 75 yards, 4:43; LSU 35–10)

Fourth Quarter

- (14:08) LSU – Josh Williams 4-yard run, Damian Ramos kick (Drive: 12 plays, 99 yards, 5:39; LSU 42–10)

Win Probability

Line

Over/Under

Statistics	USA	LSU
First downs	16	29
Total yards	333	667
Rushing yards	112	237
Passing yards	221	430
Passing: Comp–Att–Int	20–30–0	29–42–2
Time of possession	31:00	29:00

Team	Category	Player	Statistics
South Alabama	Passing	Gio Lopez	16/22, 171 yards, TD
South Alabama	Rushing	Kentrel Bullock	9 carries, 56 yards
South Alabama	Receiving	Anthony Eager	4 receptions, 91 yards, TD
LSU	Passing	Garrett Nussmeier	26/39, 409 yards, 2 TD, 2 INT
LSU	Rushing	Caden Durham	7 carries, 128 yards, TD
LSU	Receiving	Kyren Lacy	5 receptions, 107 yards

=== at Arkansas State ===
South Alabama Jaguars (2–3) at Arkansas State Red Wolves (2–2)

Quarter	1	2	3	4	Total
Jaguars	0	3	7	6	16
Red Wolves	3	3	3	9	18

at Centennial Bank Stadium, Jonesboro, AR

- Date: October 5
- Game time: 6:00 p.m. CDT
- Game weather: Sunny • Temperature: 84 °F (29 °C) • Wind: SE 4 mph
- Game attendance: 21,427
- Referee: Jeremy Parker
- TV announcers (ESPN+): Roger Twibell (play-by-play), Pete Cordelli (analyst) and Darrell Greene (sideline)

Game information

First Quarter

- (4:43) ASU – Clune Van Andel 20-yard field goal (Drive: 7 plays, 83 yards, 2:36; Arkansas State 3–0)

Second Quarter

- (1:01) ASU – Clune Van Andel 21-yard field goal (Drive: 12 plays, 76 yards, 3:02; Arkansas State 6–0)
- (0:00) USA – Laith Marjan 42-yard field goal (Drive: 7 plays, 45 yards, 1:00; Arkansas State 6–3)

Third Quarter

- (1:54) ASU – Clune Van Andel 25-yard field goal (Drive: 7 plays, 79 yards, 2:47; Arkansas State 9–3)
- (1:09) USA – Jamaal Pritchett 75-yard pass from Gio Lopez, Laith Marjan kick (Drive: 2 plays, 75 yards, 0:45; South Alabama 10–9)

Fourth Quarter

- (5:58) ASU – Tyler Little 5-yard pass from Jaylen Raynor (Drive: 10 plays, 58 yards, 5:32; Arkansas State 15–10)
- (1:48) USA – Jamaal Pritchett 26-yard pass from Gio Lopez (Drive: 10 plays, 80 yards, 4:08; South Alabama 16–15)
- (0:10) ASU – Clune Van Andel 34-yard field goal (Drive: 10 plays, 60 yards, 1:35; Arkansas State 18–16)

Win Probability

Line

Over/Under

Statistics	USA	ARST
First downs	24	24
Total yards	453	411
Rushing yards	161	66
Passing yards	292	345
Passing: Comp–Att–Int	21–36–1	30–39–0
Time of possession	30:57	29:03

Team	Category	Player	Statistics
South Alabama	Passing	Gio Lopez	21/35, 292 yards, 2 TD, INT
South Alabama	Rushing	Kentrel Bullock	13 carries, 66 yards
South Alabama	Receiving	Jamaal Pritchett	7 receptions, 137 yards, 2 TD
Arkansas State	Passing	Jaylen Raynor	30/39, 345 yards, TD
Arkansas State	Rushing	Zak Wallace	11 carries, 30 yards
Arkansas State	Receiving	Corey Rucker	8 receptions, 172 yards

=== Troy (rivalry) ===
Troy Trojans (1–5) at South Alabama Jaguars (2–4)

Quarter	1	2	3	4	Total
Trojans	0	3	0	6	9
Jaguars	3	16	6	0	25

at Hancock Whitney Stadium, Mobile, AL

- Date: October 15, 2024
- Game time: 6:30 p.m. CDT
- Game weather: Cloudy • Temperature: 76 °F (24 °C) • Wind: SE 4 mph
- Game attendance: 25,450
- Referee: Trennis Livingston
- TV announcers (ESPN2): Clay Matvick (play-by-play) and Steve Addazio (analyst)

Game information

First Quarter

- (1:18) USA – Laith Marjan 36-yard field goal (Drive: 11 plays, 34 yards, 5:08; South Alabama 3–0)

Second Quarter

- (9:10) USA – Jeremiah Webb 24-yard pass from Gio Lopez, Laith Marjan kick (Drive: 2 plays, 22 yards, 0:42; South Alabama 10–0)
- (7:40) USA – 0-yard safety (South Alabama 12–0)
- (4:34) USA – Gio Lopez 49-yard run, Laith Marjan kick (Drive: 5 plays, 69 yards, 3:00; South Alabama 19–0)
- (0:18) TROY – Scott Taylor Renfroe 36-yard field goal (Drive: 15 plays, 57 yards, 4:16; South Alabama 19–3)

Third Quarter

- (8:34) USA – Laith Marjan 42-yard field goal (Drive: 6 plays, 48 yards, 3:35; South Alabama 22–3)
- (0:50) USA – Laith Marjan 42-yard field goal (Drive: 4 plays, -2 yards, 1:51; South Alabama 25–3)

Fourth Quarter

- (2:35) TROY – Devonte Ross 11-yard pass from Matthew Caldwell (Drive: 4 plays, 64 yards, 1:31; South Alabama 25–9)

Win Probability

Line

Over/Under

Statistics	TROY	USA
First downs	14	12
Total yards	172	318
Rushing yards	36	160
Passing yards	136	158
Passing: Comp–Att–Int	19–36–3	16–21–0
Time of possession	24:03	35:57

Team	Category	Player	Statistics
Troy	Passing	Matthew Caldwell	17/30, 142 yards, TD, 2 INT
Troy	Rushing	Damien Taylor	6 carries, 23 yards
Troy	Receiving	Devonte Ross	7 receptions, 70 yards, TD
South Alabama	Passing	Gio Lopez	16/21, 158 yards, TD
South Alabama	Rushing	Gio Lopez	11 carries, 67 yards, TD
South Alabama	Receiving	Javon Ivory	1 reception, 57 yards

=== Louisiana–Monroe ===
Louisiana–Monroe Warhawks (5–1) at South Alabama Jaguars (3–4)

Quarter	1	2	3	4	Total
Warhawks	7	10	0	0	17
Jaguars	7	5	20	14	46

at Hancock Whitney Stadium, Mobile, AL

- Date: October 26, 2024
- Game time: 4:00 p.m. CDT
- Game weather: Sunny • Temperature: 87 °F (31 °C) • Wind: W 3 mph
- Game attendance: 16,746
- Referee: Steven Robinson
- TV announcers (ESPN+): Pat Greenwood (play-by-play) and Brian Genard (analyst)

Game information

First Quarter

- (10:19) USA – Kentrel Bullock 4-yard run, Laith Marjan kick (Drive: 8 plays, 70 yards, 3:00; South Alabama 7–0)
- (8:07) ULM – Davon Wells 51-yard pass from Aidan Armenta, Max Larson kick (Drive: 4 plays, 64 yards, 2:12; Tied 7–7)

Second Quarter

- (10:06) ULM – Hunter Herring 44-yard run, Max Larson kick (Drive: 6 plays, 80 yards, 2:56; Louisiana–Monroe 14–7)
- (4:33) USA – 0-yard safety (Louisiana–Monroe 14–9)
- (2:24) USA – Laith Marjan 48-yard field goal (Drive: 7 plays, 28 yards, 2:02; Louisiana–Monroe 14–12)
- (0:00) ULM – Max Larson 28-yard field goal (Drive: 6 plays, 70 yards, 1:08; Louisiana–Monroe 17–12)

Third Quarter

- (11:56) USA – Fluff Bothwell 3-yard run, Laith Marjan kick (Drive: 9 plays, 74 yards, 2:58; South Alabama 19–17)
- (9:45) USA – Kentrel Bullock 13-yard run (Drive: 5 plays, 28 yards, 2:02; South Alabama 25–17)
- (3:13) USA – Gio Lopez 5-yard run, Laith Marjan kick (Drive: 9 plays, 60 yards, 3:55; South Alabama 32–17)

Fourth Quarter

- (3:54) USA – Fluff Bothwell 1-yard run, Laith Marjan kick (Drive: 11 plays, 93 yards, 6:29; South Alabama 39–17)
- (1:47) USA – Braylon McReynolds 24-yard run, Laith Marjan kick (Drive: 2 plays, 36 yards, 0:15; South Alabama 46–17)

Win Probability

Line

Over/Under

Statistics	ULM	USA
First downs	15	28
Total yards	387	523
Rushing yards	238	355
Passing yards	149	168
Passing: Comp–Att–Int	11–24–2	18–30–0
Time of possession	30:00	30:00

Team	Category	Player	Statistics
Louisiana–Monroe	Passing	Aidan Armenta	11/23, 149 yards, TD, 2 INT
Louisiana–Monroe	Rushing	Ahmad Hardy	20 carries, 104 yards
Louisiana–Monroe	Receiving	Javon Campbell	2 receptions, 77 yards
South Alabama	Passing	Gio Lopez	18/30, 168 yards
South Alabama	Rushing	Kentrel Bullock	18 carries, 141 yards, 2 TD
South Alabama	Receiving	Jamaal Pritchett	11 receptions, 89 yards

=== Georgia Southern ===
Georgia Southern Eagles (5–3) at South Alabama Jaguars (4–4)

Quarter	1	2	3	4	Total
Eagles	7	7	0	20	34
Jaguars	3	10	17	0	30

at Hancock Whitney Stadium, Mobile, AL

- Date: November 2, 2024
- Game time: 6:30 p.m. CDT
- Game weather: Sunny • Temperature: 75 °F (24 °C) • Wind: NW 7 mph
- Game attendance: 19,667
- Referee: Tim Barker
- TV announcers (ESPNU): Lowell Galindo (play-by-play) and Fozzy Whittaker (analyst)

Game information

First Quarter

- (7:30) GASO – David Mbadinga 1-yard run, Gavin Stewart kick (Drive: 16 plays, 81 yards, 7:25; Georgia Southern 7–0)
- (3:30) USA – Laith Marjan 41-yard field goal (Drive: 10 plays, 52 yards, 4:00; Georgia Southern 7–3)

Second Quarter

- (8:17) GASO – Josh Dallas 23-yard pass from JC French, Gavin Stewart kick (Drive: 11 plays, 66 yards, 4:52; Georgia Southern 14–3)
- (4:26) USA – Fluff Bothwell 1-yard run, Laith Marjan kick (Drive: 9 plays, 55 yards, 3:42; Georgia Southern 14–10)
- (0:07) USA – Laith Marjan 35-yard field goal (Drive: 8 plays, 61 yards, 2:17; Georgia Southern 14–13)

Third Quarter

- (10:17) USA – Laith Marjan 24-yard field goal (Drive: 11 plays, 69 yards, 4:43; South Alabama 16–14)
- (5:08) USA – Fluff Bothwell 22-yard run, Laith Marjan kick (Drive: 8 plays, 79 yards, 3:38; South Alabama 23–14)
- (0:34) USA – Jamaal Pritchett 0-yard pass from Gio Lopez, Laith Marjan kick (Drive: 6 plays, 48 yards, 2:23; South Alabama 30–14)

Fourth Quarter

- (14:53) GASO – Josh Dallas 45-yard pass from JC French (Drive: 2 plays, 46 yards, 0:34; South Alabama 30–20)
- (14:09) GASO – Jalen White 2-yard run, Gavin Stewart kick (Drive: 2 plays, 21 yards, 0:35; South Alabama 30–27)
- (8:14) GASO – Dalen Cobb 22-yard pass from Dexter Williams II, Gavin Stewart kick (Drive: 10 plays, 74 yards, 4:47; Georgia Southern 34–30)

Win Probability

Line

Over/Under

Statistics	GASO	USA
First downs	20	25
Total yards	337	458
Rushing yards	106	184
Passing yards	231	274
Passing: Comp–Att–Int	25–33–0	23–32–1
Time of possession	31:52	28:08

Team	Category	Player	Statistics
Georgia Southern	Passing	JC French	22/27, 198 yards, 2 TD
Georgia Southern	Rushing	Jalen White	18 carries, 71 yards, TD
Georgia Southern	Receiving	Josh Dallas	5 receptions, 96 yards, 2 TD
South Alabama	Passing	Gio Lopez	22/30, 257 yards, TD, INT
South Alabama	Rushing	Kentrel Bullock	17 carries, 101 yards
South Alabama	Receiving	Jamaal Pritchett	12 receptions, 107 yards, TD

=== at Louisiana ===
South Alabama Jaguars (4–5) at Louisiana Ragin' Cajuns (8–1)

Quarter	1	2	3	4	Total
Jaguars	7	17	0	0	24
Ragin' Cajuns	0	3	3	16	22

at Cajun Field, Lafayette, LA

- Date: November 16
- Game time: 6:00 p.m. CDT
- Game weather: Cloudy • Temperature: 69 °F (21 °C) • Wind: W 5 mph
- Game attendance: 16,063
- Referee: Steven Robinson
- TV announcers (ESPN+): Dan McDonald (play-by-play), Eric Mouton (analyst) and Ben Schafer (sideline)

Game information

First Quarter

- (5:10) USA – Gio Lopez 2-yard run, Laith Marjan kick (Drive: 9 plays, 74 yards, 4:05; South Alabama 7–0)

Second Quarter

- (14:54) USA – Gio Lopez 9-yard run, Laith Marjan kick (Drive: 5 plays, 90 yards, 1:52; South Alabama 14–0)
- (10:24) LA – Kenneth Almendares 35-yard field goal (Drive: 7 plays, 44 yards, 4:22; South Alabama 14–3)
- (6:18) USA – Kentrel Bullock 2-yard run, Laith Marjan kick (Drive: 10 plays, 75 yards, 4:06; South Alabama 21–3)
- (0:00) USA – Laith Marjan 35-yard field goal (Drive: 9 plays, 36 yards, 1:21; South Alabama 24–3)

Third Quarter

- (5:11) LA – Kenneth Almendares 25-yard field goal (Drive: 15 plays, 60 yards, 8:28; South Alabama 24–6)

Fourth Quarter

- (14:18) LA – Kenneth Almendares 22-yard field goal (Drive: 8 plays, 16 yards, 3:42; South Alabama 24–9)
- (8:28) LA – Dre'lyn Washington 66-yard pass from Chandler Fields, Kenneth Almendares kick (Drive: 3 plays, 82 yards, 1:02; South Alabama 24–16)
- (1:16) LA – Chandler Fields 2-yard run (Drive: 12 plays, 86 yards, 4:14; South Alabama 24–22)

Win Probability

Line

Over/Under

Statistics	USA	LA
First downs	19	22
Total yards	353	413
Rushing yards	68	137
Passing yards	285	276
Passing: Comp–Att–Int	24–34–1	22–30–1
Time of possession	27:10	32:50

Team	Category	Player	Statistics
South Alabama	Passing	Gio Lopez	24/34, 285 yards, INT
South Alabama	Rushing	Fluff Bothwell	9 carries, 38 yards
South Alabama	Receiving	Jamaal Pritchett	11 receptions, 170 yards
Louisiana	Passing	Chandler Fields	14/17, 185 yards, TD
Louisiana	Rushing	Bill Davis	16 carries, 50 yards
Louisiana	Receiving	Harvey Broussard	6 receptions, 84 yards

=== at Southern Miss ===
South Alabama Jaguars (5–5) at Southern Miss Golden Eagles (1–9)

Quarter	1	2	3	4	Total
Jaguars	0	14	14	7	35
Golden Eagles	8	3	0	3	14

at M. M. Roberts Stadium, Hattiesburg, MS

- Date: November 23
- Game time: 2:00 p.m. CDT
- Game weather: Sunny • Temperature: 65 °F (18 °C) • Wind: NW 1 mph
- Game attendance: 20,074
- Referee: Scott Broadway
- TV announcers (ESPN+): Jason Baker (play-by-play) and Austin Davis (analyst)

Game information

First Quarter

- (7:54) USM – Davis Dalton 7-yard pass from Tate Rodemaker, Reed Jesiolowski rush (Drive: 14 plays, 75 yards, 7:06; Southern Miss 8–0)

Second Quarter

- (13:29) USA – Kentrel Bullock 21-yard pass from Gio Lopez, Laith Marjan kick (Drive: 9 plays, 80 yards, 3:21; Southern Miss 8–7)
- (8:33) USA – Jeremiah Webb 32-yard pass from Gio Lopez, Laith Marjan kick (Drive: 7 plays, 77 yards, 2:44; South Alabama 14–8)
- (0:00) USM – Connor Gibbs 59-yard field goal (Drive: 1 play, 0 yards, 0:04; South Alabama 14–11)

Third Quarter

- (13:25) USA – Jamaal Pritchett 40-yard pass from Gio Lopez, Laith Marjan kick (Drive: 4 plays, 75 yards, 1:35; South Alabama 21–11)
- (2:42) USA – Wesley Miller 57-yard interception, Laith Marjan kick (South Alabama 28–11)

Fourth Quarter

- (11:34) USM – Connor Gibbs 28-yard field goal (Drive: 13 plays, 54 yards, 6:02; South Alabama 28–14)
- (8:48) USA – Fluff Bothwell 2-yard run, Laith Marjan kick (Drive: 6 plays, 75 yards, 2:46; South Alabama 35–14)

Win Probability

Line

Over/Under

Statistics	USA	USM
First downs	17	21
Total yards	380	306
Rushing yards	187	169
Passing yards	193	137
Passing: Comp–Att–Int	15–24–0	20–36–1
Time of possession	21:12	38:48

Team	Category	Player	Statistics
South Alabama	Passing	Gio Lopez	15/24, 193 yards, 3 TD
South Alabama	Rushing	Fluff Bothwell	6 carries, 104 yards, TD
South Alabama	Receiving	Jamaal Pritchett	8 receptions, 102 yards, TD
Southern Miss	Passing	Tate Rodemaker	15/27, 108 yards, TD
Southern Miss	Rushing	Rodrigues Clark	12 carries, 115 yards
Southern Miss	Receiving	Kenyon Clay	5 receptions, 39 yards

=== Texas State ===
Texas State Bobcats (6–5) at South Alabama Jaguars (6–5)

Quarter	1	2	3	4	Total
Bobcats	14	7	10	14	45
Jaguars	14	14	7	3	38

at Hancock Whitney Stadium, Mobile, Alabama

- Date: November 29
- Game time: 2:30 p.m. CDT
- Game weather: Sunny, 56 °F (13 °C)
- Game attendance: 15,569
- Referee: Trennis Livingston
- TV announcers (ESPN+): Pat Greenwood (play-by-play) and Brian Genard (analyst)
- Box score, Recap

Game information
First quarter
- TXST – Jordan McCloud 9-yard run (Mason Shipley kick), 11:53. Bobcats 7–0. Drive: 7 plays, 75 yards, 3:07.
- USA – Fluff Bothwell 51-yard run (Laith Marjan kick), 9:38. Tied 7–7. Drive: 5 plays, 75 yards, 2:15.
- USA – Blayne Myrick 33-yard interception return (Laith Marjan kick), 8:15. Jaguars 14–7.
- TXST – Brad Jackson 11-yard run (Mason Shipley kick), 4:39. Tied 14–14. Drive: 8 plays, 75 yards, 3:36.

Second quarter

- TXST – Ismail Mahdi 33-yard run (Mason Shipley kick), 8:59. Bobcats 21–14. Drive: 8 plays, 60 yards, 3:58.
- USA – Jamaal Pritchett 17-yard pass from Gio Lopez (Laith Marjan kick), 3:59. Tied 21–21. Drive: 10 plays, 75 yards, 5:00.
- USA – Gio Lopez 8-yard run (Laith Marjan kick), 2:06. Jaguars 28–21. Drive: 2 plays, 25 yards, 0:41.

Third quarter

- TXST – Lincoln Pare 1-yard run (Mason Shipley kick), 6:33. Tied 28–28. Drive: 12 plays, 66 yards, 5:33.
- TXST – Mason Shipley 32-yard field goal, 2:49. Bobcats 31–28. Drive: 6 plays, 14 yards, 2:25.
- USA – Fluff Bothwell 29-yard run (Laith Marjan kick), 1:44. Jaguars 35–31. Drive: 3 plays, 75 yards, 1:05.

Fourth quarter

- TXST – Joey Hobert 18-yard pass from Jordan McCloud (Mason Shipley kick), 11:39. Bobcats 38–35. Drive: 12 plays, 90 yards, 4:58.
- TXST – Mannie Nunnery 60-yard interception return (Mason Shipley kick), 7:27. Bobcats 45–35.
- USA – Laith Marjan 21-yard field goal, 1:34. Bobcats 45–38. Drive: 14 plays, 74 yards, 5:49.

Statistics	TXST	USA
First downs	28	19
Total yards	530	377
Rushing yards	282	147
Passing yards	248	230
Turnovers	2	3
Time of possession	35:25	24:35

Team	Category	Player	Statistics
Texas State	Passing	Jordan McCloud	21/28, 248 yards, TD, 2 INT
Texas State	Rushing	Ismail Mahdi	20 carries, 147 yards, TD
Texas State	Receiving	Joey Hobert	7 receptions, 80 yards, TD
South Alabama	Passing	Gio Lopez	16/23, 190 yards, TD, 2 INT
South Alabama	Rushing	Fluff Bothwell	6 carries, 81 yards, 2 TD
South Alabama	Receiving	Jamaal Pritchett	10 receptions, 85 yards, TD

=== Western Michigan (Salute to Veterans Bowl) ===
2024 IS4S Salute to Veterans Bowl
South Alabama Jaguars (6–6, 5–3) at Western Michigan Broncos (6–6, 5–3)

Quarter	1	2	3	4	Total
Jaguars	0	16	7	7	30
Broncos	7	6	0	10	23

at Cramton Bowl, Montgomery, Alabama

- Date: December 14th, 2024
- Game time: 9:00 p.m. EST
- Game weather: Overcast • Temperature: 63 °F (17 °C) • Wind: ESE 11 mph
- Game attendance: 12,021
- Referee: Cal McNeill
- TV announcers (ESPN): Wes Durham (play-by-play), Tom Luginbill (analyst), and Dana Boyle (sideline)

Game information

First Quarter

- (10:31) WMU – Jalen Buckley 1 yard rush, Luka Zurak kick (Drive: 5 plays, 71 yards, 2:36; Western Michigan 7–0)

Second Quarter

- (14:50) WMU – Luke Zurak 37 yard field goal (Drive: 12 plays, 61 yards, 6:23; Western Michigan 10–0)
- (12:15) USA – Hamilton DiBoyan 24 yard field goal (Drive: 9 plays, 69 yards, 2:35; Western Michigan 10–3)
- (10:29) USA – Jeremiah Webb 52 yard pass from Bishop Davenport, Hamilton DiBoyan kick (Drive: 2 plays, 80 yards, 0:35; Tied 10–10)
- (4:50) USA – Jeremiah Webb 45 yard pass from Bishop Davenport, Hamilton DiBoyan kick no good (Drive: 9 plays, 80 yards, 4:06; South Alabama 16–10)
- (0:13) WMU – Luka Zurak 29 yard field goal (Drive: 5 plays, 11 yards, 1:12; South Alabama 16–13)

Third Quarter

- (4:18) USA – Bishop Davenport 50 yard rush, Hamilton DiBoyan kick (Drive: 8 plays, 90 yards, 4:04; South Alabama 23–13)

Fourth Quarter

- (6:17) WMU – Anthony Sambucci 7 yard pass from Hayden Wolff, Luka Zurak kick (Drive: 9 plays, 75 yards, 5:07; South Alabama 23–20)
- (2:42) USA – Kentrel Bullock 22 yard rush, Hamilton DiBoyan kick (Drive: 8 plays, 75 yards, 3:35; South Alabama 30–20)
- (1:11) WMU – Luka Zurak 48 yard field goal (Drive: 8 plays, 40 yards, 1:31; South Alabama 30–23)

Statistics	USA	WMU
First downs	25	21
Total yards	537	317
Rushing yards	266	121
Passing yards	271	196
Passing: Comp–Att–Int	15–24–1	17–27–1
Time of possession	27:56	32:04

Team	Category	Player	Statistics
South Alabama	Passing	Bishop Davenport	15/24, 271 yards, 2 TD, INT
South Alabama	Rushing	Kentrel Bullock	17 carries, 130 yards, TD
South Alabama	Receiving	Jeremiah Webb	6 receptions, 182 yards, 2 TD
Western Michigan	Passing	Hayden Wolff	17/27, 196 yards, TD, INT
Western Michigan	Rushing	Jaden Nixon	11 carries, 45 yards
Western Michigan	Receiving	Kenneth Womack	5 receptions, 89 yards
