= Maleki Harris =

American football player (born 1992)

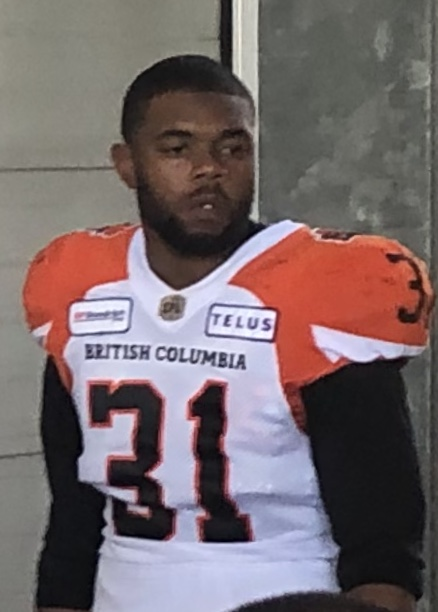
- Harris with the BC Lions in 2019

No. 51, 37, 31
- Position: Linebacker

Personal information
- Born: November 21, 1992 (age 33); Tuscaloosa, Alabama, U.S.
- Listed height: 6 ft 0 in (1.83 m)
- Listed weight: 210 lb (95 kg)

Career information
- High school: Cordova (Cordova, Alabama)
- College: South Alabama (2011–2014)
- NFL draft: 2015: undrafted

Career history
- Calgary Stampeders (2015–2018); BC Lions (2019)

Awards and highlights
- Grey Cup champion (2018); Second-team All-Sun Belt (2014)
- Stats at CFL.ca

Julian Maleki Harris (mah-LEEK; born November 21, 1992) is an American former professional football linebacker who played five seasons in the Canadian Football League (CFL) with the Calgary Stampeders and BC Lions. He played college football at South Alabama.

== Early life ==
Julian Maleki Harris was born on November 21, 1992, in Tuscaloosa, Alabama. He played high school football at Cordova High School in Cordova, Alabama. As a senior in 2010, he posted 136 tackles, 12 sacks, two forced fumbles, one fumble recovery, and five interceptions on defense while also catching 28 passes for 563 yards and eight touchdowns on offense. He earned Mobile Press-Register first-team 3A all-state honors for the 2010 season. In the class of 2011, Rivals.com rated Harris the No. 33 player in Alabama and the No. 36 outside linebacker in the country. He also participated in basketball and track in high school. Harris had college football offers from Illinois, Kansas, Louisiana Tech, Southern Miss, UAB, Memphis, and South Alabama.

== College career ==
Harris chose to attend the University of South Alabama to play for the Jaguars. He played in eight games as a true freshman in 2011, posting seven tackles and one forced fumble. He appeared in all 13 games during the 2012 season, recording 20 tackles, two fumble recoveries, one pass breakup, and one blocked kick. Both of Harris' fumble recoveries were in one game, setting a single-game school record. He played in all 12 games, starting ten, his junior year in 2013, totaling 63 tackles, 2.5 sacks, two fumble recoveries, one interception, and seven pass breakups.

On September 13, 2014, Harris posted 14 tackles and tied a school record by forcing two fumbles, earning Sun Belt Conference Defensive Player of the Week honors. On October 4 against Appalachian State, Harris was ejected for targeting. Following his ejection, he reacted improperly to fans and was then suspended by head coach Joey Jones for the first half of the next game. Harris played in 12 games, starting 11, overall as a senior in 2014, recording 47 solo tackles, 45 assisted tackles, one sack, four forced fumbles, three fumble recoveries, one interception, and six pass breakups. Harris' four forced fumbles were the most in the Sun Belt. He was named second-team All-Sun Belt for his performance during the 2014 season. He majored in leisure studies at South Alabama.

== Professional career ==
=== Calgary Stampeders ===
After going undrafted in the 2015 NFL draft, Harris signed with the Calgary Stampeders of the Canadian Football League in May 2015. He spent part of his rookie year on the practice roster and dressed in seven games overall, posting eight tackles on defense, two special teams tackles, one forced fumble, and one interception.

Harris dressed in 16 games in 2016 while missing two games due to injury, recording one defensive tackle and 16 special teams tackles.

Harris began the 2017 season as a starter at weakside linebacker due to an injury to Deron Mayo. Harris dressed in six games, all starts, in 2017 and missed the rest of the year due to injury. Overall, he totaled 21 tackles on defense, two special teams tackles, one sack, one fumble recovery for a 46-yard touchdown, and one interception for a 27-yard touchdown. He was the first Stampeder since Alondra Johnson in 1991 to have both a fumble return touchdown and a pick-six in the same season.

Harris became a free agent after the 2017 season and re-signed with Calgary on March 19, 2018. He missed most the 2018 season due to injury as well, only dressing in five games while posting five defensive tackles and two special teams tackles. On November 25, 2018, the Stampeders won the 106th Grey Cup against the Ottawa Redblacks by a score of 27–16.

=== BC Lions ===
Harris became a free agent after the 2018 season, and signed a one-year contract with the BC Lions on February 14, 2019. He dressed in a career-high 17 games, starting 16, in 2019, totaling 67 defensive tackles, two special teams tackles, one fumble recovery, one interception, and one pass breakup. Harris also missed one game due to injury. The Lions finished the year with a 5–13 record.
