= Cordy Glenn =

American football player (born 1989)

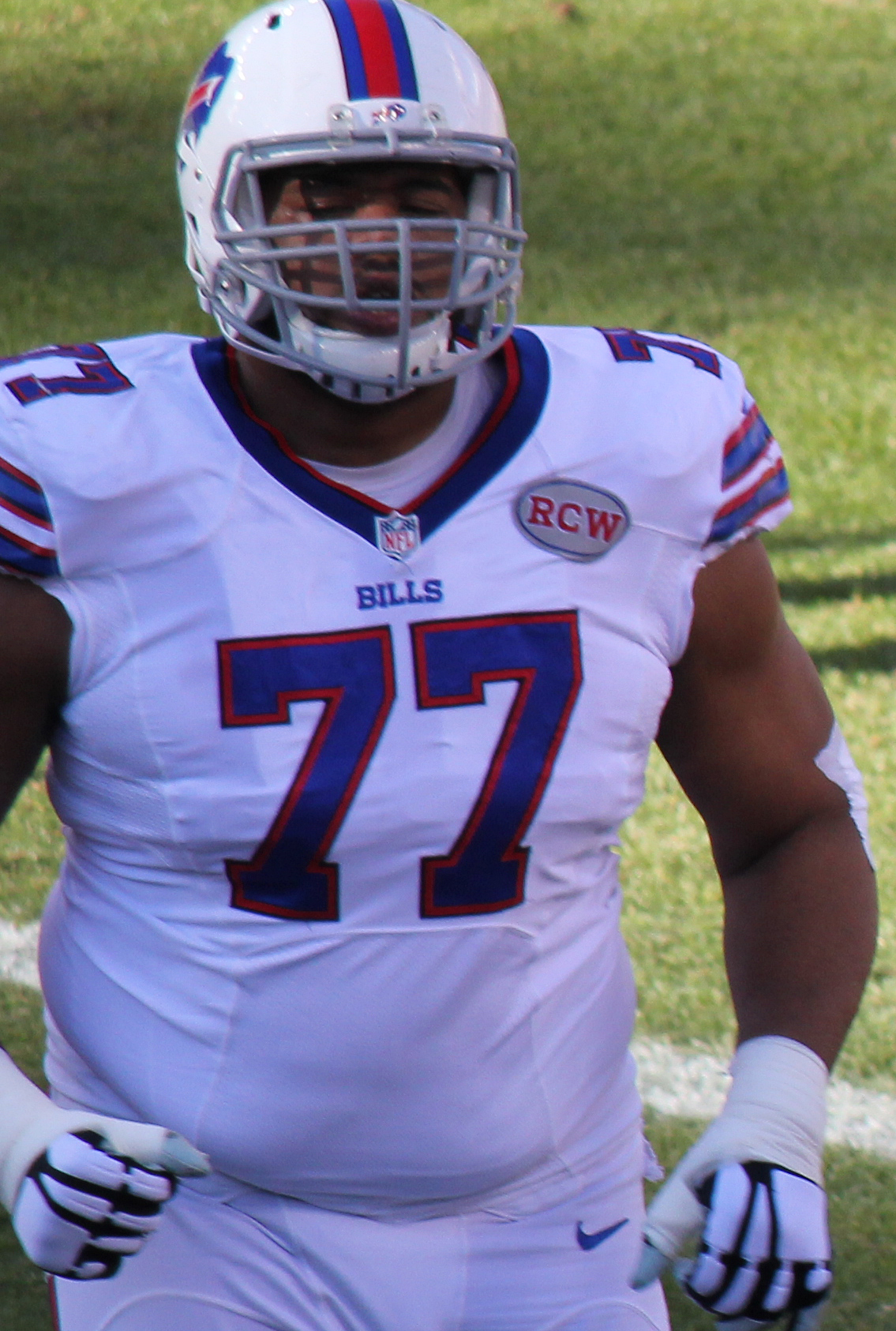
- Glenn with the Buffalo Bills in 2014

No. 77
- Position: Guard / Tackle

Personal information
- Born: September 18, 1989 (age 37); Riverdale, Georgia, U.S.
- Listed height: 6 ft 6 in (1.98 m)
- Listed weight: 345 lb (156 kg)

Career information
- High school: Riverdale
- College: Georgia (2008–2011)
- NFL draft: 2012: 2nd round, 41st overall pick

Career history
- Buffalo Bills (2012–2017); Cincinnati Bengals (2018–2019)

Awards and highlights
- First-team All-American (2010); Freshman All-American (2008); First-team All-SEC (2011)

Career NFL statistics
- Games played: 97
- Games started: 95
- Stats at Pro Football Reference

Cordy Glenn (born September 18, 1989) is an American former professional football player who was an offensive tackle in the National Football League (NFL). He played college football for the Georgia Bulldogs. Glenn earned a 2010 All-American selection and was considered one of the best offensive guards of his class by NFLdraftscout.com. He was selected by the Buffalo Bills in the second round of the 2012 NFL draft. He also played for the Cincinnati Bengals.

== Early life ==
Glenn attended Riverdale High School, where he was a two-way lineman and a teammate of Will Rackley. Regarded as a four-star recruit by Rivals.com, Glenn was listed as the No. 16 offensive guard prospect in the class of 2008.

== College career ==
As a true freshman, Glenn appeared in 13 games making 10 starts, and was named to College Football News's All-Freshman First-team.

Glenn ranks tied first all-time at UGA in career starts by an offensive lineman with 50 (tied with Clint Boling), of which 28 were at left guard, 18 at left tackle and four at right guard.

== Professional career ==
=== Pre-draft ===
Pre-draft measurables
| Height | Weight | Arm length | Hand span | Wingspan | 40-yard dash | 10-yard split | 20-yard split | 20-yard shuttle | Three-cone drill | Vertical jump | Broad jump | Bench press |
|---|---|---|---|---|---|---|---|---|---|---|---|---|
| 6 ft 5 3/4 in (1.97 m) | 345 lb (156 kg) | 35 3/4 in (0.91 m) | 10 1/8 in (0.26 m) | 7 ft 0 7/8 in (2.16 m) | 5.15 s | 1.84 s | 2.95 s | 5.00 s | 8.13 s | 23.5 in (0.60 m) | 7 ft 9 in (2.36 m) | 31 reps |
All values from NFL Combine

Glenn was regarded by Frank Cooney of NFLDraftScout.com as the No. 2 guard available in the 2012 NFL draft, behind David DeCastro.

=== Buffalo Bills ===
Glenn was selected by the Buffalo Bills in the second round (41st pick overall).

On September 9, 2012, Glenn started at left tackle and helped block for a rushing attack in which C.J. Spiller rushed for a career-high 169 yards against the New York Jets. Glenn became first Bills rookie to start at left tackle in a season opener since Glenn Parker in 1990. On September 16, 2012, Glenn and his offense did not allow a sack for the second straight week against the Kansas City Chiefs. It was the second time in team history the offensive line held opponents to zero sacks in the first two games of a season. The last time was during the 1980 season. On November 11, 2012, Glenn was part of an offense that produced season bests of 481 total yards and a time of possession of 33:50 against the New England Patriots. At the end of the 2012 season, Glenn started all 13 games he played. Glenn was part of an offensive line that held opponents to 30 sacks (5th fewest in the AFC), while blocking for a rushing attack that averaged 138.6 yards per game. (2nd in the AFC.)

On November 3, 2013, Glenn started at left tackle for an offensive line that did not give up a sack or quarterback hit and blocked for a rushing attack that recorded a season-high 241 yards rushing against the Kansas City Chiefs. At the end of the 2013 season, Glenn started all 16 games for the first time in his career. Glenn blocked for just the second Bills running back duo in franchise history to exceed 800 yards a piece on the ground (Fred Jackson & C.J. Spiller).

Glenn started all 16 games for the second time in his career in 2014, and he would accomplish the feat again in the 2015 season.

On May 3, 2016, Glenn agreed to terms with the Bills on a five-year contract extension worth $65 million.

Glenn's 2017 season was plagued by foot and ankle injuries, only playing six games before being placed on injured reserve on December 15, 2017.

=== Cincinnati Bengals ===
On March 12, 2018, the Bills agreed to trade Glenn, the 21st overall pick in the 2018 NFL draft, and a 2018 fifth round pick to the Cincinnati Bengals in exchange for the 2018 12th overall pick and a 2018 sixth round pick. The deal became official on March 14, 2018, at the start of the NFL year. He was named the Bengals starting left tackle, starting 13 games, missing three due to injury.

After drafting Jonah Williams in the first round in 2019, Glenn was moved to left guard. However, he was moved back to left tackle after Williams suffered a season-ending injury. On September 13, 2019, Glenn was ruled out for Week 2 after suffering a concussion during the Bengals' 2nd preseason game. On October 18, 2019, he was suspended for week 7 by the Bengals for disciplinary reasons related to treatment for his concussion. He was activated from suspension on October 21, 2019.

Glenn was released on March 13, 2020.
