= List of Lehigh Mountain Hawks in the NFL draft =

This is a list of Lehigh Mountain Hawks football players in the NFL draft.

== Key ==
B	Back	K	Kicker	NT	Nose tackle
C	Center	LB	Linebacker	FB	Fullback
DB	Defensive back	P	Punter	HB	Halfback
DE	Defensive end	QB	Quarterback	WR	Wide receiver
DT	Defensive tackle	RB	Running back	G	Guard
E	End	T	Offensive tackle	TE	Tight end

== Selections ==
Year	Round	Pick	Overall	Player	Team	Position
1949	24	9	240	Stan Szymakowski	Chicago Cardinals	B
1950	25	7	320	Bob Numbers	Pittsburgh Steelers	C
1951	4	4	42	Dick Doyne	Chicago Cardinals	B
1951	23	5	272	Dick Gabriel	Detroit Lions	B
1958	4	3	40	Dan Nolan	Washington Redskins	QB
1958	12	10	143	Pete Williams	San Francisco 49ers	T
1959	22	11	263	Joe Wenzel	Cleveland Browns	E
1962	9	13	125	Reed Bohovich	New York Giants	T
1964	19	10	262	Don Marshall	Pittsburgh Steelers	T
1971	13	14	326	Thad Jamula	Cleveland Browns	T
1972	6	2	132	John Hill	New York Giants	C
1974	3	17	69	Kim McQuilken	Atlanta Falcons	QB
1976	14	12	387	Jerry Mullane	New York Giants	LB
1978	6	4	142	Mike Rieker	New Orleans Saints	QB
1979	6	2	139	Steve Kreider	Cincinnati Bengals	WR
1995	5	18	152	Rich Owens	Washington Redskins	DE
2011	3	12	76	Will Rackley	Jacksonville Jaguars	G
