= OCSD (disambiguation) =

The Orange County Sheriff's Department is the law enforcement agency serving Orange County, California.

OCSD may also refer to:

== Education ==
- Ocean City School District, Ocean City, New Jersey
- Oelwein Community School District, Oelwein, Iowa
- Ogden City School District, Ogden, Utah
- Okaloosa County School District, Okaloosa County, Florida
- Oktibbeha County School District, Oktibbeha County, Mississippi
- Okoboji Community School District, Milford, Iowa
- Oneonta City School District, Blount County, Alabama
- Oregon City School District (Ohio), Lucas County, Ohio
- Oregon City School District (Oregon), Oregon City, Oregon
- Ottumwa Community School District, Ottumwa, Iowa

== Other ==
- Orange County Sanitation District, a public sanitation agency in Orange County, California
- Obsessive–compulsive spectrum disorder, a model of mental classification for obsessive–compulsive disorders
