= Laith Marjan =

American football player (born 2003)

Profile
- Position: Placekicker

Personal information
- Listed height: 6 ft 2 in (1.88 m)
- Listed weight: 210 lb (95 kg)

Career information
- High school: Enloe (Raleigh, North Carolina)
- College: East Carolina (2021–2023); South Alabama (2024); Kansas (2025)
- NFL draft: 2026: undrafted

Career history
- Pittsburgh Steelers (2026)*
- * Offseason or practice squad member only

Awards and highlights
- Second team All-Sun Belt (2024); Third-team All-Big 12 (2025)

Laith Alexander Marjan is an American professional football kicker. He played college football for the East Carolina Pirates, Kansas Jayhawks, and for the South Alabama Jaguars.

== Early life ==
Marjan attended Enloe High School in Raleigh, North Carolina, and committed to play college football for the East Carolina Pirates.

== College career ==
=== East Carolina ===
As a freshman in 2021, Marjan redshirted. He then played in 17 games across 2022 and 2023 as the team's kickoff specialist, not attempting any kicks. After the 2023 season, Marjan entered the NCAA transfer portal.

=== South Alabama ===
Marjan transferred to play for the South Alabama Jaguars. In 2024, he converted on 16 of 17 field goal attempts. After the season, Marjan once again entered the NCAA transfer portal.

=== Kansas ===
Marjan transferred to play for the Kansas Jayhawks. Heading into the 2025 season, he won the Jayhawks starting kicker job. Marjan finished the 2025 season, going 14 for 17 on field goal attempts, while making all 40 of his extra points.

=== Statistics ===
Year	Team	GP	Overall FGs				PATs			Total points
Year	Team	GP	Lng	FGA	FGM	Pct	XPA	XPM	Pct	Total points
2021	East Carolina	0	DNP							
2022	East Carolina	3	–	0	0	–	0	0	–	0
2023	East Carolina	12	–	0	0	–	0	0	–	0
2024	South Alabama	12	49	17	16	94.1	44	42	95.5	90
2025	Kansas	12	55	17	14	82.4	40	40	100.0	82
Career		39	55	34	30	88.2	84	82	97.6	172

== Professional career ==
Pre-draft measurables
Height	Weight	Arm length	Hand span	Wingspan
6 ft 2 1/8 in (1.88 m)	205 lb (93 kg)	31 1/2 in (0.80 m)	9 5/8 in (0.24 m)	6 ft 5 5/8 in (1.97 m)
All values from Pro Day

After not being selected in the 2026 NFL draft, Marjan signed with the Pittsburgh Steelers as an undrafted free agent. He was waived on August 23.

== Personal life ==
Marjan is Arab American; his father was born in Kuwait. His first name means "lion" in Arabic.
