= Michael Ola =

American football player (born 1988)

No. 70, 74, 65
- Position: Offensive tackle

Personal information
- Born: April 19, 1988 (age 38); Riverdale, Georgia, U.S.
- Listed height: 6 ft 5 in (1.96 m)
- Listed weight: 312 lb (142 kg)

Career information
- High school: Riverdale
- College: Hampton (2006–2010)
- NFL draft: 2011: undrafted

Career history
- Jacksonville Sharks (2012); Montreal Alouettes (2012–2013); Miami Dolphins (2014)*; Chicago Bears (2014); San Diego Chargers (2015); Detroit Lions (2015); Seattle Seahawks (2016)*; New York Giants (2016)*; Buffalo Bills (2016); Los Angeles Chargers (2017); New Orleans Saints (2018–2019)
- * Offseason or practice squad member only

Career NFL statistics
- Games played: 40
- Games started: 20
- Stats at Pro Football Reference
- Stats at CFL.ca (archive)
- Stats at ArenaFan.com

Michael Ola (born April 19, 1988) is an American former professional football player who was an offensive tackle in the National Football League (NFL). He played college football for the Hampton Pirates and attended Riverdale High School in Riverdale, Georgia. He was also a member of the Jacksonville Sharks, Montreal Alouettes, Miami Dolphins, Chicago Bears, San Diego Chargers, Detroit Lions, Seattle Seahawks, New York Giants, Buffalo Bills, Los Angeles Chargers, and New Orleans Saints.

== Professional career ==
=== Jacksonville Sharks ===
Ola was signed by the Jacksonville Sharks on March 3, 2012. He was released on June 11, 2012.

=== Montreal Alouettes ===
Ola signed with the Montreal Alouettes on June 10, 2012. He played for the Alouettes during the 2012 and 2013 CFL seasons.

=== Miami Dolphins ===
Ola was signed to a futures contract by the Miami Dolphins on February 7, 2014. He was released by the Dolphins on May 25, 2014.

=== Chicago Bears ===
Ola signed with the Chicago Bears on May 28, 2014. He made his NFL debut on September 7 against the Buffalo Bills, and made his first career start the following week against the San Francisco 49ers, replacing the injured Matt Slauson. In the 2014 season, he started at four of the five offensive line positions. Ola was released by the Bears on September 5, 2015.

=== San Diego Chargers ===
Ola was signed to the San Diego Chargers' practice squad on September 7, 2015. He was signed to the active roster on October 3, following the Chargers release of running back Donald Brown.

=== Detroit Lions ===
Ola was signed by the Detroit Lions on October 20, 2015. On September 3, 2016, he was waived by the Lions.

=== Seattle Seahawks ===
On September 13, 2016, Ola was signed to the Seahawks' practice squad. He was released on September 21, 2016.

=== New York Giants ===
On September 21, 2016, Ola was signed to the Giants' practice squad.

=== Buffalo Bills ===
On September 28, 2016, Ola was signed by the Bills off the Giants' practice squad. He was released by the Bills on October 25, 2016, and was re-signed to the practice squad two days later. He was promoted back to the active roster on December 13, 2016.

On September 2, 2017, Ola was waived/injured by the Bills and placed on injured reserve. He was released on September 6, 2017.

=== Los Angeles Chargers ===
On October 24, 2017, Ola signed with the Los Angeles Chargers.

=== New Orleans Saints ===
On May 14, 2018, Ola signed with the New Orleans Saints. He was released on September 12, 2018. He was re-signed on October 18, 2018. He suffered a high ankle sprain in Week 14 and was placed on injured reserve on December 11, 2018.

On February 19, 2019, Ola re-signed with the Saints. He was released on August 31, 2019. He was re-signed on December 6, 2019. He was released on December 28, 2019.
