= Will Rackley =

American football player (born 1989)

No. 65
- Position: Guard

Personal information
- Born: October 11, 1989 (age 37); Athens, Greece
- Listed height: 6 ft 3 in (1.91 m)
- Listed weight: 318 lb (144 kg)

Career information
- High school: Riverdale (Riverdale, Georgia)
- College: Lehigh
- NFL draft: 2011: 3rd round, 76th overall pick

Career history
- Jacksonville Jaguars (2011–2013); Baltimore Ravens (2014)

Awards and highlights
- 3× First-team All-Patriot League (2008−2010)

Career NFL statistics
- Games played: 26
- Games started: 25
- Stats at Pro Football Reference

William Rackley III (born October 11, 1989) is an American former professional football player who was an offensive guard in the National Football League (NFL). He was selected by the Jacksonville Jaguars in the third round of the 2011 NFL draft. He played college football for the Lehigh Mountain Hawks.

== Early life ==
Rackley was born in Athens, Greece. He attended Riverdale High School in Riverdale, Georgia, where he was a teammate of Cordy Glenn. He played football at Riverdale, earned first-team all-area honors as an offensive lineman and second-team all-area honors as a defensive lineman. He was recruited by Lehigh University, Lafayette College, Colgate University, and Georgia Tech, but ultimately chose to attend Lehigh. While at Lehigh, he was a member of Delta Upsilon fraternity.

== College career ==
Rackley started in every game for the Mountain Hawks in each of his four seasons, the only one to do so in the last 20 years at Lehigh outside of Langston Jones (2025). Rackley started for coach Andy Coen in 2007, the first freshman to start at offensive line under Coen. Rackley earned first-team All-Patriot League honors from 2008 to 2010. He received his Bachelor of Arts in Design from Lehigh on May 23, 2011.

== Professional career ==
=== Pre-draft ===
Along with David Arkin, Ben Ijalana, and Brandon Fusco, Rackley was considered one of the best small-school offensive line prospects.

Pre-draft measurables
Height	Weight	Arm length	Hand span	Wingspan	40-yard dash	10-yard split	20-yard split	20-yard shuttle	Three-cone drill	Vertical jump	Broad jump	Bench press
6 ft 3 1/4 in (1.91 m)	309 lb (140 kg)	33 1/4 in (0.84 m)	10 3/8 in (0.26 m)	6 ft 7 3/8 in (2.02 m)	5.39 s	1.79 s	3.09 s	4.78 s	7.91 s	27.0 in (0.69 m)	8 ft 3 in (2.51 m)	29 reps
All values from NFL Scouting Combine/Pro Day

=== Jacksonville Jaguars ===
Rackley was selected in the third round with the 76th overall pick in the 2011 NFL draft by the Jacksonville Jaguars. He played 15 games in his rookie season, including 14 starts at left guard. In the 2012 preseason, right tackle Eben Britton was moved to Rackley's position of left guard. Rackley was then expected to contribute as a backup guard and center before suffering an injury. Rackley spent the 2012 season on injured reserve. In 2013, Rackley returned to the starting left guard position. He was placed on injured reserve on December 17, 2013.

Rackley was released by the Jaguars on May 12, 2014.

=== Baltimore Ravens ===
Rackley signed with the Baltimore Ravens on May 19, 2014. The Ravens placed Rackley on injured reserve on August 25, 2014, with a concussion.
