= Tremel States-Jones =

Canadian-American football player (born 2003)

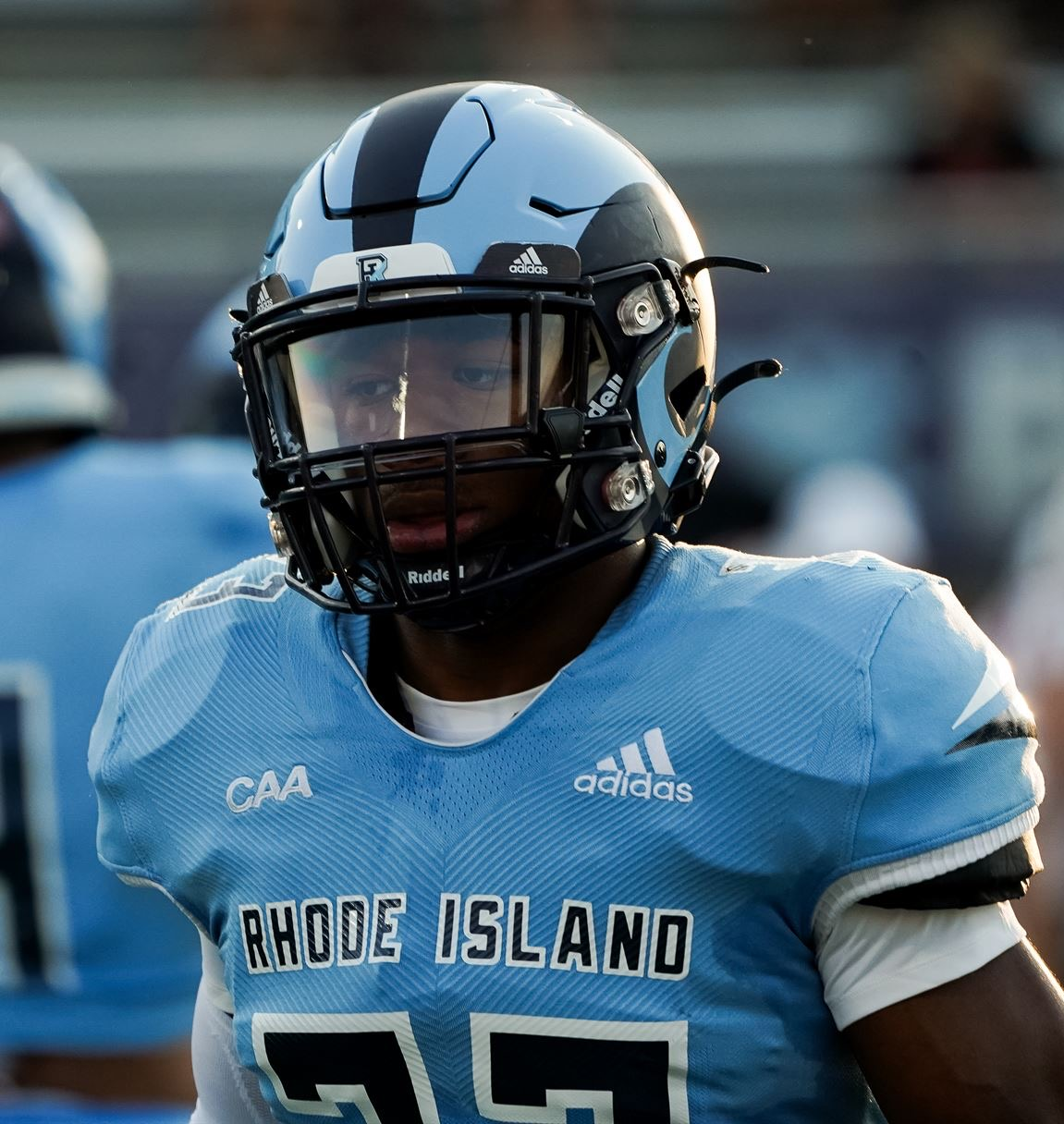

No. 23 – Rhode Island Rams
- Position: Defensive back
- Class: Junior

Personal information
- Born: December 24, 2003 (age 22); Surrey, British Columbia, Canada
- Listed height: 6 ft 0 in (1.83 m)
- Listed weight: 200 lb (91 kg)

Career information
- High school: Lord Tweedsmuir Secondary School (Surrey, BC) (2016–2019); Clearwater Academy International (Clearwater, Florida) (2020–2021)
- College: South Alabama (2022–2023); Rhode Island (2024–present)
- Stats at ESPN

Tremel Anthony-Lamont States-Jones (born December 24, 2003) is a Canadian college football defensive back for the Rhode Island Rams. He previously played for the South Alabama Jaguars.

== Early life ==
Tremel States-Jones grew up in Surrey, British Columbia, and attended Lord Tweedsmuir Secondary School. During the COVID-19 pandemic in July 2020, he was recruited and transitioned to complete high school at Clearwater Academy International (CAI) in Clearwater, Florida. He had an impressive high school career in both Canada and the USA, where he played a pivotal role in leading his CAI team to the 2021 state championship. During his final year playing in Canada, he amassed over 1,100 yards and 14 total touchdowns from scrimmage, recording 700 rushing yards (10 touchdowns), 59 tackles, two sacks and three interceptions. Over the course of his high school career in Florida, he recorded 21 solo tackles, 36 total tackles, a sack and an interception, marking him as a standout defensive player. He was rated a three-star recruit and committed to play college football at South Alabama over offers like Liberty, UMass, Brown, UT Martin, Stetson, Morehead State, Bryant and Charleston Southern.

== College career ==
=== South Alabama ===
After high school, States-Jones committed to the University of South Alabama.

During States-Jones' true freshman season in 2022, he appeared in nine games, both as a backup safety and on special teams. Recorded one tackle at Nicholls (Sept. 3).

During the 2023 season, he did not see any action due to an injury.

On April 23, 2024, States-Jones announced that he would enter the transfer portal and would receive offers from Rhode Island, Campbell, Southeastern Louisiana, Jackson State, Tennessee Tech and Maine.

=== Rhode Island ===
On May 5, 2024, States-Jones committed and transferred to the University of Rhode Island, where he joined the Rams’ football program.
