= Don Barclay =

Don Barclay may refer to:

- Don Barclay (actor) (1892–1975), American actor
- Don Barclay (American football) (born 1989), American football offensive tackle and guard
