= Fluff Bothwell =

American football player

- Bothwell in 2026

No. 24 – Mississippi State Bulldogs
- Position: Running back
- Class: Junior

Personal information
- Listed height: 5 ft 10 in (1.78 m)
- Listed weight: 230 lb (104 kg)

Career information
- High school: Oneonta (Oneonta, Alabama)
- College: South Alabama (2024); Mississippi State (2025–present)

Awards and highlights
- Third-team All-Sun Belt (2024)
- Stats at ESPN

Da'Marion "Fluff" Bothwell is an American college football running back for the Mississippi State Bulldogs. He previously played for the South Alabama Jaguars.

== Early life ==
Bothwell attended and played football at Oneonta High School in Oneonta, Alabama. As a junior he rushed for 3,112 yards and 41 touchdowns on 256 carries and caught 22 passes for 314 yards and two touchdowns, while also returning a punt for a touchdown and adding 66 tackles, including 19 for a loss, and five sacks on defense. Coming out of high school, Bothwell was rated as a three-star recruit and committed to play college football for the South Alabama Jaguars.

== College career ==
=== South Alabama ===
In Bothwell's collegiate debut in the 2024 season opener, he rushed for 30 yards and a touchdown and made a 28-yard catch versus North Texas. In week 3, he averaged over 20 yards a carry rushing for 143 yards and two touchdowns in a win over Northwestern State. In week 4, Bothwell rushed for 116 yards and two touchdowns in a win over Appalachian State.

On December 8, 2024, Bothwell announced that he would enter the transfer portal.

=== Mississippi State ===
On December 24, 2024, Bothwell announced that he would transfer to Mississippi State.

== Personal life ==
Bothwell's family's home burned down Christmas Eve 2023.
