= Bubba Thomas =

American football player (born 2000)

Profile
- Position: Nose tackle

Personal information
- Born: July 5, 2000 (age 26); Americus, Georgia, U.S.
- Listed height: 6 ft 1 in (1.85 m)
- Listed weight: 301 lb (137 kg)

Career information
- High school: Riverdale (Riverdale, Georgia)
- College: South Alabama (2019–2024)
- NFL draft: 2025: undrafted

Career history
- Seattle Seahawks (2025–2026)*
- * Offseason or practice squad member only

Awards and highlights
- Super Bowl champion (LX); Second-team All-Sun Belt (2024); Third-team All-Sun Belt (2023)
- Stats at Pro Football Reference

Wy'Kevious Da'von "Bubba" Thomas (born July 5, 2000) is an American professional football nose tackle. He played college football for the South Alabama Jaguars.

== Early life ==
Thomas grew up in Riverdale, Georgia and attended Riverdale High School, where he was a four-year starter and letterwinner on the football team. Throughout his high school career, he was an all-region selection each season. As a senior, he recorded 48 tackles, including 13 for loss, earning first-team all-region honors. His performance helped lead the Raiders to an 8–4 record and a berth in the Georgia Class 5A state playoffs. He was a two-star rated recruit and committed to play college football at the University of South Alabama.

== College career ==
Thomas played for six seasons at University of South Alabama. During Thomas's true freshman season in 2019, while he was redshirted, he did see play in the final four games of the year making his collegiate debut against Texas State. He finished the season with a solo tackle against Arkansas State.

During the 2020 season, he played in all 11 games, finishing the season with 12 posted stops, two tackles for loss and a sack.

Thomas was a starter for the Jaguars all four years from 2021 to 2024. During the 2021 season, he played in and started all 12 games, finishing the season with 49 total tackles (20 solo and 29 assisted), 5.5 tackles for loss including 2.5 sacks, two fumble recoveries and three quarterback hurries.

During the 2022 season, he played in all 13 games and started 12 of them, finishing the season with 35 recorded tackles (15 solo and 20 assisted), five tackles for loss, three sacks and one forced fumble.

During the 2023 season, he played in and started all 13 games, finishing the season with 38 total tackles (11 solo and 27 assisted), 2.5 tackles for loss, a sack and a quarterback hurry. He would record two of those tackles in the 2023 68 Ventures Bowl.

During the 2024 season, he played in and started all 13 games, finishing the season with 41 total tackles (10 solo and 31 assisted), one pass breakup and one tackle for loss.

== Professional career ==
Pre-draft measurables
Height	Weight	Arm length	Hand span	Wingspan	40-yard dash	10-yard split	20-yard split	20-yard shuttle	Three-cone drill	Vertical jump	Broad jump	Bench press
6 ft 1 5/8 in (1.87 m)	301 lb (137 kg)	32 1/2 in (0.83 m)	9 1/2 in (0.24 m)	6 ft 8 3/4 in (2.05 m)	5.20 s	1.76 s	3.02 s	4.64 s	7.55 s	26.0 in (0.66 m)	8 ft 5 in (2.57 m)	30 reps
All values from Pro Day

Thomas signed with the Seattle Seahawks as an undrafted free agent on May 2, 2025. He was released by the Seahawks on August 26, as a part of roster cutdowns prior to the start of the regular season. Thomas was re-signed to the team's practice squad on November 12.

On February 12, 2026, Thomas signed a reserve/futures contract with Seattle. On August 30, he was waived by the Seahawks as a part of final roster cuts.
