= Oneonta High School (Alabama) =

Secondary school in Oneonta, Alabama

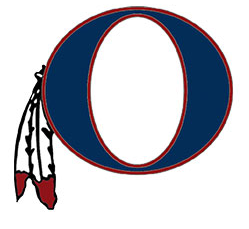

Location
- 27605 Alabama 75; Oneonta, Blount County, Alabama 35121; United States
- 33.9341559°N 86.4968884°W

Information
- Former name: Blount County High School
- Type: Public
- Motto: Committed to Excellence
- Established: 1893
- Status: Continuing
- School board: Oneonta City Board of Education
- NCES District ID: 0102550
- Superintendent: Mr. Craig Sosebee
- CEEB code: 012040
- NCES School ID: 010255001064
- Principal: Mrs. Misty Sandlin
- Grades: 9-12
- Gender: Coeducational
- Student to teacher ratio: 17:1
- Colors: White, maroon, and dark slate blue.
- Athletics: Baseball, Basketball, Cross Country, Football, Golf, Soccer, Softball, Swimming, Tennis, Track & Field, and Volleyball.
- Mascot: Redskins
- Rival: Susan Moore High School
- USNWR ranking: 2,545
- Website: https://ochs.oneontacityschools.com/

Oneonta High School is a secondary school in Oneonta, Alabama. It is the only high school in the Oneonta City School District. It was founded in 1893 incorporated in 1900. Redskins are the school mascot.

== History ==
The school opened on September 4, 1893. H. E. Moss was principal until his death in 1898. Hubert Street served as its principal. T. G. Whaley was principal in 1908.

A few hundred yards south of the high school is the William Cornelius Family Cemetery.

The school's marching band, the Redskin Marching Band, was founded in 1941 and hosts the annual Covered Bridge Marching Festival.

Students from the school have visited mines in the area to look for plant and animal fossils. In 1999, a science teacher from the school discovered important tracks at one site. The site is now the Stephen C. Minkin Paleozoic Footprint Site.

On September 22, 2006, the school, its football field, and auxiliary structures around the field were damaged in a tornado.

== Athletics ==
The school won state championships in boys golf in 2012, boy's individual track and field in 2013, football in 1951, 1971, 1972, 2004 and 2013, girls' basketball in 2013 and 2014.

== Alumni ==
- Bill Armstrong, McNeese State men's basketball coach
- Fluff Bothwell, football player
