= 2014 Camellia Bowl =

2014 Raycom Media Camellia Bowl
- 1st Camellia Bowl
South Alabama Jaguars	Bowling Green Falcons
(6–6)	(7–6)
Sun Belt	MAC
28	33
Head coach: Joey Jones	Head coach: Dino Babers
	1	2	3	4	Total
South Alabama	7	0	7	14	28
Bowling Green	14	6	7	6	33
- Date: December 20, 2014
- Season: 2014
- Stadium: Cramton Bowl
- Location: Montgomery, Alabama
- MVP: Bowling Green QB James Knapke
- Favorite: South Alabama by 3.5
- Referee: Brandon Cruse (Mtn. West)
- Attendance: 20,256
- Payout: US$TBD

United States TV coverage
- Network: ESPN/ESPN Radio
- Announcers: Dave LaMont, Joey Galloway, & Paul Carcaterra (ESPN); Jason Benetti, Gene Chizik, & Niki Noto (ESPN Radio)

The 2014 Camellia Bowl was a post-season American college football bowl game that was played on December 20, 2014 at Cramton Bowl in Montgomery, Alabama. The first edition of the Camellia Bowl, it featured the Bowling Green Falcons of the Mid-American Conference against the South Alabama Jaguars of the Sun Belt Conference. The game began at 8:15 p.m. CST and aired on ESPN. It was one of the 2014–15 bowl games that concluded the 2014 FBS football season. The game was sponsored by the Raycom Media broadcasting company and was officially known as the Raycom Media Camellia Bowl.

The Jaguars accepted their invitation after finishing the regular season with a 6–6 record. The Falcons had a record of 7–6.

Bowling Green won the game by a score of 33–28.

== Team selection ==
The game featured the Bowling Green Falcons of the Mid-American Conference against the South Alabama Jaguars of the Sun Belt Conference.

This was the first meeting between these two teams.

=== Bowling Green Falcons ===
After the Falcons finished the season with a 7-6 record and won the MAC East Division title, they accepted their invite to the Camellia Bowl.

This was the Falcons' third bowl game in Alabama; they had previously won the 2004 GMAC Bowl over the Memphis Tigers by a score of 52–35, and later lost the 2008 GMAC Bowl to the Tulsa Golden Hurricane by a score of 63–7. Coincidentally, the GMAC Bowl (now known as the GoDaddy Bowl) was and is played in Mobile, where South Alabama's campus is located.

=== South Alabama Jaguars ===
After the Jaguars finished the regular season with a 6-6 record, bowl director Johnny Williams extended an invitation to play in the game.

This was the first time South Alabama has ever played in a bowl game, seven years after football was approved, five years after the program kicked off, and two years after they joined the Football Bowl Subdivision.

== Game summary ==
=== Scoring summary ===
Scoring summary

Quarter	Time	Drive			Team	Scoring information	Score	
Quarter	Time	Plays	Yards	TOP	Team	Scoring information	USA	BGSU
1	11:59	7	65	2:21	BGSU	Roger Lewis 44-yard touchdown reception from James Knapke, Tyler Tate kick good	0	7
1	7:17	9	93	2:57	BGSU	Travis Greene 1-yard touchdown run, Tyler Tate kick good	0	14
1	5:42	5	89	1:35	USA	Kendall Houston 44-yard touchdown run, Aleem Sunanon kick good	7	14
2	6:49	14	56	5:09	BGSU	39-yard field goal by Tyler Tate	7	17
2	0:53	8	36	1:41	BGSU	22-yard field goal by Tyler Tate	7	20
3	6:00	9	52	3:13	USA	Brandon Bridge 15-yard touchdown run, Aleem Sunanon kick good	14	20
3	4:33	5	47	1:27	BGSU	Travis Greene 17-yard touchdown run, Tyler Tate kick good	14	27
4	11:23	5	77	1:46	USA	DeMarrion Buford-Hughes 18-yard touchdown reception from Brandon Bridge, Aleem Sunanon kick good	21	27
4	1:20	8	73	2:53	USA	Terrance Timmons 3-yard touchdown run, Aleem Sunanon kick good	28	27
4	1:04	1	78	0:16	BGSU	Roger Lewis 78-yard touchdown reception from James Knapke, kick failed	28	33
"TOP" = time of possession. For other American football terms, see Glossary of American football.							28	33

=== Statistics ===
Statistics	USA	BGSU
First downs	23	24
Plays–yards	75–415	90–500
Rushes–yards	38–136	49–131
Passing yards	279	369
Passing Comp–Att–Int	20–37–2	26–41–0
Time of possession	25:35	34:25
