= Oneonta City School District =

School district in Alabama, United States

Address
- 28370 State Highway 75 Oneonta, Alabama, 35121; United States

District information
- Type: Public
- Grades: K–12
- NCES District ID: 0102550

Students and staff
- Students: 1,434
- Teachers: 87.02
- Staff: 24.96
- Student–teacher ratio: 16.48

Other information
- Website: www.oneontacityschools.com

Oneonta City School District is a school district in Blount County, Alabama.

The District includes:

- Oneonta Elementary School
- Oneonta Middle School
- Oneonta High School
