= Joey Jones (American football) =

American football player and coach (born 1962)

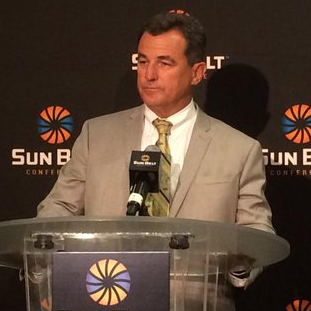

Current position
- Title: Wide receivers coach
- Team: Thompson HS (AL)

Biographical details
- Born: October 29, 1962 (age 64); Mobile, Alabama, U.S.

Playing career
- 1979–1983: Alabama
- 1983–1985: Birmingham Stallions
- 1986: Atlanta Falcons
- Position: Wide receiver

Coaching career (HC unless noted)
- 1989–1990: Briarwood Christian (AL) (assistant)
- 1991–1993: Dora HS (AL)
- 1996–2005: Mountain Brook HS (AL)
- 2006–2007: Birmingham–Southern
- 2008–2017: South Alabama
- 2018–2019: Mississippi State (ST)
- 2024–present: Thompson HS (AL) (WR)

Administrative career (AD unless noted)
- 2023: Mississippi State (DOPP)

Head coaching record
- Overall: 55–57 (college); 125–38 (high school)
- Bowls: 0–2

Accomplishments and honors

Awards
- Sun Belt Coach of the Year (2013); Second-team All-SEC (1983); Alabama All-Decade Team 1980s

Joseph Russell Jones (born October 29, 1962) is an American football coach and former player. He currently serves as the wide receivers coach at Thompson High School in Alabaster, Alabama. He served as the special teams coordinator at Mississippi State for two seasons, hired by head coach, Joe Moorehead from 2018 to 2019. Jones served as the head coach at the University of South Alabama from 2008 to 2017, the first coach in the program's history.

== Playing career ==
Jones is a graduate of Mobile's Murphy High School. He played college football for coach Bear Bryant at the University of Alabama. Jones lettered with the Tide from 1979 to 1983, graduating with a degree in business administration. As a wide receiver, he tallied 71 receptions, 1,386 yards and 15 touchdowns. He ranked third among Alabama's career touchdown receivers and seventh in career receiving yards. He was named All-SEC as a senior and chosen to participate in the Senior Bowl. He was a member of the University of Alabama's All-Decade Team for the 1980s and played professionally with the Birmingham Stallions of the United States Football League and the National Football League's Atlanta Falcons. He was drafted by the Falcons in the first round of the 1984 Supplemental Draft.

== Coaching career ==
In 1989, Jones took his first coaching job as an assistant coach on the Briarwood Christian School staff in Birmingham, Alabama. After two years at Briarwood, he took the job as head coach at Dora where he led his team to a 24–11 record over three seasons. In 1996, Jones was hired as the head coach at Mountain Brook High School. At Mountain Brook, he led his team to the 1996 Class 6A state championship game, four region titles, two semifinal appearances and three quarterfinal appearances. Jones went 101–27 over ten seasons in charge of the Spartans.

After compiling a .767 winning percentage as an Alabama high school coach, Jones was hired as the new head coach at Birmingham–Southern College, where he led the team to a 1–7 record in its first season in NCAA Division III football in 2007. Jones was the first coach of the Panthers since 1939, when the football program was disbanded.

After only one season at BSC, Jones accepted the same position at the University of South Alabama in February 2008. He was the first coach for the Jaguars and was in charge of creating the program. The team began play in 2009, and joined the NCAA Football Bowl Subdivision (Division I-A) in 2012 as members of the Sunbelt Conference.

Jones led South Alabama to a 23–4 record in his first three seasons at South Alabama as Division-I FCS independent. After initially struggling after moving to the Sun Belt Conference with a 2–11 record in 2012, the team has since improved and posted a winning record against in-conference competition. The 2014 season saw South Alabama selected to the 2014 Camellia Bowl, their first bowl game which they lost to Bowling Green 33–28.

On November 20, 2017, Jones announced he would resign from his position as head coach following the 2017 season.

On February 22, 2018, news broke that Jones had been hired as special teams coordinator at Mississippi State University.

On February 3, 2023, Jones along with fellow former South Alabama head coach, Steve Campbell, was hired by Zach Arnett to join back with Mississippi State with Jones joining as the director of player personnel.

On May 3, 2024, Jones returned back to the high school football sidelines and was hired to coach the inside wide receivers at Thompson High School in Alabaster, Alabama.

== Honors ==
In 2011, Jones was chosen to be inducted into the Mobile Sports Hall of Fame.

== Head coaching record ==
=== College ===
Year	Team	Overall	Conference	Standing	Bowl/playoffs
Birmingham–Southern Panthers (Southern Collegiate Athletic Conference) (2007)
2007	Birmingham–Southern	3–7	1–7		
Birmingham–Southern:		3–7	1–7		
South Alabama Jaguars (NCAA Division I FCS independent) (2009–2011)
2009	South Alabama	7–0			
2010	South Alabama	10–0			
2011	South Alabama	6–4			
South Alabama Jaguars (Sun Belt Conference) (2012–2017)
2012	South Alabama	2–11	1–7	10th	
2013	South Alabama	6–6	4–3	T–3rd	
2014	South Alabama	6–7	5–3	T–4th	L Camellia
2015	South Alabama	5–7	3–5	T–5th	
2016	South Alabama	6–7	2–6	T–8th	L Arizona
2017	South Alabama	4–8	3–5	T–8th	
South Alabama:		52–50	18–29		
Total:		55–57			
