= Riverdale High School (Georgia) =

Public high school in Riverdale, Georgia, United States

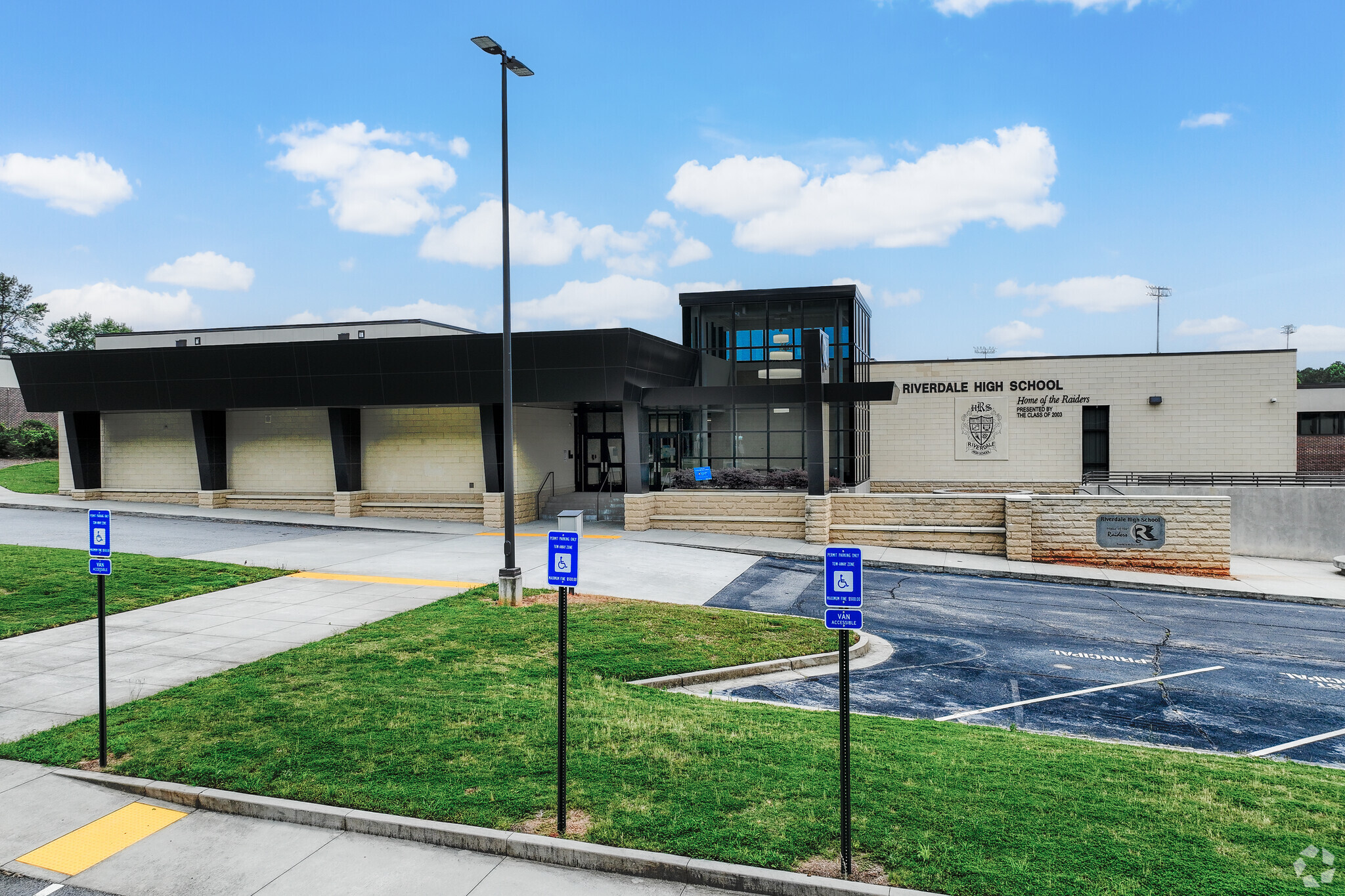

Location
- 160 Roberts Drive; Riverdale, Georgia 30274; United States; 33°33′24″N 84°24′07″W

Information
- Type: Public high school
- Motto: "In all things you do, do them with dignity, character and class" and "Teamwork makes the dream work!"
- Established: 1977; 49 years ago
- School district: Clayton County Public Schools
- Principal: Sharon Wilson
- Teaching staff: 70.00 (on an FTE basis)
- Grades: 9–12
- Enrollment: 1,359 (2024-2025)
- Student to teacher ratio: 19.41
- Colors: Black, Grey, and White
- Mascot: Raider (Pirate)
- Team name: Riverdale Raiders
- Website: 005.clayton.k12.ga.us

Riverdale High School is a public high school on Roberts Drive in Riverdale, Georgia, United States. The school serves about 1,400 students in grades 9 to 12 in the Clayton County Public Schools district. Its current principal is Sharon Wilson.

The school first opened in 1977 with a few unfinished projects to complete the construction of the school. Students and staff began use of the facilities on November 7 of that year.

The school's mascot is a pirate, giving the name "Riverdale Raiders" or "Raider Nation" to students and faculty. A flag with an "R" supported by a pirate's sword is the school's logo. The school colors are primarily black, grey, and white.

R&B singer Ciara, who graduated from Riverdale High School in 2003, revisited to receive a key to the city of Riverdale on October 19, 2006.

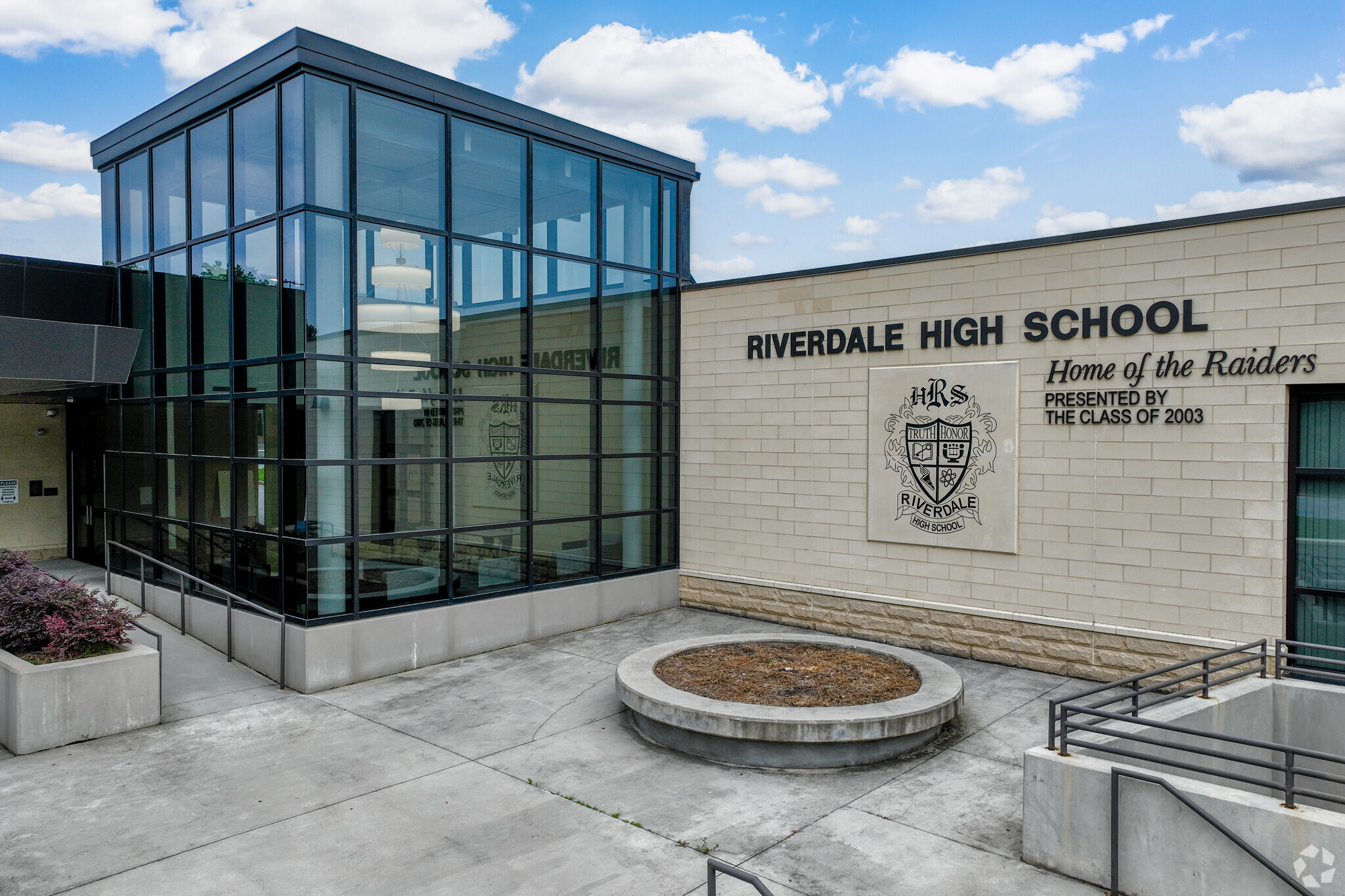
Riverdale High School, Home of the Raiders.

In 2015, Clayton County Schools approved unanimously to build a new state-of-the-art gymnasium for Riverdale High. It took less than 2 years to finish and by October 2017 it was completed costing around $13.3 million dollars. Riverdale High's new facility is the biggest competitive gymnasium in the county with a capacity of 2,300 persons. It will replace the old gymnasium building that was built in 1977. The former gym will act as an auxiliary gym, which will allow for more physical education class space and more space for various sports, clubs, and other organizations to take place.

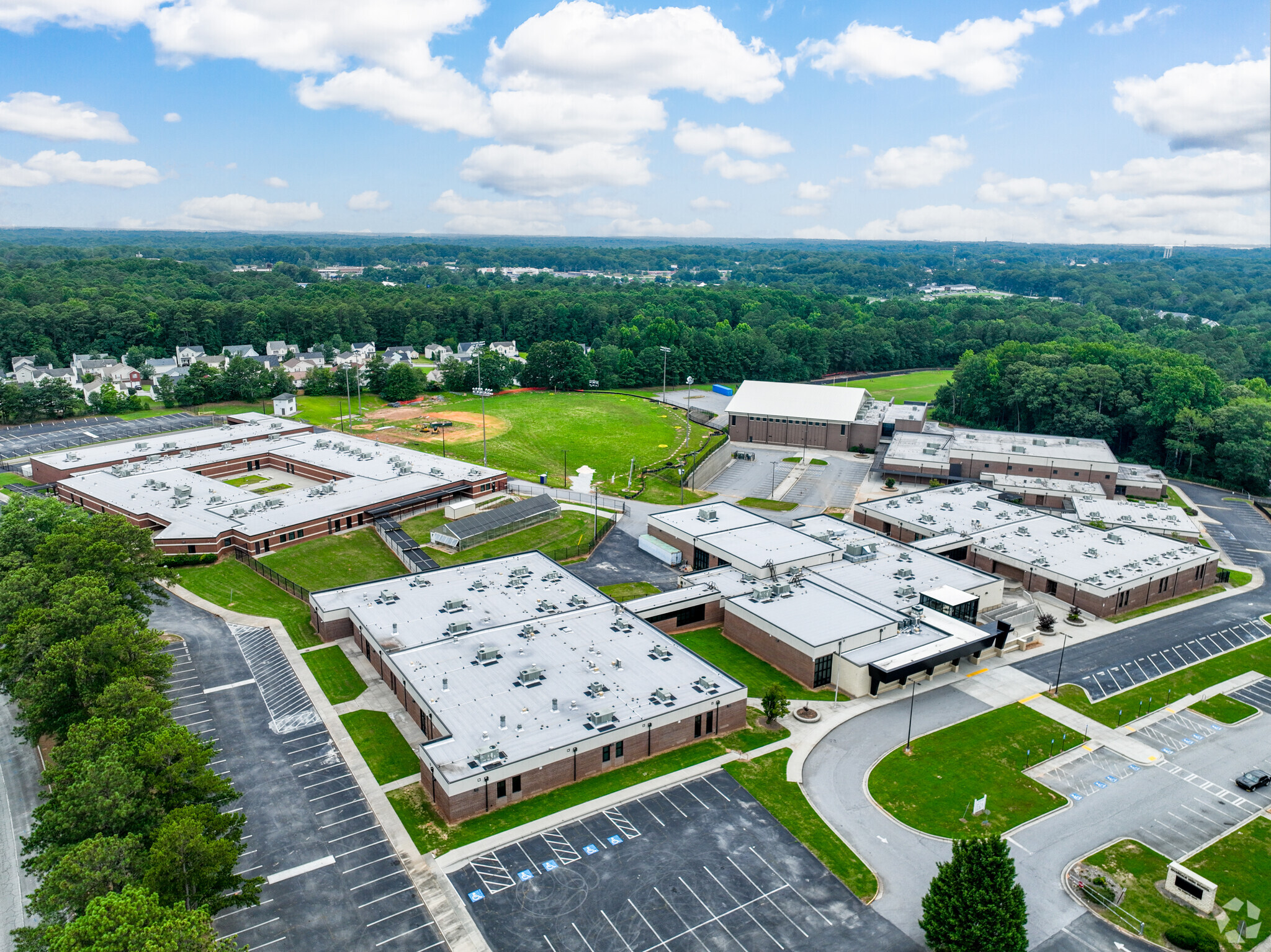
A drone aerial view of the school's campus from above, picture taken in 2022.

In the Summer of 2018, the bid to renovate Riverdale High was awarded in June 2018 and most renovation phases have been completed in early August 2019, a year ahead of schedule then projected before. The additional renovations will give the existing campus a whole new modern facade exterior, a new roof, and a greenhouse. Inside, restrooms, kitchens, media center, classrooms, science labs, and special education classrooms will get an overhaul. The HVAC and electrical systems as well as telephone, surveillance systems, data cabling, intercoms, and fire alarm system will be upgraded. This is the second project in as many years at Riverdale High since the opening of the school's new gymnasium back in October 2017.

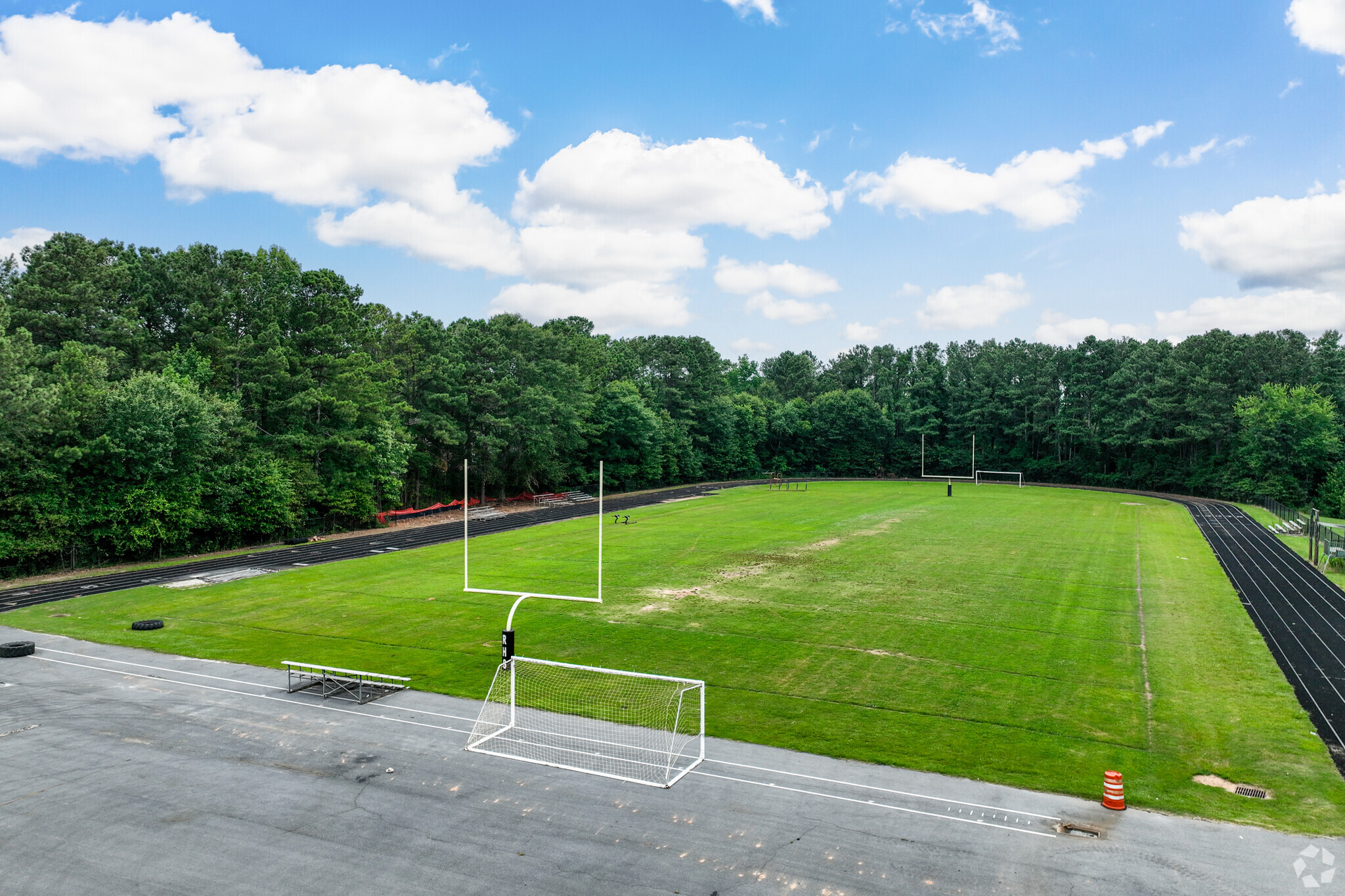
The football and track fields, picture taken in 2022.

In the March of 2023, the school's baseball/softball fields are being reconstructed with new dugouts. Along with that, there will be new concessions, press box buildings, fencing, more bleachers, new scoreboards, track resurfacing and irrigation, and new restrooms at athletic fields. The project was completed in March 2024.

== Notable alumni ==
- Bubba Thomas, NFL defensive tackle for the Seattle Seahawks
- Ciara, Singer, Songwriter
