= South Alabama Jaguars football =

American college football team

| 2026 South Alabama Jaguars football team |
- First season: 2009; 17 years ago
- Athletic director: Joel Erdman
- Head coach: Major Applewhite; 2nd season, 11–14 (.440)
- Location: Mobile, Alabama
- Stadium: Hancock Whitney Stadium (capacity: 25,450)
- NCAA division: Division I FBS
- Conference: Sun Belt
- Division: West
- Colors: Blue, white, and red
- All-time record: 94–106 (.470)
- Bowl record: 2–3 (.400)
- Rivalries: Troy (rivalry)
- Fight song: South!
- Mascot: SouthPaw and Mrs. Pawla
- Marching band: Jaguar Marching Band
- Website: USAJaguars.com

The South Alabama Jaguars football program, established in 2009, represents the University of South Alabama in the Football Bowl Subdivision (FBS) of the National Collegiate Athletic Association. South Alabama joined the FBS in 2012 as a member of the Sun Belt Conference (SBC).

== History ==
=== Joey Jones era (2009–2017) ===
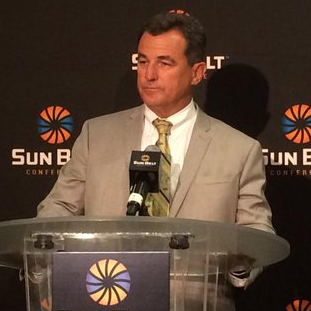
Coach Joey Jones

On December 6, 2007, the university's board of trustees approved the addition of football to the intercollegiate athletics program. The team began play in 2009 with a planned full transition to the NCAA Football Bowl Subdivision (Division I-A) by 2013. On February 15, 2008, President Gordon Moulton and Athletic Director Joe Gottfried announced Joey Jones, Birmingham–Southern head coach, as the first head football coach in the university's history. The team would play its home games at Ladd–Peebles Stadium, which it would call home until the 2020 opening of Hancock Whitney Stadium.

On September 5, 2009, the University of South Alabama Jaguars defeated Hargrave Military Academy 30–13 in the program's first ever game in front of more than 26,000 fans. The team completed its first season undefeated at 7–0, outscoring its opponents by a combined score of 321–41.

After playing a seven-game schedule in 2009, the Jaguars played 10 games in 2010. The 2010 schedule was made up of schools from NCAA Division I-FCS, NCAA Division II, the National Association of Intercollegiate Athletics, and no Junior Colleges. The team completed its second season undefeated at 10–0, outscoring its opponents by a combined score of 413–130.

The 2011 season marked the beginning of South Alabama's two-year transition phase from unclassified to Division I FBS status. South played as a Division I-FCS independent for the 2011 season. The Jaguars were scheduled to play 11 games in 2011 but after ending its contracts with UC Davis and Edward Waters College early, and only replacing them with a game against Mississippi Valley State, South played 10 games in the 2011 season. The 2011 schedule was made up of schools from NCAA Division I-FBS, NCAA Division I-FCS, and NCAA Division II. For the first time, South Alabama had games televised. The 2011 season opener against West Alabama was televised on local channel WJTC, as well as on ESPN3. The Jaguars' game against North Carolina State on September 17 was aired on ESPN3. The Jaguars finished the season 6–4.

The 2012 season was South Alabama's final year in the transition phase to full Division I-FBS status. The Jaguars began to face Sun Belt Conference teams in a full conference schedule, but were not eligible for either the conference title or post-season bowl games. The Jaguars did not perform well in their non-conference play, going 1–4, with the only victory over FCS opponent Nicholls State. The Jaguars also struggled in Sun Belt Conference play, going 1–7, with their only victory over Florida Atlantic. The team finished 2–11, and in last place in the Sun Belt.

The South Alabama Jaguars gained full Division I FBS status for the 2013–14 season in the Sun Belt Conference. The Jaguars also became eligible to win the Sun Belt Championship and for a post season Bowl game. The team finished the year at .500 with a 6–6 record, going 4–2 in home games. The Jaguars also went 4–3 in Sun Belt Conference play.

The South Alabama Jaguars finished the 2014 season with a record of 6–6, making them bowl eligible for the second straight year. On December 3, President Tony Waldrop, on behalf of the university and the football team, accepted an invitation to play in the inaugural Raycom Media Camellia Bowl. This was the first bowl game in South Alabama football history. As a result, in their 5th year of competition, and their 2nd of bowl eligibility, South Alabama broke Florida Atlantic's record and became the youngest FBS team to make a bowl game. In the first Camellia Bowl pit the Jaguars and Bowling Green. South Alabama lost their first bowl game 33–28.

The 2015 South Alabama Jaguars football team was led by seventh-year head coach Joey Jones and played their home games at Ladd–Peebles Stadium in Mobile, Alabama. The Jaguars were members of the Sun Belt Conference. They finished the season 5–7, 3–5 in Sun Belt play to finish in a five-way tie for fifth place.

In 2016, South Alabama recorded its first victory over an SEC opponent when it defeated Mississippi State by a score of 21–20 the opening weekend of the season. The victory was also USA's first over a Power 5 opponent. South Alabama stunned No. 19 San Diego State 42–24 for their first win over a ranked opponent. The Jaguars would go on to finish the season with a 6–7 record, losing to Air Force in the Arizona Bowl.

It was announced on November 20, 2017, Joey Jones would step down as coach at the end of the 2017 season.

=== Steve Campbell era (2018–2020) ===
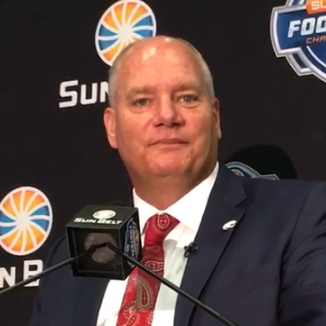
Coach Steve Campbell

On December 7, 2017, Steve Campbell, formerly head coach of Central Arkansas, would be the new coach for South Alabama football in 2018. Campbell coached for 3 seasons at South Alabama and went 3–9, 2–10, and 4–7 in those seasons. He was fired by the university at the end of the 2020 season after a 29–0 loss to rival Troy and finished with a 9–26 record in his time with the Jaguars.

=== Kane Wommack era (2021–2023) ===
On December 12, 2020, Kane Wommack, the defensive coordinator at Indiana and former defensive coordinator at South Alabama, was named the head coach of the Jaguars football program. In his first season with the Jaguars, Wommack went 5–7 overall and 2–6 in conference play. In his second season as the head coach, Wommack led the team to a 10–3 record (7-1 in conference play) and their first bowl game since the Joey Jones era. In his third season as the head coach, Wommack led the team to a 7–6 record (4–4 in conference play) and their first bowl game win in program history. He was hired by Alabama as their defensive coordinator on January 15, 2024.

=== Major Applewhite era (2024–present) ===
On January 18, 2024, Major Applewhite, former head coach of Houston and offensive coordinator at South Alabama, was named as the new head coach for the Jaguars. During Major Applewhite's first season as head coach, he led the Jaguars to a 7-6 record (5-3 in conference play) and their 2nd bowl win in team history. The Jaguars secured a 30-23 victory in the Salute to Veterans Bowl against Western Michigan. In his second year as head coach, the Jaguars finished with a 4-8 record (3-5 in conference play), their first losing record since 2021.

== Conference affiliations ==
- NCAA unclassified (2009–2010)
- NCAA Division I FCS Independent (transitioning to FBS) (2011)
- Sun Belt Conference (2012–present)

== Bowl games ==
South Alabama has participated in five bowl games. The Jaguars have a bowl record of 2–3.

| Date | Coach | Bowl | Opponent | Result |
|---|---|---|---|---|
| December 20, 2014 | Joey Jones | Camellia Bowl | Bowling Green | L 28–33 |
| December 30, 2016 | Joey Jones | Arizona Bowl | Air Force | L 21–45 |
| December 21, 2022 | Kane Wommack | New Orleans Bowl | Western Kentucky | L 23–44 |
| December 23, 2023 | Kane Wommack | 68 Ventures Bowl | Eastern Michigan | W 59–10 |
| December 14, 2024 | Major Applewhite | Salute to Veterans Bowl | Western Michigan | W 30–23 |

== Rivalries ==
=== Troy ===
South Alabama and Troy are in-state and Sun Belt Conference rivals. The two schools first met in 2012. Troy lead the series at 10–5 through the 2026 season.

== Facilities ==
=== Ladd–Peebles Stadium ===
Ladd–Peebles Stadium has been home to the South Alabama Jaguars football program since it was established in 2009. Opened in 1948, the first event held inside the stadium was a college football game between the Alabama Crimson Tide and the Vanderbilt Commodores on October 2, 1948. The stadium also lives in Alabama Crimson Tide football folklore as the site of head coach Bear Bryant's first game in charge of the Crimson Tide. Ladd–Peebles has hosted various other events, from concerts and boxing matches to festivals, and has a present full-capacity of 40,000 (per Ladd Peebles stadium) seats.

=== Hancock Whitney Stadium ===
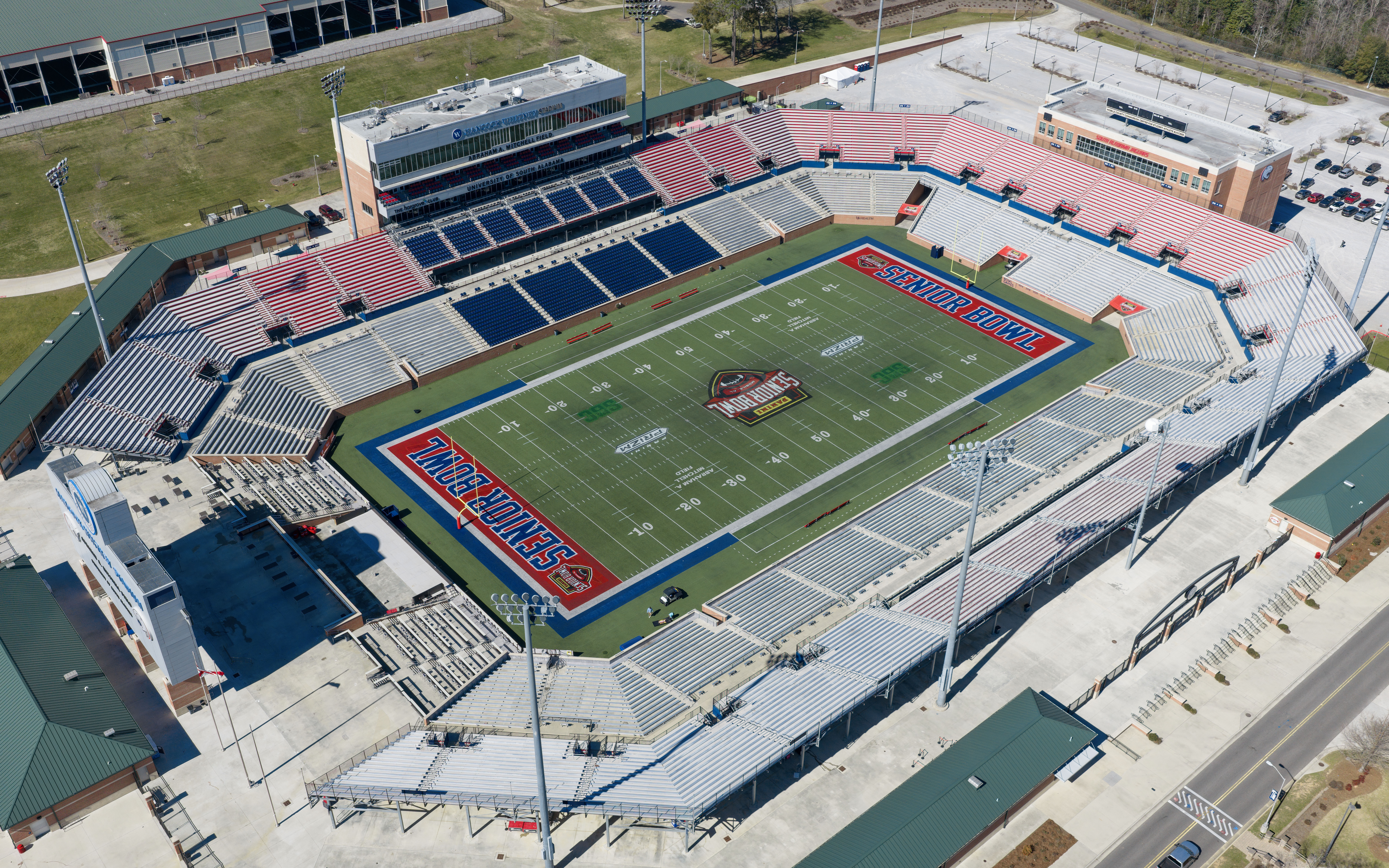
Hancock Whitney Stadium

South Alabama opened their new 25,450-seat on-campus stadium, Hancock Whitney Stadium, on September 12, 2020, as the South Alabama Jaguars hosted the Tulane Green Wave.

=== The South Alabama Football Fieldhouse ===
The South Alabama Football Fieldhouse covers 49,000 square feet of space, which includes an 8,000-square-foot weight room. It was designed to be functional and to have a "wow" factor for recruiting. In addition to the weight room the fieldhouse contains a main foyer, coaches' offices, locker room, equipment room, administrative offices, training room complete with hot and cold tubs and other medicinal needs, team meeting room, individual position meeting rooms and a players lounge.

=== The Jaguar Training Center ===
The South Alabama Jaguar Training Center (JTC) was opened on August 3, 2018, and is the largest covered practice facility in the state of Alabama. It was a multimillion-dollar project put on by the university. The 65-foot tall facility includes a full size regulation football field along with a 15-yard practice area and regulation field goal posts at each end. While under construction, the JTC collapsed due to "inadequate bracing" in July 2017 and construction was put on hold until January 2018 when it was continued.

== Traditions ==
=== #5 ===
In a tradition that started in South Alabama's second season, following the death of running back Anthony Mostella, Coach Joey Jones selects a senior that "earned it" would be given Mostella's number 5 jersey for the season. A fan favorite, Mostella was known for his leadership and hard work ethic. Coach Joey Jones wanted to pay respect to Mostella by giving his #5 jersey to a senior each season that displayed the leadership skills and work ethic that Mostella portrayed. This tradition was discontinued from 2018-2020 under Steve Campbell, but Kane Wommack brought the tradition back in 2021 with a slight change. Instead of one player being awarded the number 5 jersey for the whole year, a different player is selected to wear it each game.

=== Homecoming ===
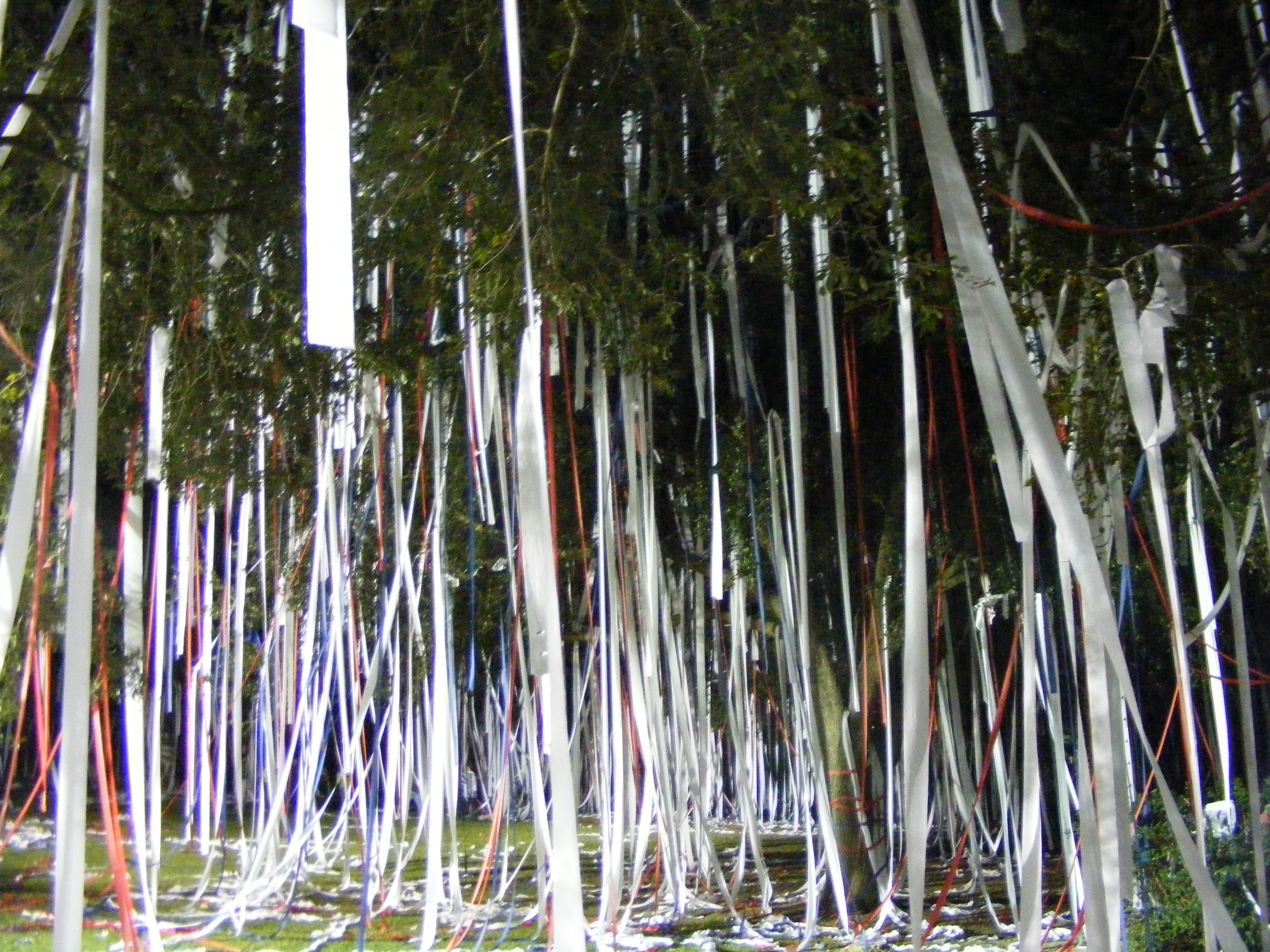
"Junk the Jungle" Homecoming Event

With the establishment of the football team, Homecoming was officially moved to the fall where it had previously supported the school's varsity basketball team.

An attempt by the students of the university to entice a grassroots movement for support of NCAA football in 2006 led to multiple acts of temporary and non destructive vandalism across the campus organized in a single night dubbed by the organizing students as "viva la resistance". Since the Jaguar football team was established homecoming has featured an event called "junk the jungle", in which toilet paper and streamers are used to cover all the trees in the school's central traffic circle. It can only be assumed that this is done in remembrance of those student pranksters as this is identical to one of the acts they committed. Other acts committed that night included sidewalk chalk and window painting of various campus buildings and walkways featuring messages such as "NCAA football", "We Want Football", and drawing images of footballs. The school's track field was also spray painted with the letters "NCAA", in large characters. The individual pranks were conducted by small teams where the final act of "junking the jungle", included all the students invited to participate.

== Future non-conference opponents ==
Announced schedules as of November 20, 2026.

| 2027 | 2028 | 2029 | 2030 | 2031 |
|---|---|---|---|---|
| at Florida | Alabama State | Ole Miss | UAB | at UAB |
| West Georgia | at Ole Miss | | | Jacksonville State |
| Middle Tennessee | Bowling Green | | | |
| at Jacksonville State | at Middle Tennessee | | | |
