= 2000–01 Pacific-10 Conference men's basketball season =

2000–01 Pac-10 Men's Basketball Season
- League: NCAA Division I
- Sport: Basketball
- Teams: 10

Regular Season
- Champion: Stanford
- Runners-up: Arizona
- Season MVP: Sean Lampley, California

Basketball seasons
- 99–00 01–02

2000–01 Pacific-10 Conference men's basketball standings
	Conf.				Overall
Team	W		L	PCT	W		L	PCT
No. 5 Stanford	16	–	2	.889	31	–	3	.912
No. 2 Arizona	15	–	3	.833	28	–	8	.778
No. 12 UCLA	14	–	4	.778	23	–	9	.719
No. 14 USC	11	–	7	.611	24	–	10	.706
California	11	–	7	.611	20	–	11	.645
Oregon	5	–	13	.278	14	–	14	.500
Arizona State	5	–	13	.278	13	–	16	.448
Washington State	5	–	13	.278	12	–	16	.429
Oregon State	4	–	14	.222	10	–	20	.333
Washington	4	–	14	.222	10	–	20	.333
As of November 30, 2007; Rankings from Coaches Poll

The 2000–01 Pacific-10 Conference men's basketball season ended with five teams participating in the 2001 NCAA Division I men's basketball tournament.

The Stanford Cardinal won the regular season championship.

Only three teams, Stanford (#2), Arizona (#4), and UCLA (#18), finished the season in the Coaches Poll. They were #2, #5, and #15 respectively in the "AP Top 25" poll. However, in the final post-NCAA tournament coaches' poll, USC was also ranked, coming in at #14, behind Arizona (#2), Stanford (#5) and UCLA (#12).

== Postseason ==
Five Pac-10 teams participated in the 2001 NCAA Men's Division I Basketball Tournament. Four teams (Stanford, Arizona, UCLA, USC) all advanced to the Sweet 16, with Stanford making it to the Elite 8. Arizona made it all the way to the national championship game, losing to Duke, 82-72

== Awards and honors ==
=== Player/Coach of the Year ===
- Player of The Year: Sean Lampley, California
- Freshman of The Year: Luke Ridnour, Oregon
- Coach of The Year: Steve Lavin, UCLA

=== All-Pac-10 Team ===
Name	School	Position	Year
Gilbert Arenas	Arizona	Guard	Sophomore
Bryan Bracey	Oregon	Forward	Senior
Sam Clancy	USC	Forward	Junior
Jarron Collins	Stanford	Forward	Senior
Jason Collins	Stanford	Center	Junior
Casey Jacobsen	Stanford	Guard/Forward	Sophomore
Jason Kapono	UCLA	Forward	Sophomore
Sean Lampley	California	Forward	Senior
Earl Watson	UCLA	Guard	Senior
Michael Wright	Arizona	Forward	Junior
