= 2001 NCAA Men's Basketball All-Americans =

- Awarded for: 2000–01 NCAA Division I men's basketball season

The Consensus 2001 College Basketball All-American team, as determined by aggregating the results of four major All-American teams. To earn "consensus" status, a player must win honors from a majority of the following teams: the Associated Press, the USBWA, The Sporting News and the National Association of Basketball Coaches.

== 2001 Consensus All-America team ==
Consensus First Team
Player	Position	Class	Team
Shane Battier	F	Senior	Duke
Joseph Forte	G	Sophomore	North Carolina
Casey Jacobsen	G-F	Sophomore	Stanford
Troy Murphy	F	Junior	Notre Dame
Jason Williams	G	Sophomore	Duke

Consensus Second Team
Player	Position	Class	Team
Troy Bell	G	Sophomore	Boston College
Michael Bradley	C	Junior	Villanova
Tayshaun Prince	F	Junior	Kentucky
Jason Richardson	G-F	Sophomore	Michigan State
Jamaal Tinsley	G	Senior	Iowa State

== Individual All-America teams ==
All-America Team
All-America Team	First team		Second team		Third team	
All-America Team	Player	School	Player	School	Player	School
Associated Press	Shane Battier	Duke	Troy Bell	Boston College	Charlie Bell	Michigan State
Associated Press	Joseph Forte	North Carolina	Michael Bradley	Villanova	Udonis Haslem	Florida
Associated Press	Casey Jacobsen	Stanford	Tayshaun Prince	Kentucky	Kirk Haston	Indiana
Associated Press	Troy Murphy	Notre Dame	Jason Richardson	Michigan State	Frank Williams	Illinois
Associated Press	Jason Williams	Duke	Jamaal Tinsley	Iowa State	Michael Wright	Arizona
USBWA	Shane Battier	Duke	Troy Bell	Boston College	No third team	
USBWA	Joseph Forte	North Carolina	Michael Bradley	Villanova	No third team	
USBWA	Casey Jacobsen	Stanford	Tayshaun Prince	Kentucky	No third team	
USBWA	Troy Murphy	Notre Dame	Jason Richardson	Michigan State	No third team	
USBWA	Jason Williams	Duke	Jamaal Tinsley	Iowa State	No third team	
NABC	Shane Battier	Duke	Charlie Bell	Michigan State	Jason Collins	Stanford
NABC	Joseph Forte	North Carolina	Troy Bell	Boston College	Juan Dixon	Maryland
NABC	Troy Murphy	Notre Dame	Michael Bradley	Villanova	Brendan Haywood	North Carolina
NABC	Jamaal Tinsley	Iowa State	Casey Jacobsen	Stanford	Tayshaun Prince	Kentucky
NABC	Jason Williams	Duke	Frank Williams	Illinois	Jason Richardson	Michigan State
Sporting News	Shane Battier	Duke	Troy Bell	Boston College	No third team	
Sporting News	Joseph Forte	North Carolina	Michael Bradley	Villanova	No third team	
Sporting News	Casey Jacobsen	Stanford	Brendan Haywood	North Carolina	No third team	
Sporting News	Troy Murphy	Notre Dame	Jason Richardson	Michigan State	No third team	
Sporting News	Jason Williams	Duke	Jamaal Tinsley	Iowa State	No third team	

AP Honorable Mention:

- Gilbert Arenas, Arizona
- Craig Austin, Columbia
- Cory Bradford, Illinois
- Tarise Bryson, Illinois State
- Torrey Butler, Coastal Carolina
- Casey Calvary, Gonzaga
- Jarron Collins, Stanford
- Jason Collins, Stanford
- Juan Dixon, Maryland
- Teddy Dupay, Florida
- Melvin Ely, Fresno State
- George Evans, George Mason
- Reggie Evans, Iowa
- Jason Gardner, Arizona
- Jerry Green, UC Irvine
- Kenny Gregory, Kansas
- Eddie Griffin, Seton Hall
- Trenton Hassell, Austin Peay
- Brendan Haywood, North Carolina
- Brian Heinle, Cal State Northridge
- Dewayne Jefferson, Mississippi Valley State
- Joe Johnson, Arkansas
- Ken Johnson, Ohio State
- Rahsaan Johnson, Monmouth
- Jason Kapono, UCLA
- Sean Lampley, California
- Steve Logan, Cincinnati
- Shernard Long, Georgia State
- Jody Lumpkin, College of Charleston
- Demond Mallet, McNeese State
- Chris Marcus, Western Kentucky
- Ronnie McCollum, Centenary
- Jeff Monaco, Southern Utah
- Terence Morris, Maryland
- Brett Nelson, Florida
- Rashad Phillips, Detroit
- Norman Richardson, Hofstra
- Kareem Rush, Missouri
- Preston Shumpert, Syracuse
- Demond Stewart, Niagara
- Tim Szatko, Holy Cross
- David Webber, Central Michigan
- Mekeli Wesley, Brigham Young
- David West, Xavier
- Rodney White, Charlotte
- Tarvis Williams, Hampton
- Loren Woods, Arizona
