= 2000–01 Stanford Cardinal men's basketball team =

American college basketball season

2000–01 Stanford Cardinal men's basketball

Pacific-10 Regular Season champions Puerto Rico Shootout champions

NCAA tournament, Elite Eight
- Conference: Pacific-10 Conference

Ranking
- Coaches: No. 5
- AP: No. 2
- Record: 31–3 (16–2 Pac-10)
- Head coach: Mike Montgomery (15th season)
- Assistant coaches: Tony Fuller; Eric Reveno; Russell Turner
- Home arena: Maples Pavilion (Capacity: 7,392)

2000–01 Pacific-10 Conference men's basketball standings
	Conf.				Overall
Team	W		L	PCT	W		L	PCT
No. 5 Stanford	16	–	2	.889	31	–	3	.912
No. 2 Arizona	15	–	3	.833	28	–	8	.778
No. 12 UCLA	14	–	4	.778	23	–	9	.719
No. 14 USC	11	–	7	.611	24	–	10	.706
California	11	–	7	.611	20	–	11	.645
Oregon	5	–	13	.278	14	–	14	.500
Arizona State	5	–	13	.278	13	–	16	.448
Washington State	5	–	13	.278	12	–	16	.429
Oregon State	4	–	14	.222	10	–	20	.333
Washington	4	–	14	.222	10	–	20	.333
As of November 30, 2007; Rankings from Coaches Poll

The 2000–01 Stanford Cardinal men's basketball team represented Stanford University in the 2000–01 NCAA Division I men's basketball season. Beginning the season 20–0, the team finished 1st in the Pacific-10 Conference with a 16–2 conference record, 31–3 overall. The Cardinal competed in the 2001 NCAA Division I men's basketball tournament, losing to Maryland 87–73 in the Elite Eight.

== Roster ==
2000–01 Stanford Cardinal men's basketball team
Players
Coaches

Pos.	#	Name	Height	Weight	Year	Previous school	Hometown
C	11	Curtis Borchardt	7 ft 0 in (2.13 m)	230 lb (104 kg)	So	Eastlake	Redmond, Washington
G/F	23	Casey Jacobsen	6 ft 6 in (1.98 m)	210 lb (95 kg)	So	Glendora	Glendora, California
G	24	Julius Barnes	6 ft 1 in (1.85 m)	180 lb (82 kg)	So		Rowland Heights, California
C	31	Jarron Collins	6 ft 11 in (2.11 m)	240 lb (109 kg)	Sr	Harvard-Westlake	Los Angeles, California
C	34	Jason Collins	7 ft 0 in (2.13 m)	245 lb (111 kg)	Sr	Harvard-Westlake	Los Angeles, California

Head coach

- Mike Montgomery (Long Beach State)

Assistant coach(es)

Legend

- (C) Team captain
- (S) Suspended
- (I) Ineligible
- (W) Walk-on
- Injured
- Current redshirt

Roster

== Schedule ==
Date time, TV	Rank^{#}	Opponent^{#}	Result	Record	Site (attendance) city, state
Exhibition
November 8, 2000*; 7:30 pm	No. 4	EA Sports All-Stars	W 91–70	–	Maples Pavilion; Stanford, CA
November 14, 2000*; 7:30 pm	No. 5	Global Sports	W 107–74	–	Maples Pavilion; Stanford, CA
Regular season
November 19, 2000*; 5:00 pm	No. 5	San Francisco State	W 100–49	1–0	Maples Pavilion; Stanford, CA
November 23, 2000*; 12:00 pm	No. 5	vs. Old Dominion; Puerto Rico Shootout	W 84–60	2–0	Coliseo Rubén Rodríguez; Bayamón, Puerto Rico
November 24, 2000*; 11:00 am	No. 5	vs. Memphis; Puerto Rico Shootout	W 83–60	3–0	Coliseo Rubén Rodríguez; Bayamón, Puerto Rico
November 25, 2000*; 12:00 pm	No. 5	vs. Georgia; Puerto Rico Shootout	W 71–58	4–0	Coliseo Rubén Rodríguez; Bayamón, Puerto Rico
November 29, 2000*; 7:30 pm	No. 4	UC Riverside	W 84–41	5–0	Maples Pavilion; Stanford, CA
December 2, 2000*; 7:30 pm	No. 4	at Long Beach State	W 86–63	6–0	Walter Pyramid; Long Beach, CA
December 18, 2000*; 6:30 pm	No. 3	Sacred Heart; Stanford Invitational	W 94–52	7–0	Maples Pavilion; Stanford, CA
December 19, 2000*; 8:30 pm	No. 3	Georgia Tech; Stanford Invitational	W 80–66	8–0	Maples Pavilion; Stanford, CA
December 21, 2000*; 6:00 pm, FSN	No. 3	vs. No. 1 Duke; Pete Newell Challenge	W 84–83	9–0	The Arena in Oakland (19,804); Oakland, CA
December 29, 2000*; 8:00 pm	No. 2	vs. Fordham; Cable Car Classic	W 86–60	10–0	Leavey Center; Santa Clara, CA
December 30, 2000*; 8:00 pm	No. 2	vs. Santa Clara; Cable Car Classic	W 78–63	11–0	Leavey Center; Santa Clara, CA
January 4, 2001; 6:30 pm	No. 2	at Arizona State	W 94–77	12–0 (1–0)	Wells Fargo Arena; Tempe, AZ
January 8, 2001; CBS	No. 2	No. 16 Arizona	W 85–76	13–0 (2–0)	McKale Center; Tucson, AZ
January 11, 2001; 7:30 pm	No. 1	Oregon State	W 73–49	14–0 (3–0)	Maples Pavilion; Stanford, CA
January 13, 2001; 3:00 pm	No. 1	Oregon	W 100–76	15–0 (4–0)	Maples Pavilion; Stanford, CA
January 18, 2001; 7:30 pm	No. 1	California	W 84–58	16–0 (5–0)	Maples Pavilion; Stanford, CA
January 20, 2001*; 5:00 pm	No. 1	New Mexico	W 75–44	17–0	Maples Pavilion; Stanford, CA
January 25, 2001; 7:30 pm	No. 1	at Washington	W 94–63	18–0 (6–0)	Bank of America Arena; Seattle, WA
January 27, 2001; 7:30 pm	No. 1	at Washington State	W 72–61	19–0 (7–0)	Beasley Coliseum; Pullman, WA
February 1, 2001; 7:30 pm	No. 1	No. 21 USC	W 77–71	20–0 (8–0)	Maples Pavilion; Stanford, CA
February 3, 2001; 12:00 pm, ABC	No. 1	UCLA	L 73–79	20–1 (8–1)	Maples Pavilion (7,391); Stanford, CA
February 8, 2001; 7:30 pm	No. 2	at Oregon	W 69–62	21–1 (9–1)	McArthur Court; Eugene, OR
February 10, 2001; 7:05 pm	No. 2	at Oregon State	W 82–63	22–1 (10–1)	Gill Coliseum; Corvallis, OR
February 17, 2001; 3:00 pm	No. 2	at California	W 88–56	23–1 (11–1)	Haas Pavilion; Berkeley, CA
February 22, 2001; 7:30 pm	No. 1	Washington State	W 75–64	24–1 (12–1)	Maples Pavilion; Stanford, CA
February 24, 2001; 5:00 pm	No. 1	Washington	W 99–79	25–1 (13–1)	Maples Pavilion; Stanford, CA
March 1, 2001; 7:30 pm	No. 1	at USC	W 70–68	26–1 (14–1)	Los Angeles Memorial Sports Arena; Los Angeles, CA
March 3, 2001; 1:00 pm, CBS	No. 1	at No. 12 UCLA	W 85–79	27–1 (15–1)	Pauley Pavilion; Los Angeles, CA
March 8, 2001; 7:30 pm	No. 1	No. 8 Arizona	L 75–76	27–2 (15–2)	Maples Pavilion; Stanford, CA
March 10, 2001; 1:00 pm	No. 1	Arizona State	W 99–75	28–2 (16–2)	Maples Pavilion; Stanford, CA
NCAA tournament
March 15, 2001*; 2:18 pm, CBS	(1 W) No. 2	(16 W) UNC Greensboro; First round	W 89–60	29–2	Cox Arena; San Diego, CA
March 17, 2001*; 5:08 pm, CBS	(1 W) No. 2	(9 W) Saint Joseph's; Second round	W 90–83	30–2	Cox Arena; San Diego, CA
March 22, 2001*; 7:00 pm, CBS	(1 W) No. 2	(5 W) Cincinnati; Sweet Sixteen	W 78–65	31–2	Arrowhead Pond of Anaheim (18,008); Anaheim, CA
March 24, 2001*; 1:40 pm, CBS	(1 W) No. 2	(3 W) No. 11 Maryland; Elite Eight	L 73–87	31–3	Arrowhead Pond of Anaheim (18,008); Anaheim, CA
*Non-conference game. ^{#}Rankings from AP Poll. (#) Tournament seedings in parentheses. All times are in Pacific Time. (#) during NCAA is seed within region. W = West Region.

Schedule Source:

== Rankings ==
Ranking movements Legend: ██ Increase in ranking ██ Decrease in ranking
	Week																			
Poll	Pre	1	2	3	4	5	6	7	8	9	10	11	12	13	14	15	16	17	18	Final
AP	4	5	5	4	4	3	3	2	2	1	1	1	1	2	2	1	1	1	2	Not released
Coaches	3	3^	5	3	3	3	3	2	2	1	1	1	1	2	2	1	1	1	2	5

*AP does not release post-NCAA Tournament rankings
^Coaches did not release a week 2 poll

== 2001 NBA draft ==
Round	Pick	Player	NBA Team
1	18	Jason Collins	Houston Rockets
2	53	Jarron Collins	Utah Jazz
