= 2000–01 Arizona Wildcats men's basketball team =

American college basketball season

2000–01 Arizona Wildcats men's basketball

NCAA tournament, Runner-up Maui Invitational Champions

National Championship Game, L 72-82 vs. Duke
- Conference: Pacific-10 Conference

Ranking
- Coaches: No. 2
- AP: No. 5
- Record: 28–8 (15–3 Pac-10)
- Head coach: Lute Olson (18th season)
- Home arena: McKale Center

2000–01 Pacific-10 Conference men's basketball standings
	Conf.				Overall
Team	W		L	PCT	W		L	PCT
No. 5 Stanford	16	–	2	.889	31	–	3	.912
No. 2 Arizona	15	–	3	.833	28	–	8	.778
No. 12 UCLA	14	–	4	.778	23	–	9	.719
No. 14 USC	11	–	7	.611	24	–	10	.706
California	11	–	7	.611	20	–	11	.645
Oregon	5	–	13	.278	14	–	14	.500
Arizona State	5	–	13	.278	13	–	16	.448
Washington State	5	–	13	.278	12	–	16	.429
Oregon State	4	–	14	.222	10	–	20	.333
Washington	4	–	14	.222	10	–	20	.333
As of November 30, 2007; Rankings from Coaches Poll

The 2000–01 Arizona Wildcats men's basketball team represented the University of Arizona in the 2000–01 NCAA Division I men's basketball season. The head coach was Lute Olson. The team played its home games in the McKale Center in Tucson, Arizona, and was a member of the Pacific-10 Conference. The Wildcats finished the season second behind Stanford in the Pacific-10 conference with a 15–3 record. Arizona reached the National Championship game in the 2001 NCAA Division I men's basketball tournament, losing to Duke 82–72 and finishing the season with a 28–8 record.

== Roster ==
2000–01 Arizona Wildcats men's basketball team
Players
Coaches

Pos.	#	Name	Height	Weight	Year	Previous school	Hometown
G	0	Gilbert Arenas	6 ft 3 in (1.91 m)	188 lb (85 kg)	So	Grant HS	North Hollywood, California
F	2	Michael Wright	6 ft 7 in (2.01 m)	238 lb (108 kg)	Jr	Farragut Academy	Chicago, Illinois
C	3	Loren Woods	7 ft 1 in (2.16 m)	244 lb (111 kg)	Sr	Wake Forest	St. Louis, Missouri
F	4	Luke Walton	6 ft 8 in (2.03 m)	233 lb (106 kg)	So	Univ. of San Diego HS	San Diego, California
G	5	Travis Hanour	6 ft 6 in (1.98 m)	189 lb (86 kg)	Fr	Laguna Beach HS	Laguna Beach, California
G	11	Jason Ranne	6 ft 4 in (1.93 m)	200 lb (91 kg)	Fr	Bishop Kelley HS	Tulsa, Oklahoma
F	13	Andrew Zahn	6 ft 9 in (2.06 m)	254 lb (115 kg)	Fr	Redondo Union HS	Redondo Beach, California
F	14	Mike Schwertley	6 ft 5 in (1.96 m)	224 lb (102 kg)	Fr	Brophy Prep	Phoenix, Arizona
G	15	John Ash	5 ft 11 in (1.8 m)	179 lb (81 kg)	Sr	Salpointe Catholic HS	Tucson, Arizona
G	22	Jason Gardner	5 ft 10 in (1.78 m)	181 lb (82 kg)	So	North Central HS	Indianapolis, Indiana
G	23	Lamont Frazier	6 ft 2 in (1.88 m)	182 lb (83 kg)	Sr	Lon Morris College	Los Angeles, California
G	24	Russell Harris	5 ft 11 in (1.8 m)	165 lb (75 kg)	So	Mundelein HS	Mundelein, Illinois
F	30	Justin Wessel	6 ft 8 in (2.03 m)	240 lb (109 kg)	Sr	Prairie HS	Cedar Rapids, Iowa
F	33	Eugene Edgerson	6 ft 6 in (1.98 m)	237 lb (108 kg)	Sr	St. Augustine HS	New Orleans, Louisiana
F	35	Rick Anderson	6 ft 9 in (2.06 m)	213 lb (97 kg)	Jr	Long Beach Poly HS	Long Beach, California
F	44	Richard Jefferson	6 ft 7 in (2.01 m)	222 lb (101 kg)	Jr	Moon Valley HS	Phoenix, Arizona

Head coach

- Lute Olson (Augsburg)

Assistant coach(es)

- Jim Rosborough (associate head coach) (Iowa)
- Rodney Tention (San Francisco)
- Jay John (Arizona)

Legend

- (C) Team captain
- (S) Suspended
- (I) Ineligible
- (W) Walk-on
- Injured
- Current redshirt

Roster

=== Depth chart ===
Pos.	Starting 5	Bench 1	Bench 2	Bench 3
C	Loren Woods	Justin Wessel	Andrew Zahn
PF	Michael Wright	Eugene Edgerson	Rick Anderson
SF	Richard Jefferson	Luke Walton	Mike Schwertley
SG	Gilbert Arenas	Travis Hanour	Jason Ranne
PG	Jason Gardner	Lamont Frazier	John Ash	Russell Harris

== Schedule and results ==
Date time, TV	Rank^{#}	Opponent^{#}	Result	Record	Site (attendance) city, state
Regular season
Nov. 20, 2000*	No. 1	vs. Chaminade; Maui Invitational quarterfinal	W 97–57	1–0	Lahaina Civic Center; Maui, HI
Nov. 21, 2000*	No. 1	vs. Dayton; Maui Invitational semifinal	W 76–59	2–0	Lahaina Civic Center; Maui, HI
Nov. 22, 2000*	No. 1	vs. No. 8 Illinois; Maui Invitational championship	W 79–76	3–0	Lahaina Civic Center; Maui, HI
Nov. 25, 2000*	No. 1	vs. Purdue; John Wooden Tradition	L 69–72	3–1	Conseco Fieldhouse; Indianapolis, Indiana
Nov. 29, 2000*	No. 5	Gonzaga	W 101–87	4–1	McKale Center; Tucson, Arizona
Dec. 2, 2000*	No. 5	Saint Mary's	W 101–41	5–1	McKale Center; Tucson, Arizona
Dec. 9, 2000*; CBS	No. 5	at No. 15 Connecticut	L 69–71	5–2	Harry A. Gampel Pavilion; Storrs, Connecticut
Dec. 16, 2000*	No. 7	vs. No. 5 Illinois	L 73–81	5–3	United Center; Chicago, Illinois
Dec. 20, 2000*	No. 10	LSU	W 88–75	6–3	McKale Center; Tucson, Arizona
Dec. 28, 2000*	No. 12	Butler	W 72–60	7–3	McKale Center; Tucson, Arizona
Dec. 30, 2000*	No. 12	Mississippi State	L 74–75	7–4	McKale Center; Tucson, Arizona
Jan. 4, 2001	No. 16	California	W 78–75	8–4 (1–0)	McKale Center; Tucson, Arizona
Jan. 6, 2001; CBS	No. 16	No. 2 Stanford	L 76–85	8–5 (1–1)	McKale Center; Tucson, Arizona
Jan. 11, 2001	No. 21	at Washington State	W 84–51	9–5 (2–1)	Beasley Coliseum; Pullman, Washington
Jan. 13, 2001	No. 21	at Washington	W 89–64	10–5 (3–1)	Bank of America Arena; Seattle
Jan. 18, 2001	No. 17	No. 24 USC	W 71–58	11–5 (4–1)	McKale Center; Tucson, Arizona
Jan. 20, 2001; CBS	No. 17	UCLA; Rivalry	W 88–63	12–5 (5–1)	McKale Center; Tucson, Arizona
Jan. 24, 2001	No. 12	Arizona State; Rivalry	W 86–75	13–5 (6–1)	McKale Center; Tucson, Arizona
Jan. 27, 2001*; ABC	No. 12	No. 20 Texas	W 80–52	14–5	McKale Center; Tucson, Arizona
Feb. 1, 2001	No. 7	at Oregon	L 67–79	14–6 (6–2)	McArthur Court; Eugene, Oregon
Feb. 3, 2001	No. 7	at Oregon State	W 68–41	15–6 (7–2)	Gill Coliseum; Corvallis, Oregon
Feb. 8, 2001	No. 11	Washington	W 82–62	16–6 (8–2)	McKale Center; Tucson, Arizona
Feb. 10, 2001	No. 11	Washington State	W 86–51	17–6 (9–2)	McKale Center; Tucson, Arizona
Feb. 15, 2001	No. 8	at No. 24 UCLA; Rivalry	L 77–79 ^{OT}	17–7 (9–3)	Pauley Pavilion; Los Angeles
Feb. 17, 2001; CBS	No. 8	at USC	W 105–61	18–7 (10–3)	LA Sports Arena; Los Angeles, California
Feb. 21, 2001	No. 8	at Arizona State	W 88–58	19–7 (11–3)	Wells Fargo Arena; Tempe, Arizona
Mar. 1, 2001	No. 9	Oregon State	W 65–54	20–7 (12–3)	McKale Center; Tucson, Arizona
Mar. 3, 2001	No. 9	Oregon	W 104–65	21–7 (13–3)	McKale Center; Tucson, Arizona
Mar. 8, 2001	No. 8	at No. 1 Stanford	W 76–75	22–7 (14–3)	Maples Pavilion; Stanford, California
Mar. 10, 2001	No. 8	at California	W 78–76	23–7 (15–3)	Haas Pavilion; Berkeley, California
NCAA tournament
Mar. 16, 2001*; CBS	(2 MW) No. 5	vs. (15 MW) Eastern Illinois; First round	W 101–76	24–7	Kemper Arena; Kansas City, Missouri
Mar. 18, 2001*; CBS	(2 MW) No. 5	vs. (10 MW) Butler; Second round	W 73–52	25–7	Kemper Arena; Kansas City, Missouri
Mar. 23, 2001*; CBS	(2 MW) No. 5	vs. (3 MW) No. 14 Ole Miss; Midwest Regional semifinal – Sweet Sixteen	W 66–56	26–7	Alamodome; San Antonio, Texas
Mar. 25, 2001*; CBS	(2 MW) No. 5	vs. (1 MW) No. 4 Illinois; Midwest Regional Final – Elite Eight	W 87–81	27–7	Alamodome; San Antonio, Texas
Mar. 31, 2001*; CBS	(2 MW) No. 5	vs. (1 S) No. 3 Michigan State; National semifinal – Final Four	W 80–61	28–7	H.H.H. Metrodome; Minneapolis
Apr. 2, 2001*; CBS	(2 MW) No. 5	vs. (1 E) No. 1 Duke; National Championship	L 72–82	28–8	H.H.H. Metrodome; Minneapolis
*Non-conference game. ^{#}Rankings from AP Poll. (#) Tournament seedings in parentheses. All times are in Mountain Time.

=== NCAA basketball tournament ===
- Midwest
  - Arizona (#2 seed) 101, Eastern Illinois 76
  - Arizona 73, Butler 52
  - Arizona 66, Mississippi 56
  - Arizona 87, Illinois 81

- Final Four
  - Arizona 80, Michigan State 61
  - Duke 82, Arizona 72

== Rankings ==
Ranking movements Legend: ██ Increase in ranking ██ Decrease in ranking
	Week																			
Poll	Pre	1	2	3	4	5	6	7	8	9	10	11	12	13	14	15	16	17	18	Final
AP	1	1	1	5	5	7	10	12	16	21	17	12	7	11	8	8	9	8	5	Not released
Coaches	1	1^	2	5	5	6	8	10	15	20	17	13	9	10	8	8	7	7	4	2

*AP does not release post-NCAA Tournament rankings
^Coaches did not release a week 2 poll

== Team players drafted into the NBA ==
Round	Pick	Player	NBA club
1	13	Richard Jefferson	Houston Rockets
2	31	Gilbert Arenas	Golden State Warriors
2	32	Luke Walton	Los Angeles Lakers
2	38	Michael Wright	New York Knicks
2	45	Loren Woods	Minnesota Timberwolves
