= Bryan Bracey =

American basketball player (born 1978)

Personal information
- Born: August 5, 1978 (age 48) Chicago, Illinois, U.S.
- Listed height: 6 ft 7 in (2.01 m)
- Listed weight: 225 lb (102 kg)

Career information
- High school: Oak Park and River Forest (Oak Park, Illinois)
- College: Wisconsin–Platteville (1996–1997); Malcolm X (1998–1999); Oregon (1999–2001)
- NBA draft: 2001: 2nd round, 58th overall pick
- Playing career: 2001–2015
- Position: Small forward / power forward

Career history
- 2001: Fayetteville Patriots
- 2001–2002: Bnei Herzliya
- 2002: Air Avellino
- 2002–2003: Hapoel Jerusalem
- 2003: Murcia
- 2003–2004: Huntsville Flight
- 2004: Cedar Rapids River Raiders
- 2004–2005: Peristeri
- 2005: Dynamo Moscow Region
- 2005–2006: Makedonikos
- 2006–2007: Legea Scafati
- 2007: Criollos de Caguas
- 2007–2008: Élan Chalon
- 2008–2009: Dexia Mons-Hainaut
- 2009–2010: Proteas EKA AEL
- 2010–2011: Capitanes de Arecibo
- 2011: Pagrati
- 2013–2015: Chicago Steam

Career highlights
- Greek League All-Star (2006); Cypriot League All-Defensive team (2010); Second-team All-USBL (2004); First-team All-Pac-10 (2001)
- Stats at Basketball Reference

Bryan Patrick Bracey (born August 5, 1978) is an American-Irish former professional basketball player. He played college basketball at the University of Wisconsin–Platteville, Malcolm X College, and the University of Oregon. In 2001, he finished second in the Pac-10 in points per game and was selected to the All-Pac-10 first team. He was drafted in the second round (57th pick overall, the last pick) of the 2001 NBA draft by the San Antonio Spurs.

== Early life and college ==
Bracey was born in Chicago and graduated from Oak Park High School at Oak Park, Illinois in 1996. Bracey also has Irish citizenship. He played at University of Wisconsin–Platteville, under Bo Ryan, his first year after high school and contributed 4 points in the only game he saw the floor. He attended Malcolm X College, part of the City Colleges of Chicago, before transferring to the University of Oregon in 1999. In 2001, Bracey finished second in the Pac-10 with 18.6 points per game, led the Oregon Ducks with 7.1 rebounds per game, and was named to the All-Pac-10 first team. In January 2001, he was named Pac-10 Conference player of the week after averaging 25.5 points and 9 rebounds in two games.

== Professional career ==
In the 2001 NBA draft, the San Antonio Spurs selected Bracey as the 58th pick, the final overall pick. He never played a game for the Spurs or any other NBA team, making him 1 of 8 players from the 2001 NBA Draft to never play a game in the league.

Bracey debuted professionally with the Fayetteville Patriots of the NBA Development League but played only one game with that team. Bracey signed with Bnei Herzliya of Israeli Basketball Super League at the end of November 2001. He was credited for helping Herzliya rally from an 0–10 start in the season. Bracey left Israel in April 2002, during the Battle of Jenin.

Until being released in November 2002, Bracey played 10 games with the Italian team Air Avellino. He played until summer 2003 with Hapoel Jerusalem in Israel.
