= Jason Collins =

American basketball player (1978–2026)

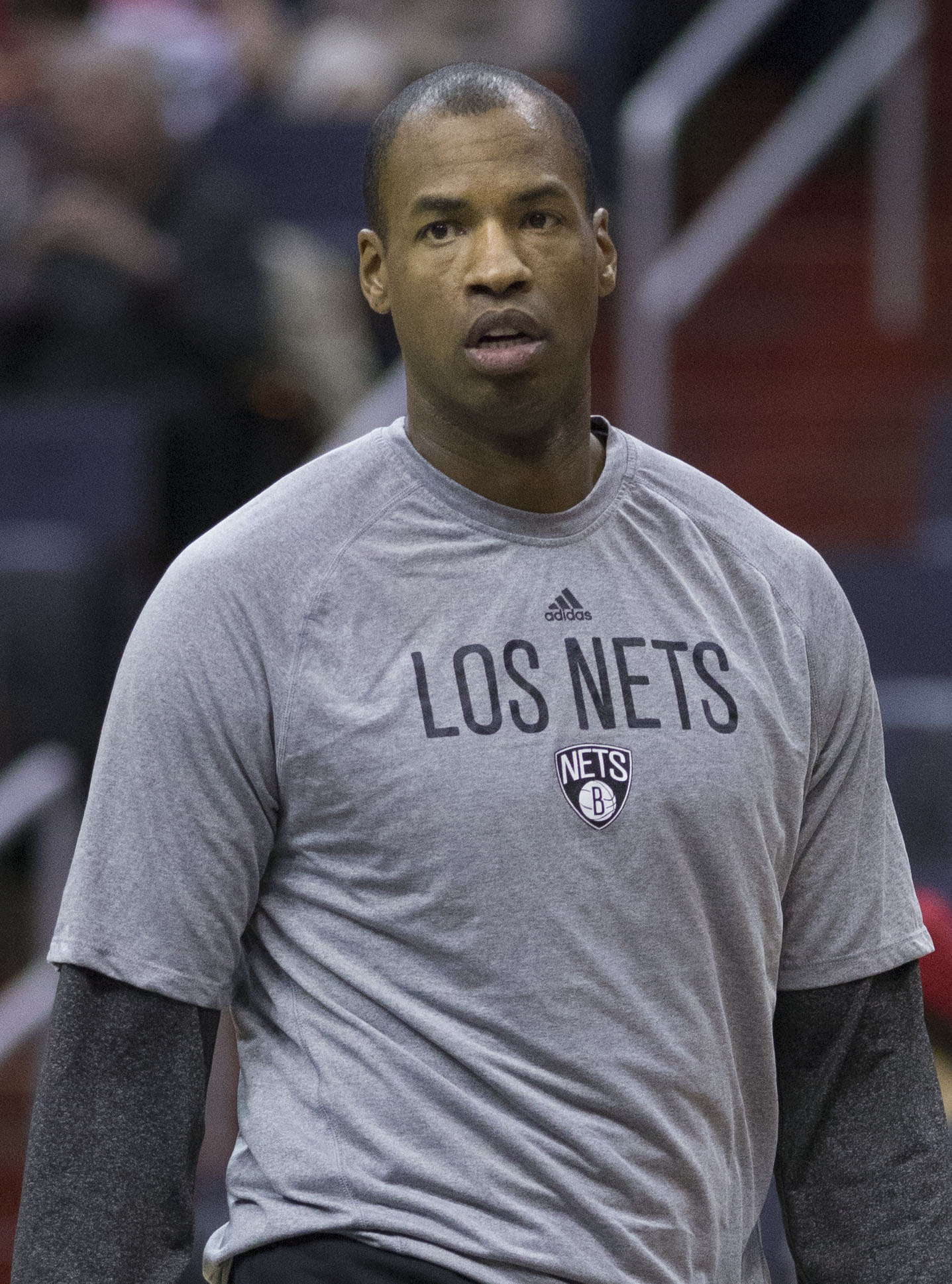
- Collins with the Brooklyn Nets in 2014

Personal information
- Born: December 2, 1978 Los Angeles, California, U.S.
- Died: May 12, 2026 (aged 47) Los Angeles, California, U.S.
- Listed height: 7 ft 0 in (2.13 m)
- Listed weight: 255 lb (116 kg)

Career information
- High school: Harvard-Westlake (Los Angeles, California)
- College: Stanford (1997–2001)
- NBA draft: 2001: 1st round, 18th overall pick
- Drafted by: Houston Rockets
- Playing career: 2001–2014
- Position: Center
- Number: 35, 34, 98, 46

Career history
- 2001–2008: New Jersey Nets
- 2008: Memphis Grizzlies
- 2008–2009: Minnesota Timberwolves
- 2009–2012: Atlanta Hawks
- 2012–2013: Boston Celtics
- 2013: Washington Wizards
- 2014: Brooklyn Nets

Career highlights
- Third-team All-American – NABC (2001); Pete Newell Big Man Award (2001); First-team All-Pac-10 (2001); Fourth-team Parade All-American (1997); McDonald's All-American (1997)

Career NBA statistics
- Points: 2,621 (3.6 ppg)
- Rebounds: 2,706 (3.7 rpg)
- Assists: 626 (0.9 apg)
- Stats at NBA.com
- Stats at Basketball Reference

Jason Paul Collins (December 2, 1978 – May 12, 2026) was an American professional basketball player who was a center for 13 seasons in the National Basketball Association (NBA). He played college basketball for the Stanford Cardinal, earning third-team All-American honors in 2001. Collins was selected by the Houston Rockets in the first round of the 2001 NBA draft with the 18th overall pick. He went on to play for the New Jersey Nets, Memphis Grizzlies, Minnesota Timberwolves, Atlanta Hawks, Boston Celtics, Washington Wizards, and Brooklyn Nets.

After the 2012–13 NBA season concluded, Collins publicly came out as gay. He became a free agent and did not play again until February 2014, when he signed with the Nets and became the first publicly gay athlete to play in any of the four major North American pro sports leagues. In 2014, Collins was featured on the cover of Time's "100 Most Influential People in the World". He died of glioblastoma on May 12, 2026, at the age of 47.

== Early life ==
Collins was born on December 2, 1978 in the Northridge neighborhood of Los Angeles, California. He was born eight minutes ahead of his twin brother, Jarron, who also became an NBA player.

Both brothers graduated from Harvard-Westlake School in Studio City. He and Jarron won two California Interscholastic Federation state titles during their four-year careers with a combined record of 123–10. Collins broke the California career rebounding record with 1,500. Collins was backed up by future actor Jason Segel, who USA Today opined might have ended up being the most famous player from the team.

== College career ==
Collins played at Stanford University with brother Jarron for the Cardinal in the Pacific-10 Conference (Pac-10). As a freshman in 1997–98, Collins played just one game before injuring his knee and missing the rest of the season. Stanford advanced to the Final Four that season for the first time since 1942. After playing only eight games in his first two seasons, Collins appeared in 31 games, starting in 11, as a junior in 1999–2000. He averaged 8.3 points and 6.1 rebounds to help the Cardinal tie for a Pac-10 title and earn a No. 1 seed in the 2000 NCAA tournament.

As a senior in 2000–01, Collins averaged 14.5 points and 7.8 rebounds. He was named to the All-Pac-10 first team, and the National Association of Basketball Coaches (NABC) voted him to their third-team All-American team. Stanford won the Pac-10 championship and reached the Elite Eight in the 2001 NCAA tournament. He finished his college career ranked first in Stanford history for field goal percentage (.608) and third in blocked shots (89).

== Professional career ==
=== New Jersey Nets (2001–2008) ===
As a rookie along with Richard Jefferson, Collins played a significant role in the New Jersey Nets' first-ever NBA Finals berth in 2002 against the Los Angeles Lakers. During this Finals appearance, Collins acknowledged that he is not really 7 feet tall as he has been listed since his junior year of college. He was measured 6 ft 10¼ in at the 2001 NBA combine.

In the 2002–03 NBA season Collins took over the starting center role for the Nets and helped the franchise back to the NBA Finals. During that season, Collins averaged 5.7 points and 4.5 rebounds per game. Prior to the 2004–05 season, he signed a $25 million contract extension with New Jersey for five more years.

=== Memphis Grizzlies (2008) ===
On February 4, 2008, Collins was traded along with cash considerations to the Memphis Grizzlies for Stromile Swift.

=== Minnesota Timberwolves (2008–2009) ===
On June 26, 2008, Collins was dealt to the Minnesota Timberwolves in an eight-player deal involving Kevin Love and O. J. Mayo.

=== Atlanta Hawks (2009–2012) ===
Collins signed with the Atlanta Hawks on September 2, 2009. Collins re-signed with the Hawks in the 2010 offseason. In 2010–11, the fifth-seeded Hawks defeated the fourth-seeded Orlando Magic as Collins slowed the Magic's dominant center, Dwight Howard. After Game 4 in the series, then-Orlando coach Stan Van Gundy called Collins's play "the best defense on [Howard] all year".

=== Boston Celtics (2012–2013) ===
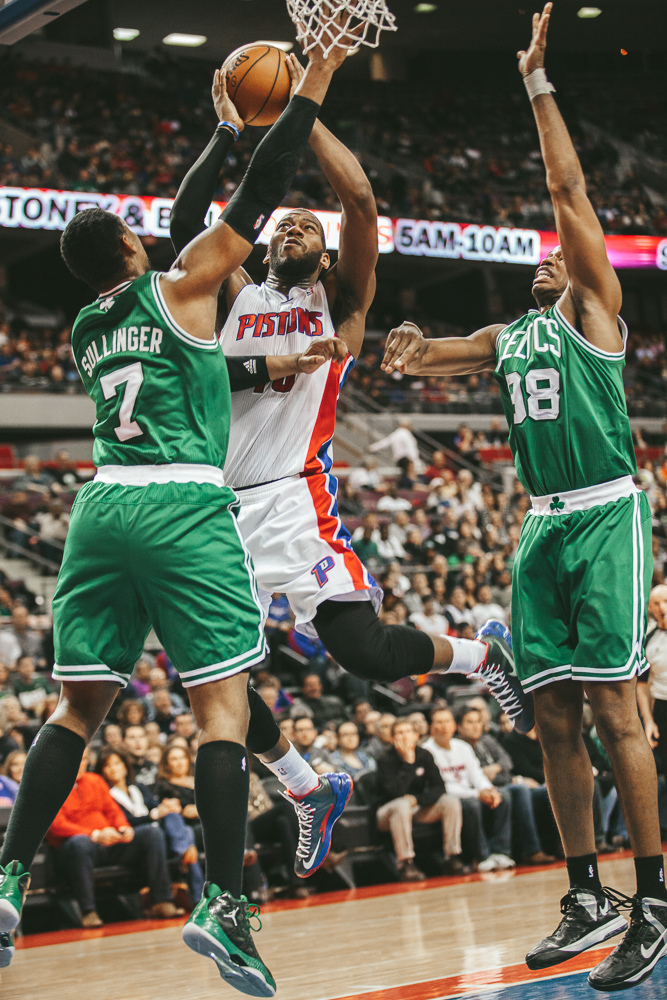
Collins (right) and Celtics teammate Jared Sullinger (left) defend Detroit's Greg Monroe

On July 31, 2012, Collins signed a contract with the Boston Celtics. He averaged 10.3 minutes in 32 games with Boston, starting in 7.

=== Washington Wizards (2013) ===
On February 21, 2013, Collins and Leandro Barbosa were traded to the Washington Wizards in exchange for Jordan Crawford.

On April 29, 2013, after the season had already concluded, Collins publicly came out as gay, becoming the first active male athlete from one of the four major North American professional team sports to publicly do so. Collins became a free agent in July 2013, and stated that he intended to pursue another contract. He was not invited by any team to training camp, but he worked out at his home waiting for an opportunity.

=== Brooklyn Nets (2014) ===
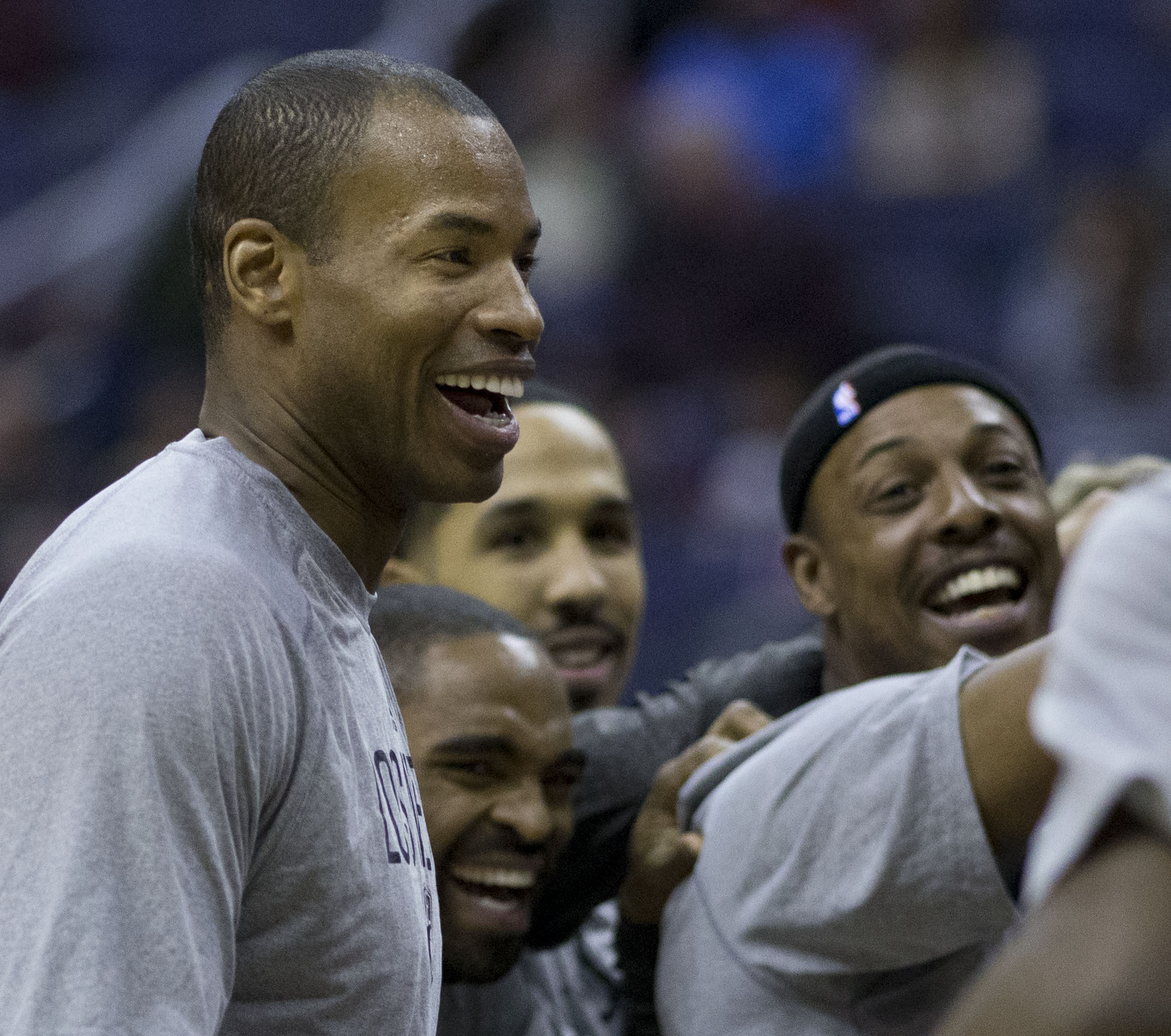
Collins huddles with the Nets before playing the Washington Wizards in 2014

On February 23, 2014, Collins signed a 10-day contract to rejoin the Nets, who had since moved to Brooklyn. Nets coach Jason Kidd, who became good friends with Collins while teammates in New Jersey from 2001 to 2008, was an advocate of signing Collins. Collins played 11 minutes that night against the Lakers at the Staples Center, becoming the first publicly gay athlete to play in any of the four major North American professional sports leagues. Collins wore jersey number 46 (the only number the team had available at the time) in his first game of the season, but planned to wear No. 98—the same number he wore with Boston and Washington—going forward. Collins chose to wear No. 98 in honor of Matthew Shepard, whose 1998 murder was widely reported as a hate crime and ultimately led to the passage of the Matthew Shepard and James Byrd Jr. Hate Crimes Prevention Act. Collins's jersey rose to the top spot for sales in the NBA's online shop, and the NBA announced that proceeds from the sales, as well as proceeds from auctions of Collins's autographed game-worn jerseys, would benefit the Matthew Shepard Foundation, and the Gay, Lesbian & Straight Education Network (GLSEN).

On March 5, 2014, Collins signed a second 10-day contract with the Nets. On March 15, he signed with the Nets for the rest of the season.

On November 19, 2014, Collins announced his retirement from professional basketball after 13 seasons in the NBA.

== Player profile ==
Collins had low career averages in the NBA of 3.6 points, 3.7 rebounds, 0.5 blocks, and 41 percent shooting from the field, and never averaged more than seven points or seven rebounds in a season. However, the basketball analytics community valued his defense through measurements not typically found in a boxscore. Collins was a physical player defending the post, boxed out well, and excelled at setting screens. He was precise in executing coaches' defensive strategies, and he read the opponents' movements well and communicated on defense. He also had a reputation for being a team leader, and earned consistent praise for his professionalism and intelligence on the court.

== Personal life ==
Collins was in an eight-year relationship with former WNBA center Carolyn Moos, and the two were engaged to be married, but Collins called off the wedding in 2009.

In January 2014, The Hollywood Reporter reported that Collins was dating film producer Brunson Green. The pair married in May 2025.

=== Coming out ===
In the cover story of the May 6, 2013, issue of Sports Illustrated, a first person story by Collins with journalist Franz Lidz, and posted on the magazine's website on April 29, 2013, he came out as gay, becoming the first active male athlete from one of the four major North American professional team sports to publicly do so. He was motivated to go public after his former college roommate Joe Kennedy, who had become a politician, marched in the 2012 Boston gay pride parade as a straight man, while Collins remained closeted. He wrote that he wished to maintain his privacy in regard to specific details of his personal life, and that he was not in a relationship. Collins also said a "notorious antigay hate crime", the murder of Matthew Shepard in 1998, led him to choose "98" for his jersey number, in Shepard's honor. Collins called the number "a statement to myself, my family and my friends".

Following his announcement, Collins had received high praise and support for deciding to publicly reveal that he was gay. Fellow NBA star Kobe Bryant praised his decision, as did others from around the league, including NBA commissioner David Stern. President Barack Obama, First Lady Michelle Obama, former president Bill Clinton, and Collins's corporate sponsor Nike were also among those offering their praise and support for Collins. However, ESPN basketball analyst Chris Broussard stated that he did not believe that Collins could "live an openly homosexual lifestyle" and be a Christian, but thought that Collins "displayed bravery with his announcement". Collins, a Christian, responded by saying "This is all about tolerance and acceptance and America is the best country in the world because we're all entitled to our opinions and beliefs but we don't have to agree. And obviously I don't agree with his statement." The Guardian called it significant for LGBTQ acceptance "as professional sports had long been seen as the final frontier". Given the interest in major league team sports in the United States, The Christian Science Monitor wrote that Collins's announcement was "likely to put wind in the sails of this trend" of acceptance of gay rights in U.S. public opinion. Former tennis player Martina Navratilova, who came out as a lesbian in 1981, called Collins a "game-changer" for team sports, which she referred to as one of the last areas where homophobia remained.

On the day it was released, the Sports Illustrated story drew a record 3.7 million visitors to the magazine's website, SI.com.

The New York Times called his 2014 signing with Brooklyn "perhaps basketball's most celebrated and scrutinized 10-day contract". His No. 98 jersey became the top seller on the NBA's online store.

== Illness and death ==
On September 11, 2025, the NBA released a statement on behalf of Collins's family announcing his ongoing treatment for a brain tumor. On December 11, Collins revealed he was diagnosed with "stage 4 glioblastoma".

Collins died at his home in Los Angeles on May 12, 2026, at the age of 47.

== Career statistics ==
Legend
GP	Games played	GS	Games started	MPG	Minutes per game
FG%	Field goal percentage	3P%	3-point field goal percentage	FT%	Free throw percentage
RPG	Rebounds per game	APG	Assists per game	SPG	Steals per game
BPG	Blocks per game	PPG	Points per game	**Bold**	Career high

=== NBA ===
==== Regular season ====
Year	Team	GP	GS	MPG	FG%	3P%	FT%	RPG	APG	SPG	BPG	PPG
2001–02	New Jersey	77	9	18.3	.421	.500	.701	3.9	1.1	.4	.6	4.5
2002–03	New Jersey	**81**	66	23.5	.414	.000	.763	4.5	1.1	.6	.5	5.7
2003–04	New Jersey	78	78	28.5	.424	.000	.739	5.1	**2.0**	**.9**	.7	5.9
2004–05	New Jersey	80	**80**	**31.8**	.412	.333	.656	**6.1**	1.3	**.9**	**.9**	**6.4**
2005–06	New Jersey	71	70	26.7	.397	.250	.512	4.8	1.0	.6	.6	3.6
2006–07	New Jersey	80	78	23.1	.364	.000	.465	4.0	.6	.5	.5	2.1
2007–08	New Jersey	43	23	15.9	.426	—	.389	2.1	.4	.3	.2	1.4
2007–08	Memphis	31	3	15.7	**.508**	.000	.526	2.9	.2	.4	.5	2.6
2008–09	Minnesota	31	22	13.6	.314	—	.464	2.3	.4	.3	.4	1.8
2009–10	Atlanta	24	0	4.8	.348	.000	.000	.6	.2	.1	.1	.7
2010–11	Atlanta	49	28	12.1	.479	**1.000**	.659	2.1	.4	.2	.2	2.0
2011–12	Atlanta	30	10	10.3	.400	—	.467	1.6	.3	.1	.1	1.3
2012–13	Boston	32	7	10.3	.348	—	.700	1.6	.2	.3	.2	1.2
2012–13	Washington	6	2	9.0	.167	—	**1.000**	1.3	.3	.3	.7	.7
2013–14	Brooklyn	22	1	7.8	.458	.000	.750	0.9	.2	.4	.0	1.1
Career		735	477	20.4	.411	.206	.647	3.7	.9	.5	.5	3.6

==== Playoffs ====
Year	Team	GP	GS	MPG	FG%	3P%	FT%	RPG	APG	SPG	BPG	PPG
2002	New Jersey	17	0	13.4	.364	—	.658	2.4	.4	.3	.4	2.9
2003	New Jersey	**20**	**20**	26.5	.363	.000	**.836**	6.3	.9	**.7**	.6	**5.9**
2004	New Jersey	11	11	24.2	.368	—	.750	4.0	**1.5**	.3	**.9**	3.6
2005	New Jersey	4	4	**32.0**	.235	—	.375	**6.5**	.3	.5	.0	2.8
2006	New Jersey	11	11	27.5	.360	—	.591	5.0	.3	.5	.2	2.8
2007	New Jersey	12	12	27.4	.571	—	.364	3.3	.2	.6	.3	2.3
2010	Atlanta	3	0	3.3	.600	—	—	1.7	.0	.0	.0	2.0
2011	Atlanta	12	9	13.2	**.643**	—	.375	1.4	.1	.4	.3	1.8
2012	Atlanta	5	4	17.0	.545	—	—	2.4	.0	.2	.0	2.4
Career		95	71	21.4	.400	.000	.677	3.8	.5	.4	.4	3.3

=== College ===
Year	Team	GP	GS	MPG	FG%	3P%	FT%	RPG	APG	SPG	BPG	PPG
1997–98	Stanford	1	0	15.0	.250	–	.714	6.0	.0	.0	.0	7.0
1998–99	Stanford	7	0	12.7	.500	–	.478	3.3	.3	.1	.4	4.1
1999–00	Stanford	31	11	19.6	**.622**	.000	.662	6.1	.1	.2	**1.4**	8.3
2000–01	Stanford	**34**	**34**	**26.3**	.620	**.462**	**.784**	**7.8**	**1.5**	**.8**	1.3	**14.5**
Career		73	45	22.0	.612	.444	.716	6.6	.8	.5	1.2	10.8

== Awards ==
On August 2, 2013, Collins was among the first class of inductees into the National Gay and Lesbian Sports Hall of Fame.

== See also ==
- Homosexuality in sports
  - Homosexuality in sports in the United States
- List of lesbian, gay, bisexual, and transgender sportspeople
