= Sean Lampley =

American basketball player (born 1979)

Personal information
- Born: September 3, 1979 (age 47) Harvey, Illinois, U.S.
- Listed height: 6 ft 7 in (2.01 m)
- Listed weight: 227 lb (103 kg)

Career information
- High school: St. Francis de Sales (Chicago, Illinois)
- College: California (1997–2001)
- NBA draft: 2001: 2nd round, 44th overall pick
- Drafted by: Chicago Bulls
- Playing career: 2002–2009
- Position: Small forward
- Number: 21

Career history
- 2002: Saskatchewan Hawks
- 2002: Red Bull Thunder
- 2002–2003: Miami Heat
- 2003: Dakota Wizards
- 2003: Golden State Warriors
- 2004: Makedonikos
- 2004–2005: Dakota Wizards
- 2005–2006: Barangay Ginebra Kings
- 2006: Artland Dragons
- 2007: Clinicas Rincón Axarquía
- 2007–2008: Melbourne Tigers
- 2008–2009: Al Jaysh Army SC Doha

Career highlights
- CBA All-Rookie Team (2002); Pac-10 Player of the Year (2001); 2× First-team All-Pac-10 (2000, 2001)
- Stats at NBA.com
- Stats at Basketball Reference

Sean Lampley (born September 3, 1979) is an American former professional basketball player.

== College career ==
Lampley played at the University of California, leading the Golden Bears to victory over Clemson in the 1999 National Invitational Tournament and earning MVP honors. In 2001, he led the team to the NCAA Tournament, but the Bears lost in the first round to Fresno State. Lampley ended his career as the only player in school history to rank in the top 10 in points (1,776, 1st), rebounds (889, 4th) and assists (295, 10th). He was named Pac-10 Player of the Year and Honorable Mention All-America his senior year by the AP.

Lampley's career scoring record stood until he was surpassed by point guard Jerome Randle on March 13, 2010, with 1,790 career points.

== Professional career ==
Lampley was selected by the Chicago Bulls in the 2nd round (44th pick) of the 2001 NBA draft. He began his career with the Saskatchewan Hawks of the Continental Basketball Association (CBA) and earned All-Rookie Team honors in 2002. Although he never wore a Bulls uniform, Lampley played 35 games for the Miami Heat during the 2002–03 season and 10 games for the Golden State Warriors during the 2003–04 season. He competed with the Sacramento Kings in 2006 summer league play.

Lampley only played a total of 45 games in his NBA career with career averages of 4.5 points and 2.1 rebounds. His final NBA game was played on December 12, 2003, in an 85–96 loss to the New Orleans Hornets where he recorded 9 points and 2 rebounds.

=== Oceania career ===
Lampley signed with the Melbourne Tigers of Australia's National Basketball League in December 2007. After arriving in the country only 2 days prior, Lampley made his debut in the NBL's biggest attendance of the season, scoring 10 points (on 3/5 shooting) and pulling down 4 rebounds in the Tigers' victory over the South Dragons at Melbourne Arena on December 15. He played with the Oaks Card Club squad in 2006–2007. His signing filled the void left by recently de-listed player Martin Muursepp, who suffered from poor form partly due to an ongoing battle with an ankle injury. Lampley sunk a 3 as time expired to get the Tigers ahead 2–1 against the Sydney kings in the 2007–2008 finals.
