= 2000–01 Washington Huskies men's basketball team =

American college basketball season

2000–01 Washington Huskies men's basketball
- Conference: Pacific-10 Conference
- Record: 10–20 (4–14 Pac-10)
- Head coach: Bob Bender (8th season)
- Home arena: Hec Edmundson Pavilion

2000–01 Pacific-10 Conference men's basketball standings
	Conf.				Overall
Team	W		L	PCT	W		L	PCT
No. 5 Stanford	16	–	2	.889	31	–	3	.912
No. 2 Arizona	15	–	3	.833	28	–	8	.778
No. 12 UCLA	14	–	4	.778	23	–	9	.719
No. 14 USC	11	–	7	.611	24	–	10	.706
California	11	–	7	.611	20	–	11	.645
Oregon	5	–	13	.278	14	–	14	.500
Arizona State	5	–	13	.278	13	–	16	.448
Washington State	5	–	13	.278	12	–	16	.429
Oregon State	4	–	14	.222	10	–	20	.333
Washington	4	–	14	.222	10	–	20	.333
As of November 30, 2007; Rankings from Coaches Poll

The 2000–01 Washington Huskies men's basketball team represented the University of Washington for the 2000–01 NCAA Division I men's basketball season. Led by eighth-year head coach Bob Bender, the Huskies were members of the Pacific-10 Conference and played their home games on campus at newly renovated Hec Edmundson Pavilion in Seattle, Washington.

The Huskies were 10–20 overall in the regular season and 4–14 in conference play, tied for last in the standings. There was no conference tournament this season; last played in 1990, it resumed in 2002.

In the season finale, the Huskies upset #13 UCLA 96–94; senior guard Michael Johnson hit a three-pointer with a second remaining to break an eight-game losing streak.
