= 2000–01 USC Trojans men's basketball team =

American college basketball season

2000–01 USC Trojans men's basketball

NCAA tournament, Elite Eight
- Conference: Pacific-10 Conference

Ranking
- Coaches: No. 14
- Record: 24–10 (11–7 Pac-10)
- Head coach: Henry Bibby (5th season)
- Home arena: L. A. Sports Arena

2000–01 Pacific-10 Conference men's basketball standings
	Conf.				Overall
Team	W		L	PCT	W		L	PCT
No. 5 Stanford	16	–	2	.889	31	–	3	.912
No. 2 Arizona	15	–	3	.833	28	–	8	.778
No. 12 UCLA	14	–	4	.778	23	–	9	.719
No. 14 USC	11	–	7	.611	24	–	10	.706
California	11	–	7	.611	20	–	11	.645
Oregon	5	–	13	.278	14	–	14	.500
Arizona State	5	–	13	.278	13	–	16	.448
Washington State	5	–	13	.278	12	–	16	.429
Oregon State	4	–	14	.222	10	–	20	.333
Washington	4	–	14	.222	10	–	20	.333
As of November 30, 2007; Rankings from Coaches Poll

The 2000–01 USC Trojans men's basketball team represented the University of Southern California during the 2000–01 NCAA Division I men's basketball season. Led by head coach Henry Bibby, they played their home games at the L. A. Sports Arena in Los Angeles, California as members of the Pac-10 Conference. The Trojans finished the season with a record of 24–10 (11–7 Pac-10) and made a run to the Elite Eight of the NCAA tournament.

== Roster ==
2000–01 USC Trojans men's basketball team
Players
Coaches

Pos.	#	Name	Height	Weight	Year	Previous school	Hometown
G	5	Brandon Granville	5 ft 9 in (1.75 m)	—	Jr
G	12	Jeff Trepagnier	6 ft 4 in (1.93 m)	—	Sr	Compton	Compton, California
G	22	Errick Craven	6 ft 2 in (1.88 m)	195 lb (88 kg)	Fr	Bishop Montgomery	Carson, California
F/C	24	Brian Scalabrine	6 ft 9 in (2.06 m)	—	Sr	Enumclaw	Enumclaw, Washington
G	33	Desmon Farmer	6 ft 5 in (1.96 m)	210 lb (95 kg)	Fr	Northwestern	Flint, Michigan
F/C	50	Sam Clancy	6 ft 7 in (2.01 m)	250 lb (113 kg)	Jr	St. Edward	Lakewood, Ohio

Head coach

- Henry Bibby (UCLA)

Assistant coach(es)

Legend

- (C) Team captain
- (S) Suspended
- (I) Ineligible
- (W) Walk-on
- Injured
- Current redshirt

== Schedule and results ==
Date time, TV	Rank^{#}	Opponent^{#}	Result	Record	Site (attendance) city, state
Non-conference regular season
Nov 18, 2000*	No. 23	Bradley	W 107–92	1–0	L.A. Sports Arena; Los Angeles, California
Nov 21, 2000*	No. 20	San Diego	W 78–67	2–0	L.A. Sports Arena; Los Angeles, California
Nov 25, 2000*	No. 20	Loyola Marymount	W 91–68	3–0	L.A. Sports Arena; Los Angeles, California
Dec 2, 2000*	No. 15	No. 18 Utah	W 65–60	4–0	L.A. Sports Arena; Los Angeles, California
Dec 5, 2000*	No. 12	Cal State Northridge	W 99–90	5–0	L.A. Sports Arena; Los Angeles, California
Dec 9, 2000*	No. 12	at UC Santa Barbara	W 75–73	6–0	The Thunderdome; Santa Barbara, California
Dec 14, 2000*	No. 13	Pepperdine	W 76–73	7–0	L.A. Sports Arena; Los Angeles, California
Dec 21, 2000	No. 13	at BYU-Hawaii	W 86–74	8–0	Cannon Activities Center; Laie, Hawaii
Dec 22, 2000*	No. 13	vs. No. 24 Ole Miss	L 83–84 ^{OT}	8–1	Cannon Activities Center; Laie, Hawaii
Dec 23, 2000*	No. 13	vs. BYU	W 70–67	9–1	Cannon Activities Center; Laie, Hawaii
Dec 27, 2000*	No. 16	at Northwestern	L 61–63	9–2	Welsh-Ryan Arena; Evanston, Illinois
Dec 30, 2000*	No. 16	Long Beach State	W 95–73	10–2	L.A. Sports Arena; Los Angeles, California
Pac-10 regular season
Jan 4, 2001	No. 20	Washington State	W 82–59	11–2 (1–0)	L.A. Sports Arena; Los Angeles, California
Jan 6, 2001	No. 20	Washington	W 87–61	12–2 (2–0)	L.A. Sports Arena; Los Angeles, California
Jan 11, 2001	No. 19	at UCLA	L 75–80	12–3 (2–1)	Pauley Pavilion; Los Angeles, California
Jan 18, 2001	No. 24	at No. 17 Arizona	L 58–71	12–4 (2–2)	McKale Center; Tucson, Arizona
Jan 20, 2001	No. 24	at Arizona State	W 77–58	13–4 (3–2)	Wells Fargo Arena; Tempe, Arizona
Jan 25, 2001	No. 25	Oregon	W 78–74	14–4 (4–2)	L.A. Sports Arena; Los Angeles, California
Jan 27, 2001	No. 25	Oregon State	W 73–47	15–4 (5–2)	L.A. Sports Arena; Los Angeles, California
Feb 1, 2001	No. 21	at No. 1 Stanford	L 71–77	15–5 (5–3)	Maples Pavilion; Stanford, California
Feb 3, 2001	No. 21	at California	W 80–66	16–5 (6–3)	Haas Pavilion; Berkeley, California
Feb 8, 2001	No. 22	UCLA	L 76–85	16–6 (6–4)	L.A. Sports Arena; Los Angeles, California
Feb 15, 2001		Arizona State	W 80–68	17–6 (7–4)	L.A. Sports Arena; Los Angeles, California
Feb 17, 2001		No. 8 Arizona	L 61–105	17–7 (7–5)	L.A. Sports Arena; Los Angeles, California
Feb 22, 2001		at Oregon State	L 52–67	17–8 (7–6)	Gill Coliseum; Corvallis, Oregon
Feb 24, 2001		at Oregon	W 87–80 ^{OT}	18–8 (8–6)	McArthur Court; Eugene, Oregon
Mar 1, 2001		No. 1 Stanford	L 68–70	18–9 (8–7)	L.A. Sports Arena; Los Angeles, California
Mar 3, 2001		California	W 74–69	19–9 (9–7)	L.A. Sports Arena; Los Angeles, California
Mar 8, 2001		at Washington	W 85–56	20–9 (10–7)	Bank of America Arena; Seattle, Washington
Mar 10, 2001		at Washington State	W 78–63	21–9 (11–7)	Friel Court; Pullman, Washington
NCAA Tournament
Mar 15, 2001*	(6 E)	vs. (11 E) Oklahoma State; First round	W 69–54	22–9	Nassau Coliseum (13,817); Uniondale, New York
Mar 17, 2001*	(6 E)	vs. (3 E) No. 7 Boston College; Second Round	W 74–71	23–9	Nassau Coliseum; Uniondale, New York
Mar 22, 2001*	(6 E)	vs. (2 E) No. 9 Kentucky; East Regional semifinal – Sweet Sixteen	W 80–76	24–9	First Union Center; Philadelphia, Pennsylvania
Mar 24, 2001*	(6 E)	vs. (1 E) No. 1 Duke; East Regional final – Elite Eight	L 69–79	24–10	First Union Center (20,270); Philadelphia, Pennsylvania
*Non-conference game. ^{#}Rankings from AP Poll. (#) Tournament seedings in parentheses. E=East. All times are in Pacific Time.

== Team Players in the 2001 NBA draft ==
Round	Pick	Player	NBA club
2	34	Brian Scalabrine	New Jersey Nets
2	36	Jeff Trepagnier	Cleveland Cavaliers
