= 2000–01 UCLA Bruins men's basketball team =

American college basketball season

2000–01 UCLA Bruins men's basketball

NCAA tournament, Sweet Sixteen
- Conference: Pacific-10

Ranking
- Coaches: No. 12
- AP: No. 15
- Record: 23–9 (14–4 Pac-10)
- Head coach: Steve Lavin (5th season)
- Assistant coaches: Michael Holton; Jim Saia; Steve Spencer
- Home arena: Pauley Pavilion

2000–01 Pacific-10 Conference men's basketball standings
	Conf.				Overall
Team	W		L	PCT	W		L	PCT
No. 5 Stanford	16	–	2	.889	31	–	3	.912
No. 2 Arizona	15	–	3	.833	28	–	8	.778
No. 12 UCLA	14	–	4	.778	23	–	9	.719
No. 14 USC	11	–	7	.611	24	–	10	.706
California	11	–	7	.611	20	–	11	.645
Oregon	5	–	13	.278	14	–	14	.500
Arizona State	5	–	13	.278	13	–	16	.448
Washington State	5	–	13	.278	12	–	16	.429
Oregon State	4	–	14	.222	10	–	20	.333
Washington	4	–	14	.222	10	–	20	.333
As of November 30, 2007; Rankings from Coaches Poll

The 2000–01 UCLA Bruins men's basketball team represented the University of California, Los Angeles in the 2000–01 NCAA Division I men's basketball season. The team finished 3rd in the Pacific-10 Conference with a 14–4 conference record, 23–9 overall. The Bruins competed in the 2001 NCAA Division I men's basketball tournament, losing to the eventual champion Duke Blue Devils in the sweet sixteen.

== Roster ==
2000–01 UCLA Bruins men's basketball team
Players
Coaches

Pos.	#	Name	Height	Weight	Year	Hometown
G	21	Ryan Bailey (C)	6 ft 2 in (1.88 m)	—	Sr
F	23	Matt Barnes	6 ft 7 in (2.01 m)	226 lb (103 kg)	Jr	Santa Clara, California
F	43	T. J. Cummings	6 ft 10 in (2.08 m)	223 lb (101 kg)	Fr	Homewood, Illinois
G	1	Jason Flowers	—	—	Sr
C	50	Dan Gadzuric	6 ft 11 in (2.11 m)	240 lb (109 kg)	Jr	The Hague, Netherlands
F	24	Jason Kapono	6 ft 7 in (2.01 m)	—	So	Long Beach, California
F	3	Billy Knight	—	—	Jr
G	15	Ryan Mollins	—	—	Fr
G		Sam Nelson	—	—	So
G	11	Todd Ramasar	6 ft 5 in (1.96 m)	—	Jr
G	2	Janou Rubin	—	—	Fr
G	25	Earl Watson (C)	6 ft 1 in (1.85 m)	—	Sr	Kansas City, Kansas
G	34	Ray Young	—	—	Jr

Head coach

Steve Lavin (Chapman)

Assistant coach(es)

- Michael Holton (UCLA)
- Jim Saia (Chapman)
- Steve Spencer (Somona State)

Legend

- (C) Team captain
- (S) Suspended
- (I) Ineligible
- (W) Walk-on
- Injured
- Current redshirt

Roster
Last update: 30 January 2018

== Schedule ==
Date time, TV	Rank^{#}	Opponent^{#}	Result	Record	Site city, state
Exhibition
November 1, 2000		vs. Team Concept; Exhibition	W 118–64	0–0	Pauley Pavilion; Los Angeles, CA
November 15, 2000		vs. EA Sports/California All-Stars; Exhibition	W 81–78	0–0	Pauley Pavilion; Los Angeles, CA
Regular Season
November 9, 2000; ESPN2	No. 17	vs. No. 7 Kansas; Coaches vs Cancer Tournament	L 98–99	0–1	Madison Square Garden (16,415); New York, NY
November 10, 2000; ESPN2	No. 17	vs. No. 12 Kentucky; Coaches vs Cancer Tournament	W 97–92 ^{OT}	1–1	Madison Square Garden (19,528); New York, NY
November 21, 2000; FSNW2	No. 15	Cal State Northridge	L 74–78	1–2	Pauley Pavilion (6,448); Los Angeles, CA
November 29, 2000; FSNW2		UC Santa Barbara	W 83–77	2–2	Pauley Pavilion (6,927); Los Angeles, CA
December 2, 2000; KCAL		vs. Georgia Tech; John R. Wooden Classic	L 67–72	2–3	Arrowhead Pond of Anaheim (15,280); Anaheim, CA
December 9, 2000; FSNW		Hawaii	W 84–64	3–3	Pauley Pavilion (6,604); Los Angeles, CA
December 16, 2000; FSNW2		UC Irvine	W 65–60	4–3	Pauley Pavilion (6,974); Los Angeles, CA
December 23, 2000; CBS		No. 15 North Carolina	L 70–80	4–4	Pauley Pavilion (10,593); Los Angeles, CA
December 30, 2000; FSNW		at Purdue	W 87–82	5–4	Mackey Arena (13,253); West Lafayette, IN
January 4, 2001; FSNW2		Washington	W 86–64	6–4 (1–0)	Pauley Pavilion (7,354); Los Angeles, CA
January 6, 2001; FSN		Washington State	W 75–57	7–4 (2–0)	Pauley Pavilion (6,892); Los Angeles, CA
January 11, 2001; FSN		No. 19 USC	W 80–75	8–4 (3–0)	Pauley Pavilion (12,109); Los Angeles, CA
January 13, 2001; CBS		Villanova	W 93–65	9–4 (3–0)	Pauley Pavilion (9,798); Los Angeles, CA
January 18, 2001; FSNW		at Arizona State	W 91–83	10–4 (4–0)	Wells Fargo Arena (7,002); Tempe, AZ
January 20, 2001; FSN		at No. 17 Arizona	L 63–88	10–5 (4–1)	McKale Center (14,562); Tucson, AZ
January 25, 2001; FSNW2		Oregon State	W 67–40	11–5 (5–1)	Pauley Pavilion (6,208); Los Angeles, CA
January 27, 2001; FSN		Oregon	W 98–88	12–5 (6–1)	Pauley Pavilion (6,957); Los Angeles, CA
February 1, 2001; FSNW2		at California	L 63–92	12–6 (6–2)	Haas Pavilion (12,172); Berkeley, CA
February 3, 2001; ABC		at No. 1 Stanford	W 79–73	13–6 (7–2)	Maples Pavilion (7,391); Stanford, CA
February 8, 2001; FSNW2		at No. 22 USC	W 85–76	14–6 (8–2)	Los Angeles Memorial Sports Arena (16,409); Los Angeles, CA
February 10, 2001; ABC		at DePaul	W 94–88	15–6	Allstate Arena (12,236); Chicago, IL
February 15, 2001; FSN	No. 24	No. 8 Arizona	W 79–77 ^{OT}	16–6 (9–2)	Pauley Pavilion (12,386); Los Angeles, CA
February 17, 2001; CBS	No. 24	Arizona State	W 73–68	17–6 (10–2)	Pauley Pavilion (7,953); Los Angeles, CA
February 22, 2001; FSNW2	No. 15	at Oregon	W 88–73	18–6 (11–2)	McArthur Court (9,087); Eugene, OR
February 24, 2001; FSN	No. 15	at Oregon State	W 68–65 ^{OT}	19–6 (12–2)	Gill Coliseum (8,607); Corvallis, OR
March 01, 2001; FSN	No. 12	California	W 79–75	20–6 (13–2)	Pauley Pavilion (11,753); Los Angeles, CA
March 03, 2001	No. 12	No. 1 Stanford	L 79–85	20–7 (13–3)	Pauley Pavilion (12,523); Los Angeles, CA
March 08, 2001	No. 13	at Washington State	W 86–76	21–7 (14–3)	Beasley Coliseum (3,740); Pullman, WA
March 10, 2001; FSN	No. 13	at Washington	L 94–96	21–8 (14–4)	Hec Edmundson Pavilion (8,611); Seattle, WA
NCAA tournament
March 15, 2001; CBS	No. 15	vs. Hofstra; First Round	W 61–48	22–8	Greensboro Coliseum (14,235); Greensboro, NC
March 17, 2001; CBS	No. 15	vs. Utah State; Second Round	W 75–50	23–8	Greensboro Coliseum (20,943); Greensboro, NC
March 22, 2001; CBS	No. 15	vs. No. 1 Duke; Sweet Sixteen	L 63–76	23–9	First Union Center (20,270); Philadelphia, PA
*Non-conference game. ^{#}Rankings from AP Poll. (#) Tournament seedings in parentheses. All times are in Pacific Time.
