= Michael Wright (basketball) =

American-Turkish basketball player (1980–2015)

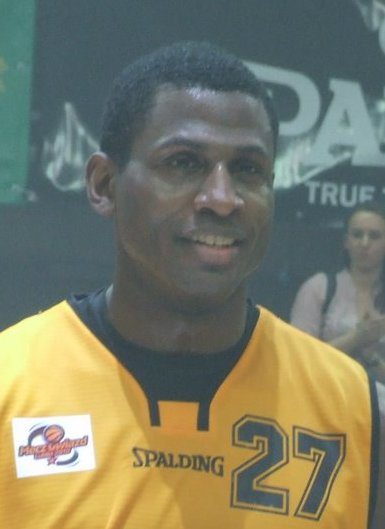
- Wright during the 2010 PLK All-Star game

Personal information
- Born: January 7, 1980 Chicago, Illinois, U.S.
- Died: November 10, 2015 (aged 35) Brooklyn, New York, U.S.
- Listed height: 6 ft 8 in (2.03 m)
- Listed weight: 238 lb (108 kg)

Career information
- High school: Farragut Academy (Chicago, Illinois)
- College: Arizona (1998–2001)
- NBA draft: 2001: 2nd round, 39th overall pick
- Drafted by: New York Knicks
- Playing career: 2001–2015
- Position: Power forward

Career history
- 2001–2002: Śląsk Wrocław
- 2002–2003: Granada
- 2003–2004: Hapoel Tel Aviv
- 2004–2005: Alba Berlin
- 2005–2006: Beşiktaş Cola Turka
- 2006: Jeonju KCC Egis
- 2006–2007: Pau Orthez
- 2007–2009: Turk Telekom
- 2009–2010: Turów Zgorzelec
- 2010–2011: Medical Park Trabzonspor
- 2011–2012: Turk Telekom
- 2012–2014: Mersin BB
- 2015: Cholet Basket

Career highlights
- Turkish Cup winner (2008); Turkish President's Cup winner (2008); 2× Turkish League Top Scorer (2011, 2013); 2× Turkish League All-Star (2006, 2009); French Cup winner (2007); French League All-Star (2007); Polish League champion (2002); Polish League Finals MVP (2002); Polish League Top Scorer (2010); Polish Basketball All-Star Game MVP (2010); FIBA Europe League All-Star Game MVP (2004); Third-team All-American – AP (2001); 2× First-team All-Pac-10 (2000, 2001); Pac-10 Freshman of the Year (1999)
- Stats at Basketball Reference
Medals
Men's basketball
Representing United States
FIBA Americas U18 Championship
Gold medal – first place	1998 Puerto Plata	Team competition
FIBA U19 World Cup
Silver medal – second place	1999 Lisbon	Team competition

Michael Wright (January 7, 1980 – November 10, 2015) was an American-Turkish professional basketball player. He also held Turkish citizenship, under the name Ali Karadeniz. He played professional basketball in Poland, Spain, Israel, South Korea, France, Germany, and Turkey. He was murdered in 2015.

== High school career ==
Wright played his high school basketball at Farragut Academy, where, as a freshman, he was part of one of the best teams in the country, which boasted future professionals Willie Farley and Ronnie Fields, as well as Minnesota Timberwolves superstar Kevin Garnett. At 2.03 m (6 ft 8 in), Wright played center after Garnett's departure, and moved to power forward in college.

== College career ==
At the University of Arizona, Wright started for the Wildcats in the 2001 NCAA Division I championship against the Duke Blue Devils. However, undersized for that position at the pro level, and too slow to be a small forward,he dropped to the second round of the 2001 NBA draft where he was drafted by the New York Knicks.

== Professional career ==
Wright was drafted as the 39th pick in the 2001 NBA draft by the New York Knicks. After not joining the Knicks or any other NBA team, Wright moved overseas and switched teams almost every season. He was one of only eight players selected in the 2001 NBA Draft who never played in a single NBA game.

Wright started with Polish league champions Śląsk Wrocław, that also participated in the Euroleague, moving to Spain's CB Granada the following year.

After the team was relegated to the LEB (Spain's second division), Wright moved to Israel and signed with Hapoel Tel Aviv. A year later he signed with ALBA Berlin.

In 2005, he moved to Beşiktaş Cola Turka of the Turkish Basketball League. He started the 2006–07 season in South Korea with Jeonju KCC Egis; in October signed with French and Euroleague's EB Pau Orthez.

In May 2007, he moved back to Turkey and signed for Türk Telekom B.K. In September 2009 he has signed a contract with Turów Zgorzelec from Poland for the 2009–10 season.

In July 2011, he returned to Türk Telekom B.K. for one season with an option for a second one. In the summer of 2012, he signed a contract with Mersin BB.

On February 3, 2015, he signed with Cholet Basket of the French LNB Pro A. After averaging 1.7 points and 2 rebounds in 3 contests, Wright and Cholet parted ways.

== Murder ==
On November 10, 2015, Wright was found dead in his car in Brooklyn, New York, covered in trash bags in the vehicle's back seat. The medical examiner determined that his death was a homicide. Two men were charged in his death.

According to a family member interviewed after his death, Wright intended to return to Europe to play another two seasons before retirement.

Two men were charged on November 1, 2016 – Mark A. Holdbrooks, 59, and alleged accomplice David Victor, 35, were charged with murder and other offenses after a yearlong investigation. Holdbrooks, Wright's longtime roommate, allegedly reported him missing on November 8, 2015. Bergen County Prosecutor Gurbir S. Grewal did not specify a motive or mention how Wright was killed but said he had suffered "head trauma." Later, authorities said Victor and Holdbrooks drugged Wright with gamma hydroxybutyrate (GHB), a date rape drug, and killed him with an axe in Closter, New Jersey, and that Victor then drove Wright's Lexus SUV to Brooklyn, leaving it with his body in it parked on East 16th Street near Avenue J in Midwood.

== See also ==
- List of basketball players who died during their careers
