= 2000–01 Washington State Cougars men's basketball team =

American college basketball season

2000–01 Washington State Cougars men's basketball
- Conference: Pacific-10 Conference
- Record: 12–16 (5–13 Pac-10)
- Head coach: Paul Graham (2nd season)
- Home arena: Beasley Coliseum

2000–01 Pacific-10 Conference men's basketball standings
	Conf.				Overall
Team	W		L	PCT	W		L	PCT
No. 5 Stanford	16	–	2	.889	31	–	3	.912
No. 2 Arizona	15	–	3	.833	28	–	8	.778
No. 12 UCLA	14	–	4	.778	23	–	9	.719
No. 14 USC	11	–	7	.611	24	–	10	.706
California	11	–	7	.611	20	–	11	.645
Oregon	5	–	13	.278	14	–	14	.500
Arizona State	5	–	13	.278	13	–	16	.448
Washington State	5	–	13	.278	12	–	16	.429
Oregon State	4	–	14	.222	10	–	20	.333
Washington	4	–	14	.222	10	–	20	.333
As of November 30, 2007; Rankings from Coaches Poll

The 2000–01 Washington State Cougars men's basketball team represented Washington State University for the 2000–01 NCAA Division I men's basketball season. Led by second-year head coach Paul Graham, the Cougars were members of the Pacific-10 Conference and played their home games on campus at Beasley Coliseum in Pullman, Washington.

The Cougars were 12–16 overall in the regular season and 5–13 in conference play, tied for sixth in the standings.

There was no conference tournament this season; last played in 1990, it resumed in 2002.
