= 2000–01 California Golden Bears men's basketball team =

American college basketball season

2000–01 California Golden Bears men's basketball

NCAA tournament, first round
- Conference: Pacific-10 Conference
- Record: 20–11 (11–7 Pac-10)
- Head coach: Ben Braun (5th season)
- Home arena: Harmon Gym

2000–01 Pacific-10 Conference men's basketball standings
	Conf.				Overall
Team	W		L	PCT	W		L	PCT
No. 5 Stanford	16	–	2	.889	31	–	3	.912
No. 2 Arizona	15	–	3	.833	28	–	8	.778
No. 12 UCLA	14	–	4	.778	23	–	9	.719
No. 14 USC	11	–	7	.611	24	–	10	.706
California	11	–	7	.611	20	–	11	.645
Oregon	5	–	13	.278	14	–	14	.500
Arizona State	5	–	13	.278	13	–	16	.448
Washington State	5	–	13	.278	12	–	16	.429
Oregon State	4	–	14	.222	10	–	20	.333
Washington	4	–	14	.222	10	–	20	.333
As of November 30, 2007; Rankings from Coaches Poll

The 2000–01 California Golden Bears men's basketball team represented the University of California, Berkeley during the 2000–01 season.

Led by head coach Ben Braun, the Bears finished the regular season with a 11–7 record in the Pac-10, placing them in fourth. They received an at-large bid to the NCAA tournament, where they fell to No. 9 seed Fresno State in the opening round. The team finished the season with an overall record of 20–11.

== Roster ==
2000–01 California Golden Bears men's basketball team
Players
Coaches

Pos.	#	Name	Height	Weight	Year	Hometown
G	15	Dennis Gates	6 ft 3 in (1.91 m)	195 lb (88 kg)	Jr	Country Club Hills, Illinois
G	25	Brian Wethers	6 ft 5 in (1.96 m)	210 lb (95 kg)	So	Murietta, California
F	34	Joe Shipp	6 ft 5 in (1.96 m)	220 lb (100 kg)	So	Los Angeles, California

Head coach

- Ben Braun

Assistant coach(es)

Legend

- (C) Team captain
- (S) Suspended
- (I) Ineligible
- (W) Walk-on
- Injured
- Current redshirt

== Schedule and results ==
Date time, TV	Rank^{#}	Opponent^{#}	Result	Record	Site city, state
Regular season
Nov 13, 2000*		Mississippi State	W 83–76 ^{OT}	1–0	Haas Pavilion; Berkeley, California
Nov 15, 2000*		at Texas	L 54–57	1–1	Frank Erwin Center; Austin, Texas
Nov 29, 2000*		at Saint Louis	L 66–88	1–2	Savvis Center; St. Louis, Missouri
Dec 2, 2000*		at UC Irvine	L 52–56	1–3	Bren Events Center; Irvine, California
Dec 5, 2000*		Cleveland State	W 62–54	2–3	Haas Pavilion; Berkeley, California
Dec 9, 2000*		Colorado	W 75–63	3–3	Haas Pavilion; Berkeley, California
Dec 11, 2000*		Albany	W 95–61	4–3	Haas Pavilion; Berkeley, California
Dec 21, 2000*		vs. Georgia; Pete Newell Challenge	W 85–64	5–3	SAP Center; San Jose, California
Dec 23, 2000*		Coppin State	W 75–59	6–3	Haas Pavilion; Berkeley, California
Dec 29, 2000*		Yale	W 76–62	7–3	Haas Pavilion; Berkeley, California
Dec 30, 2000*		La Salle	W 81–59	8–3	Haas Pavilion; Berkeley, California
Jan 4, 2001		at No. 16 Arizona	L 75–78	8–4 (0–1)	McKale Center; Tucson, Arizona
Jan 6, 2001		at Arizona State	W 82–67	9–4 (1–1)	Wells Fargo Arena; Tempe, Arizona
Jan 11, 2001		Oregon	W 78–62	10–4 (2–1)	Haas Pavilion; Berkeley, California
Jan 13, 2001		Oregon State	W 81–67	11–4 (3–1)	Haas Pavilion; Berkeley, California
Jan 17, 2001		at No. 1 Stanford	L 58–84	11–5 (3–2)	Maples Pavilion; Stanford, California
Jan 20, 2001*		South Florida	W 79–69	12–5	Haas Pavilion; Berkeley, California
Jan 25, 2001		at Washington State	W 75–71 ^{OT}	13–5 (4–2)	Beasley Coliseum; Pullman, Washington
Jan 27, 2001		at Washington	W 79–64	14–5 (5–2)	Bank of America Arena; Seattle, Washington
Feb 1, 2001		UCLA	W 92–63	15–5 (6–2)	Haas Pavilion; Berkeley, California
Feb 3, 2001		No. 21 USC	L 66–80	15–6 (6–3)	Haas Pavilion; Berkeley, California
Mar 10, 2001		No. 8 Arizona	L 76–78	20–10 (11–7)	Haas Pavilion; Berkeley, California
NCAA Tournament
Mar 16, 2001*	(8 S)	vs. (9 S) Fresno State; First round	L 70–82	20–11	Pyramid Arena; Memphis, Tennessee
*Non-conference game. ^{#}Rankings from AP Poll. (#) Tournament seedings in parentheses. S=South. All times are in Pacific.
