= Pac-12 Conference Men's Basketball Player of the Year =

Honor awarded to college basketball players

- Awarded for: the most outstanding basketball player in the Pac-12 Conference
- Country: United States

History
- First award: 1976
- Final award: Pac-12 to resume in 2026–27

The Pac-12 Conference Men's Basketball Player of the Year is a currently dormant award given to the Pac-12 Conference's most outstanding player. The award was first given following the 1975–76 season, when the conference was known as the Pacific-8, and was determined by voting from the Pac-12 media and coaches. On August 2, 2024, 10 of the 12 members departed from the conference. The Pac-12 continued to operate as a two-team conference through the 2025–26 academic year, sponsoring four sports – football, track & field, women's gymnastics and men's wrestling. On September 12, 2024, the Pac-12 announced the admission of four new universities effective July 2026: Boise State, Colorado State, Fresno State, and San Diego State. According to the press release, "Oregon State University and Washington State University are currently operating as members of the Pac-12 Conference as part of an NCAA two-year grace period and will continue to do so for the 2025–26 academic season before the four new members officially join. The collective six universities will collaboratively chart additional membership and other future conference considerations." Shortly after announcing the aforementioned four new members, the Pac-12 added two more new members, also effective in 2026–27—Gonzaga and Utah State. Several months later, Texas State was announced as a 2026 arrival. With nine confirmed members, conference play resumed in 2026–27, with the award again being presented.

Two players were honored multiple times: David Greenwood of UCLA and Sean Elliott of Arizona. Four freshmen also won the award: Shareef Abdur-Rahim of California, Kevin Love of UCLA, Deandre Ayton of Arizona and Evan Mobley of USC. Between the arrival of Arizona and Arizona State in 1978 and the entry of Colorado and Utah in 2011, the conference was known as the Pacific-10.

== Key ==
†	Co-Players of the Year
*	Awarded a national player of the year award that same season: Helms Foundation College Basketball Player of the Year (1904–05 to 1978–79); UPI College Basketball Player of the Year (1954–55 to 1995–96); Oscar Robertson Trophy (1958–59 to present); Naismith College Player of the Year (1968–69 to present); John R. Wooden Award (1976–77 to present)
Player (X)	Denotes the number of times the player has been awarded the Pac-12 Player of the Year award at that point

== Winners ==
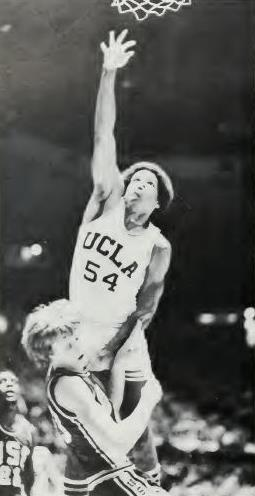
Marques Johnson, UCLA, 1977

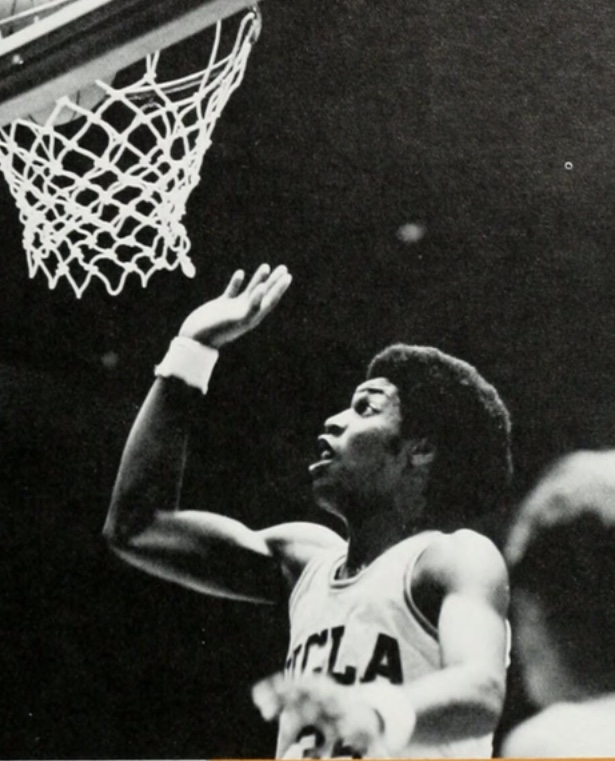
David Greenwood, UCLA, 1978 and 1979

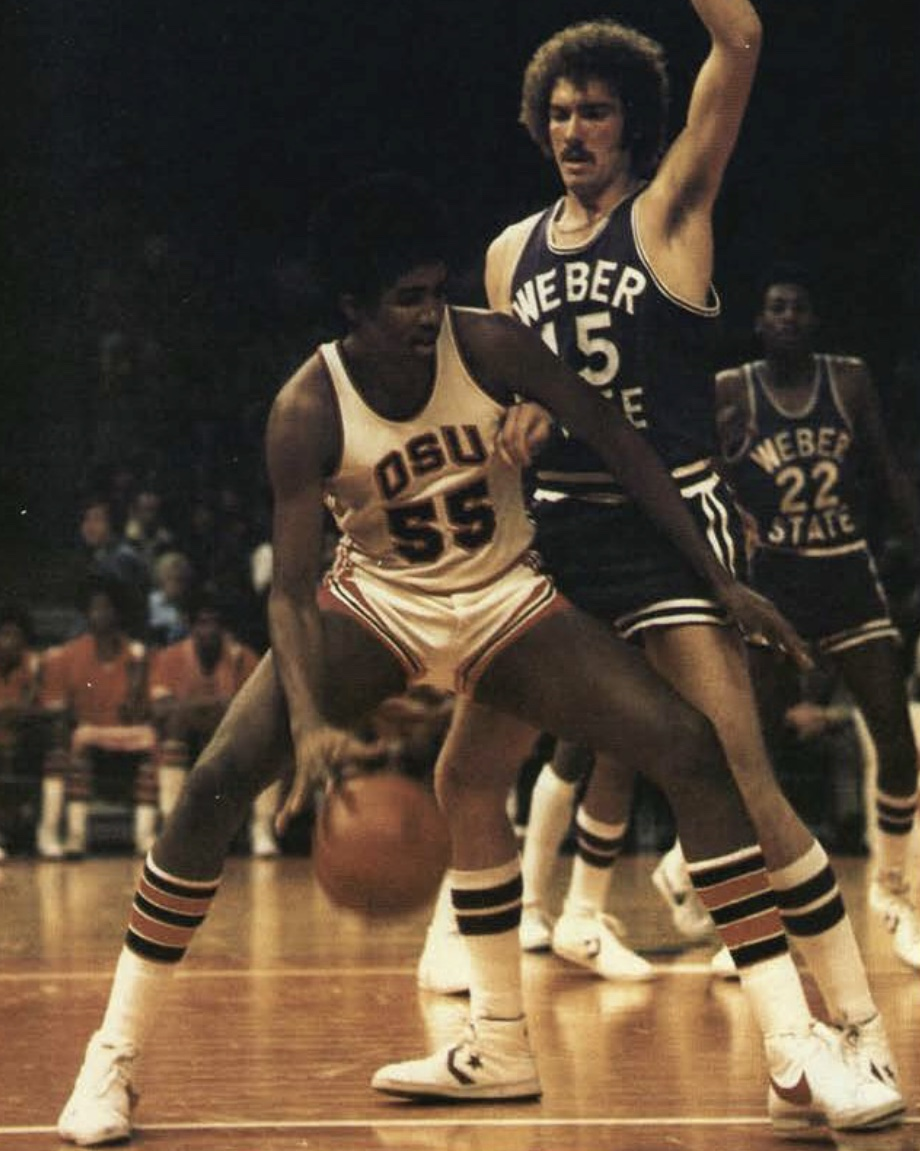
Steve Johnson, Oregon State, 1981

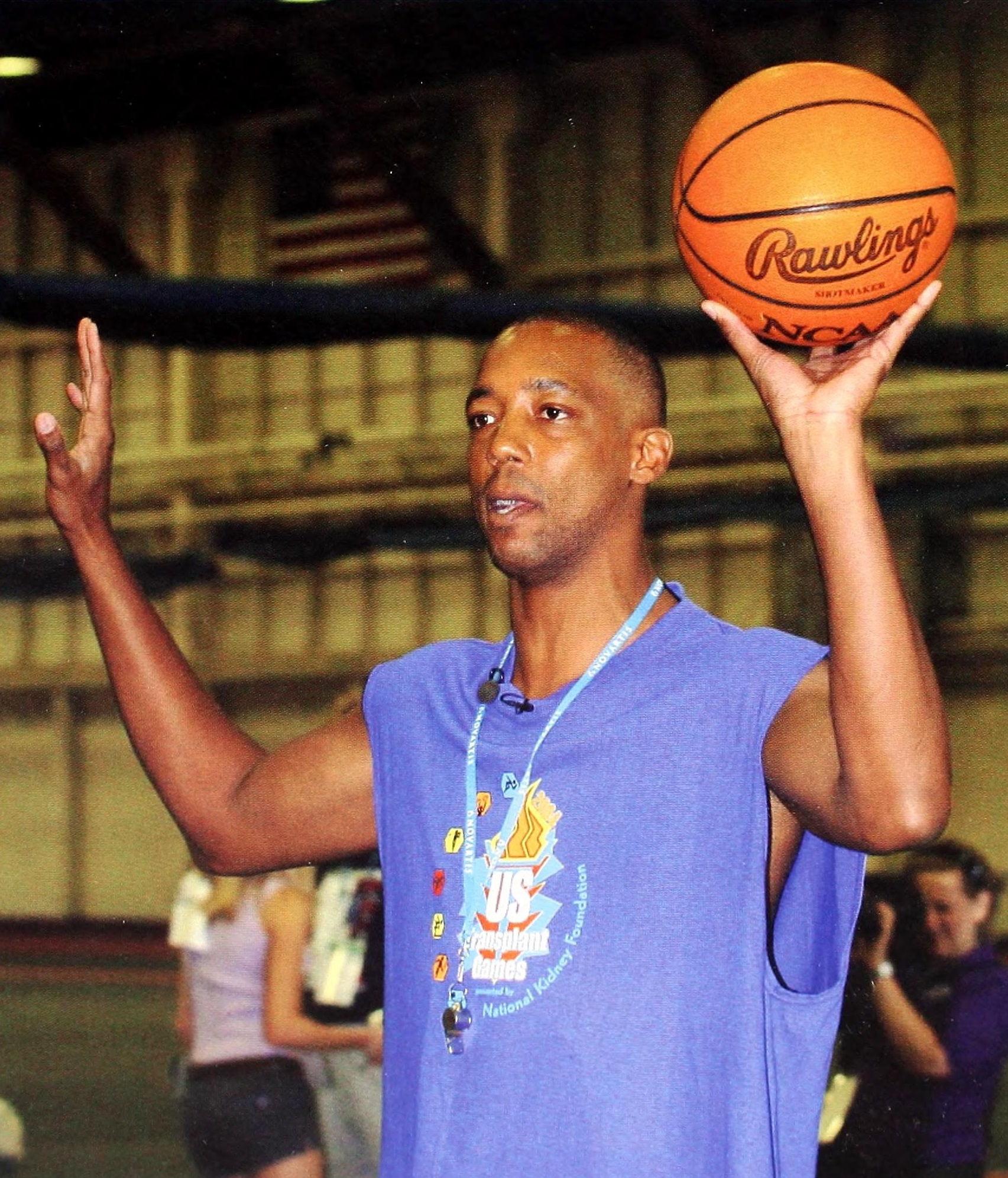
Sean Elliott, Arizona, 1988 and 1989

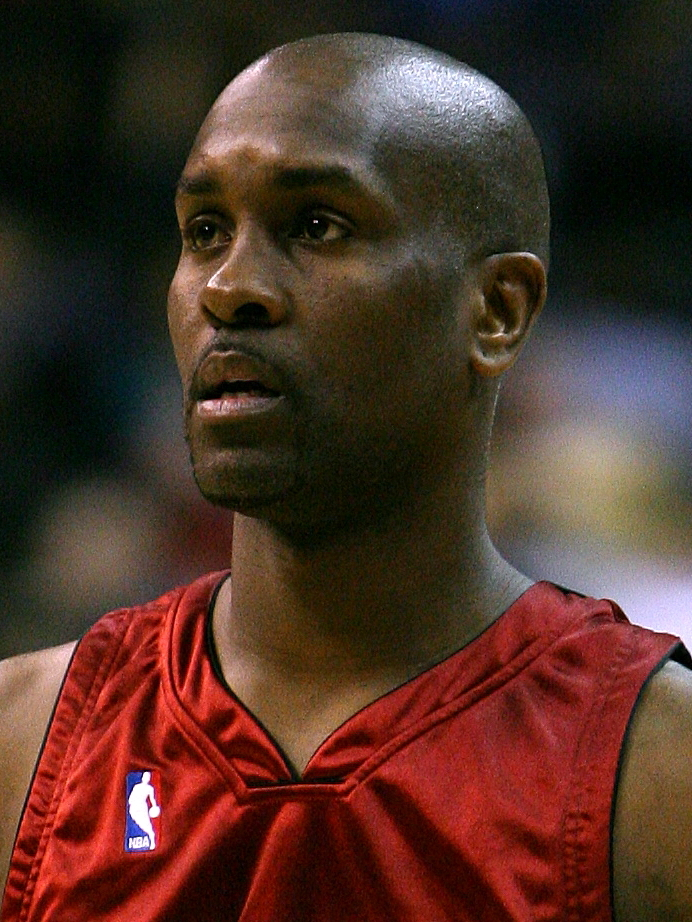
Gary Payton, Oregon State, 1990

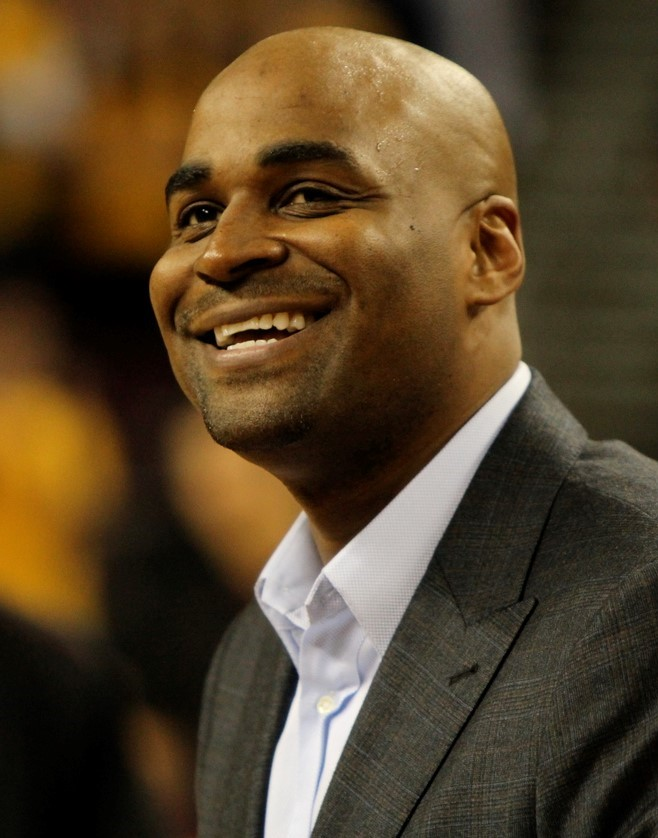
Harold Miner, USC, 1992

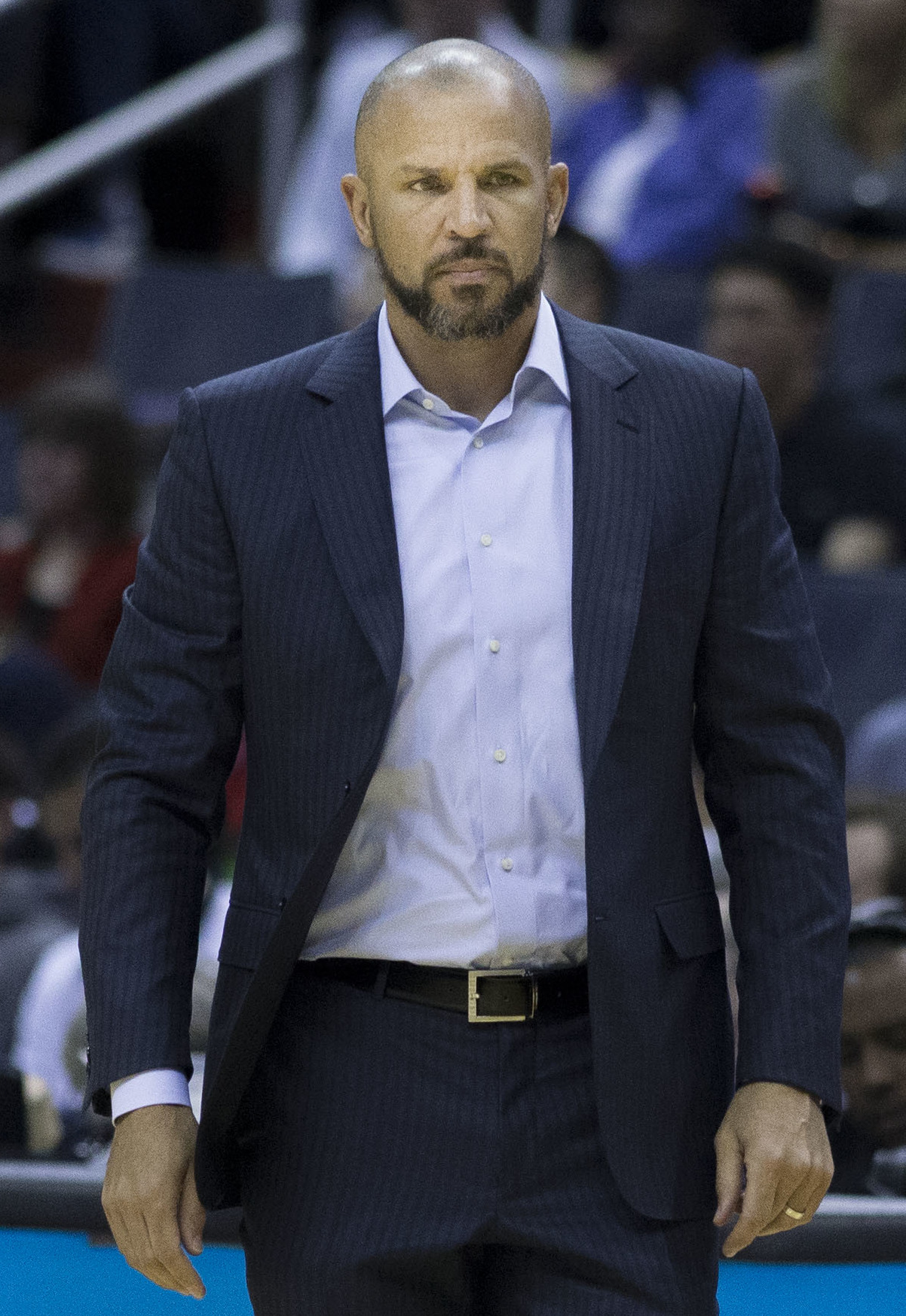
Jason Kidd, California, 1994

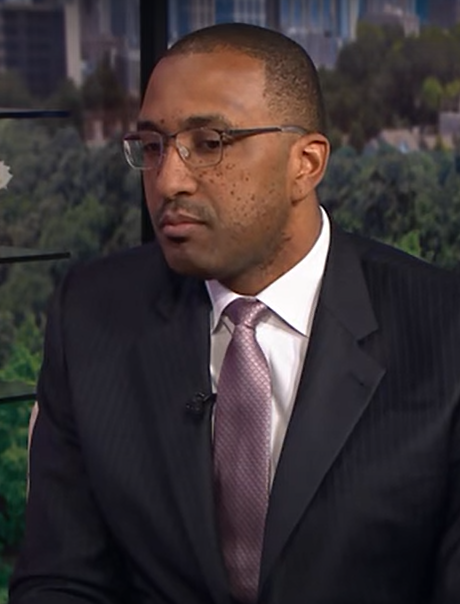
Shareef Abdur-Rahim, California, 1996

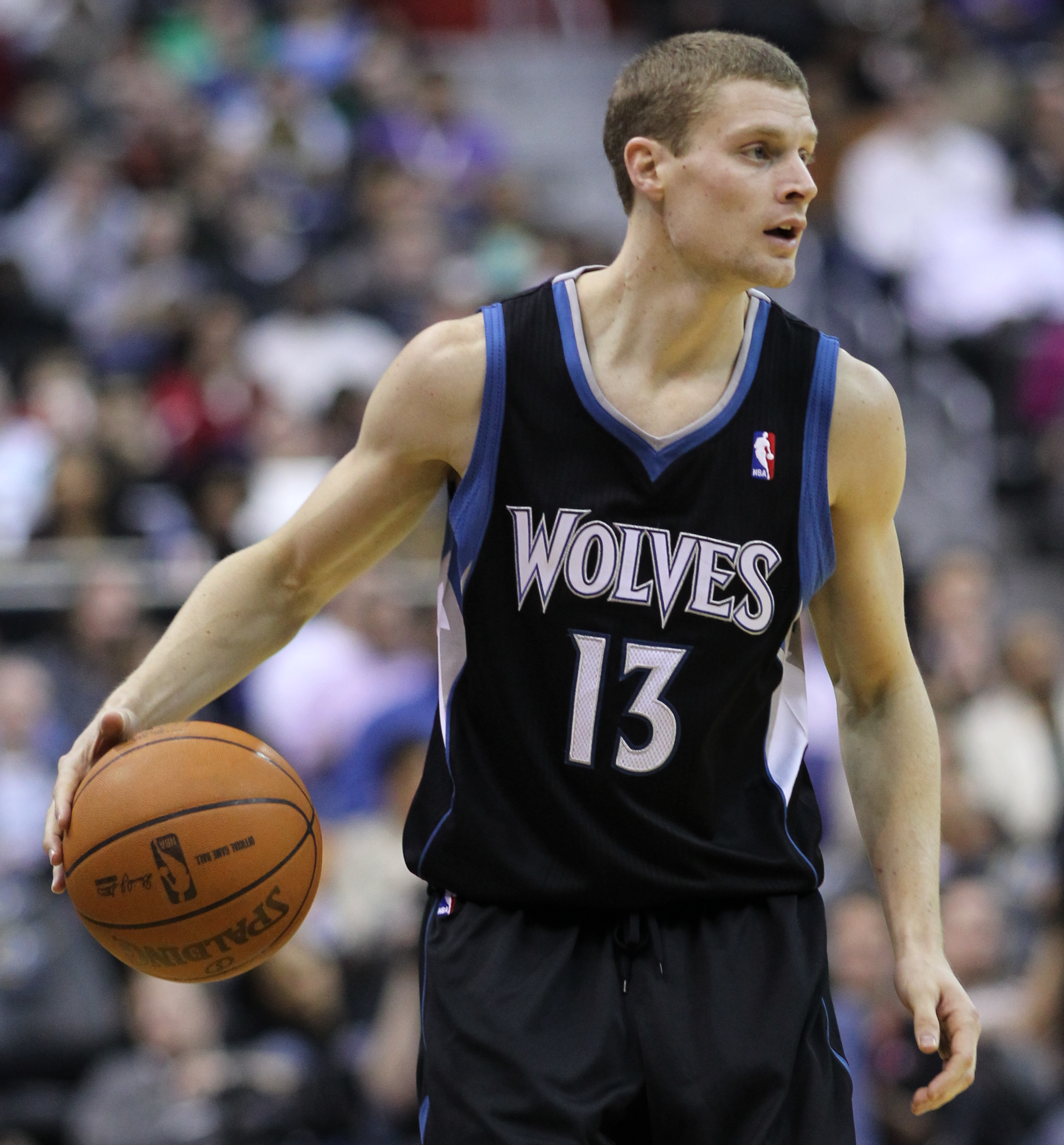
Luke Ridnour, Oregon, 2003

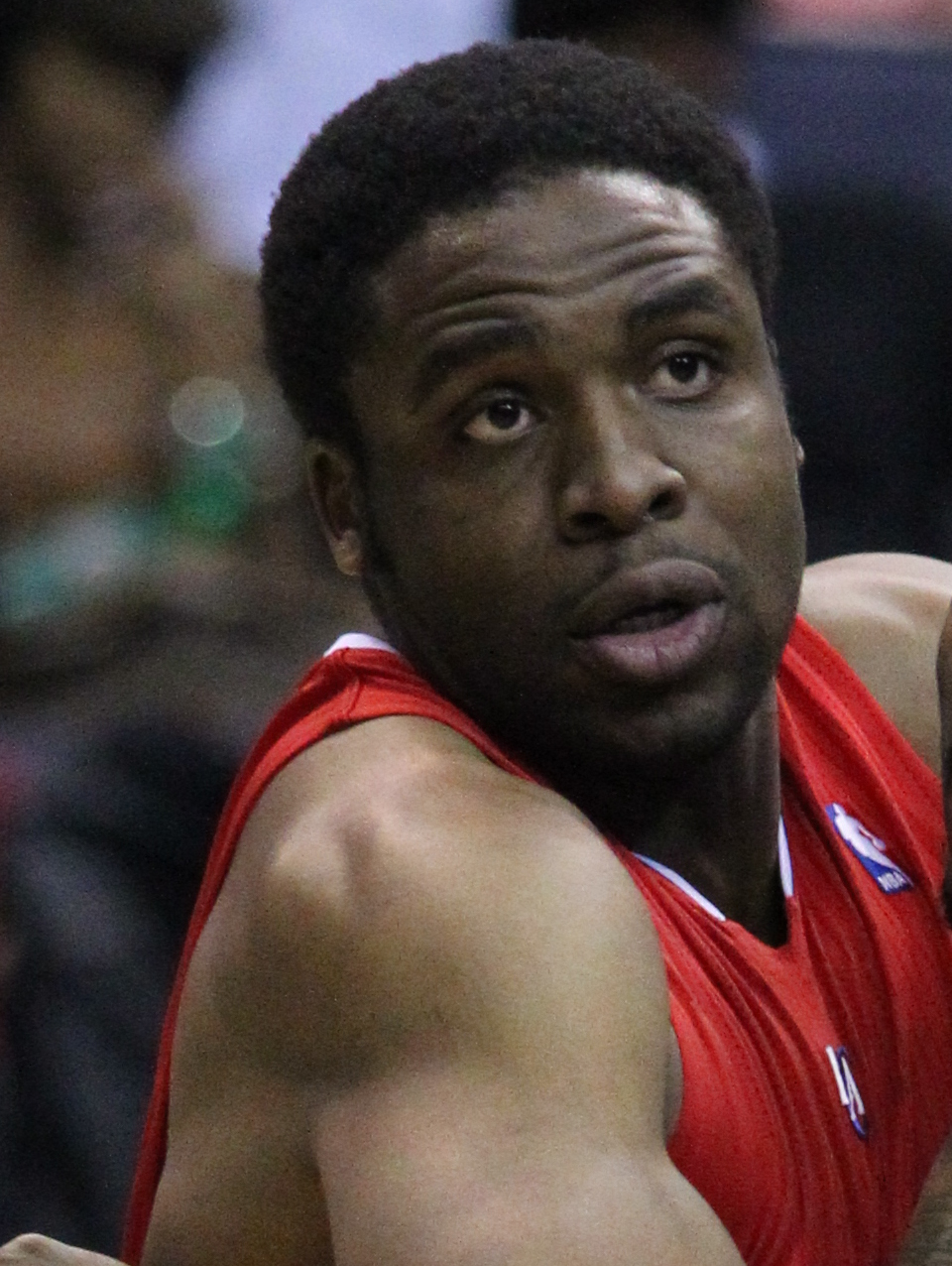
Ike Diogu, Arizona State, 2005

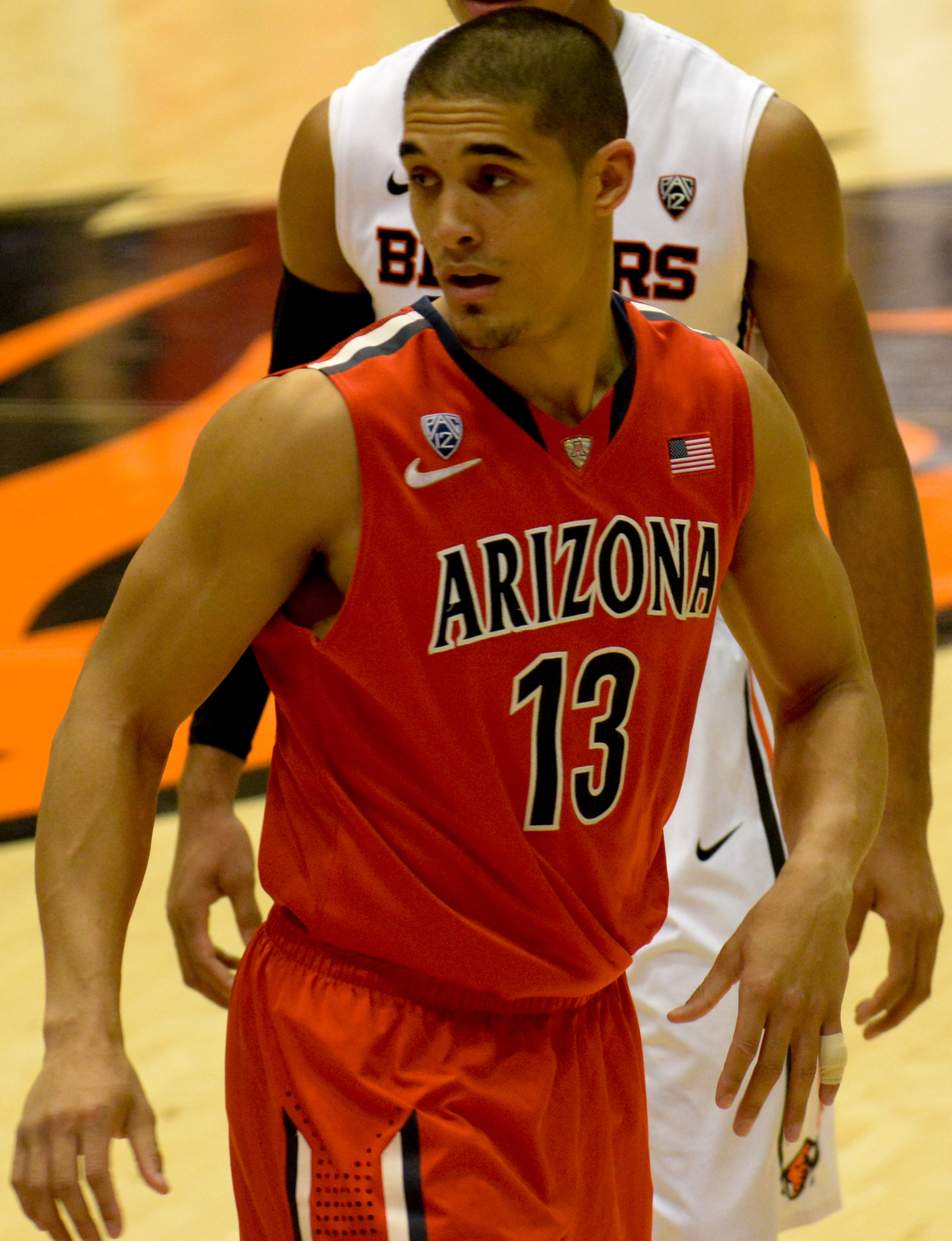
Nick Johnson, Arizona, 2014

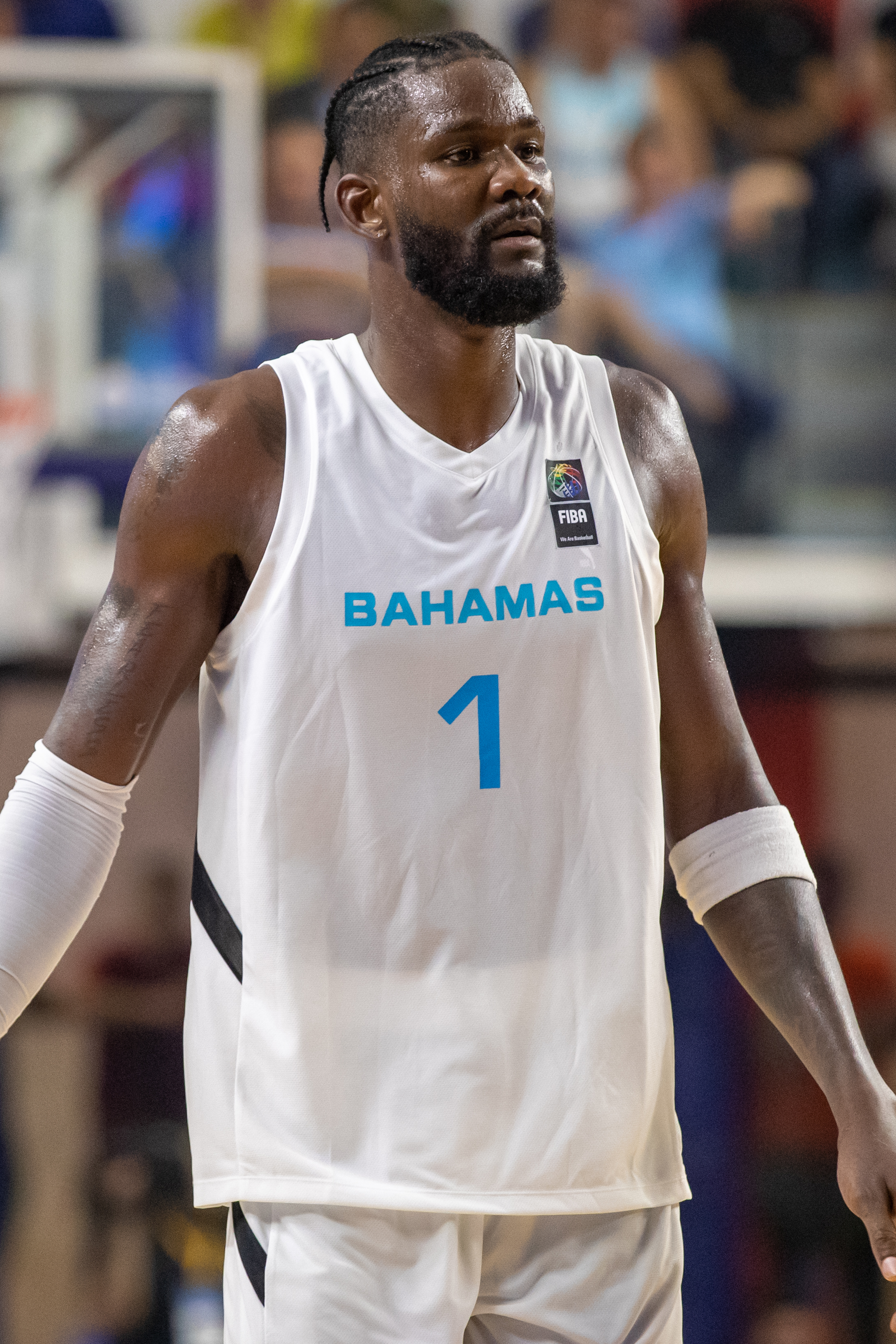
Deandre Ayton, Arizona, 2018

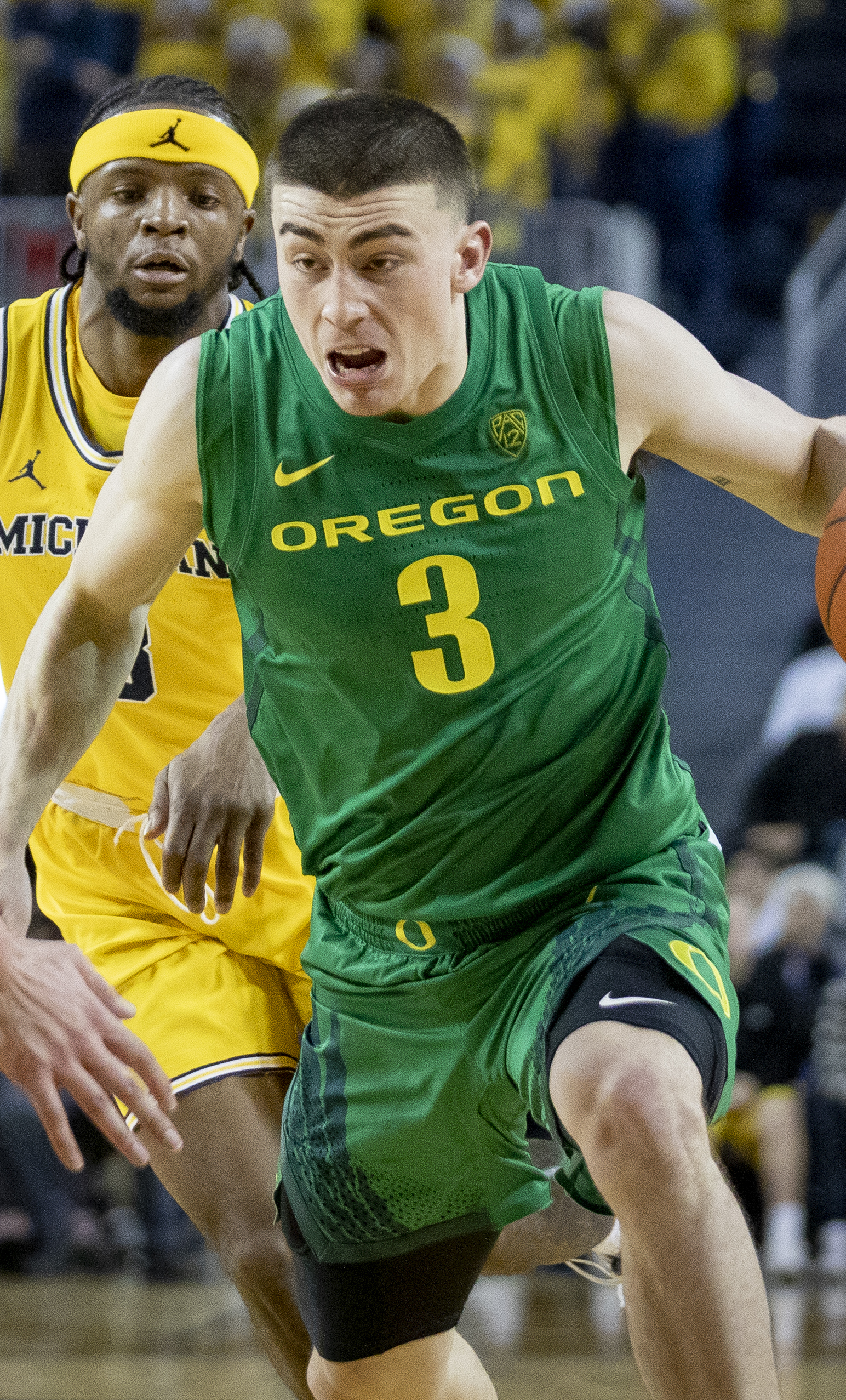
Payton Pritchard, Oregon, 2020

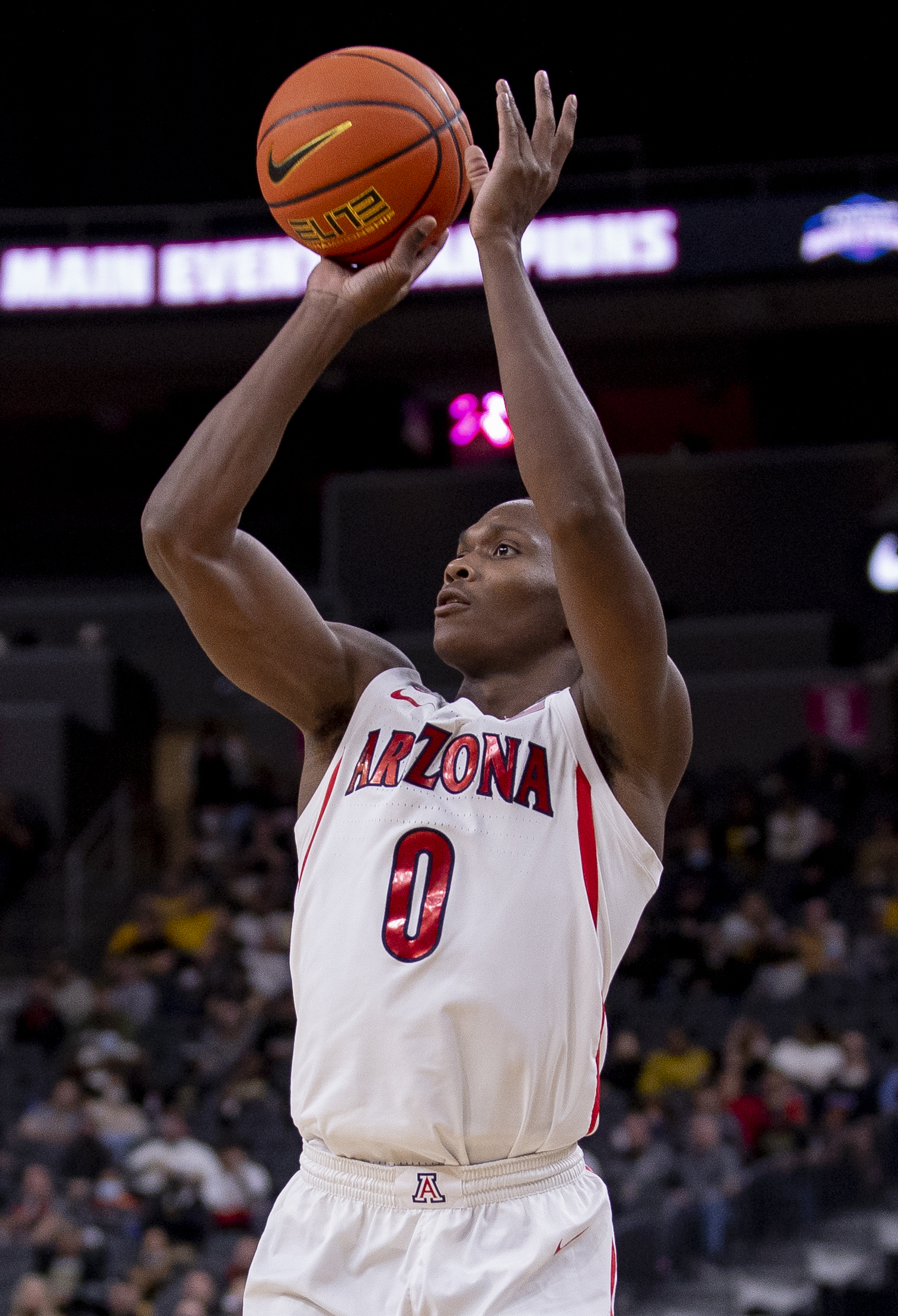
Bennedict Mathurin, Arizona, 2021

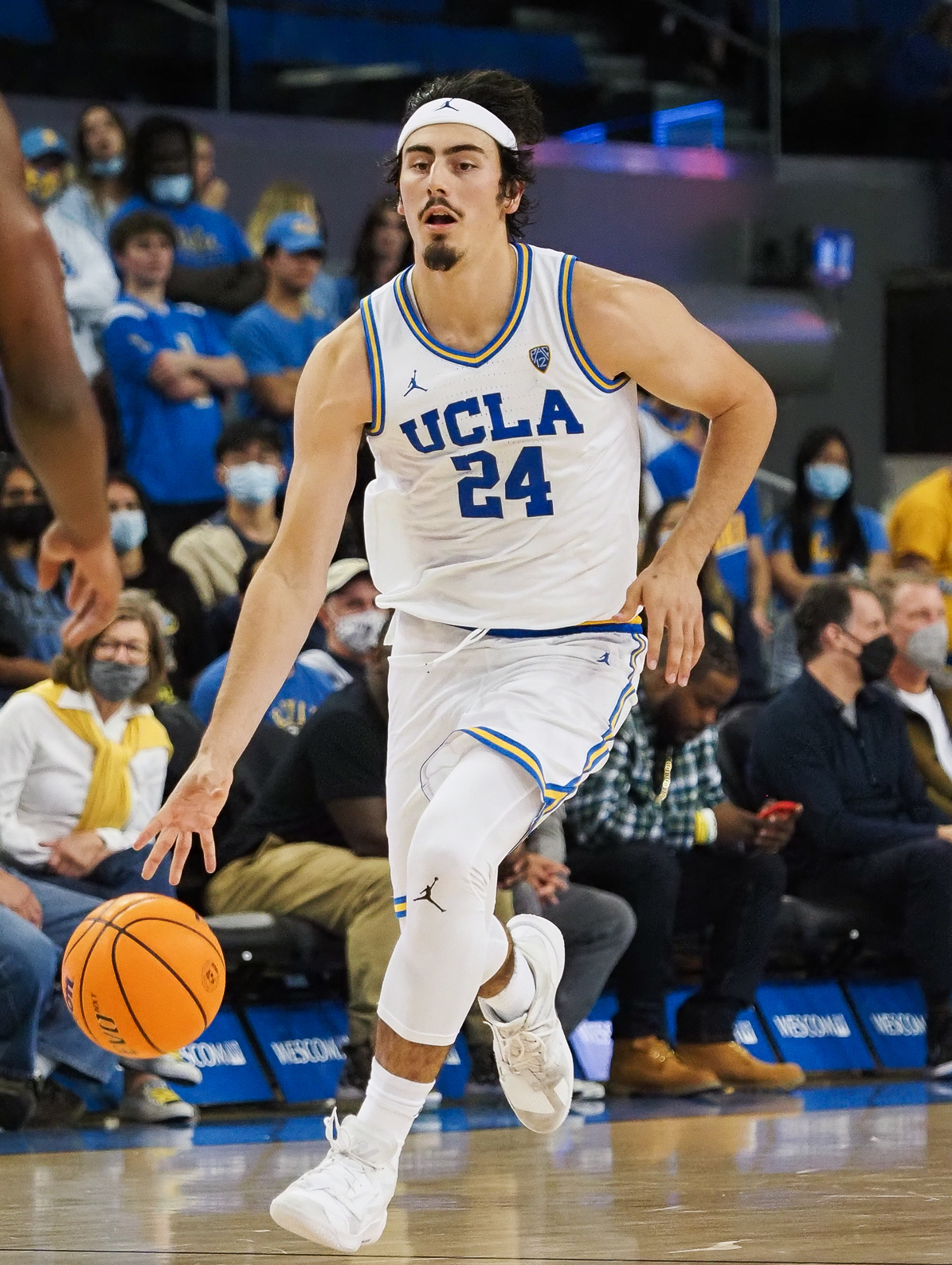
Jaime Jaquez Jr., UCLA, 2023

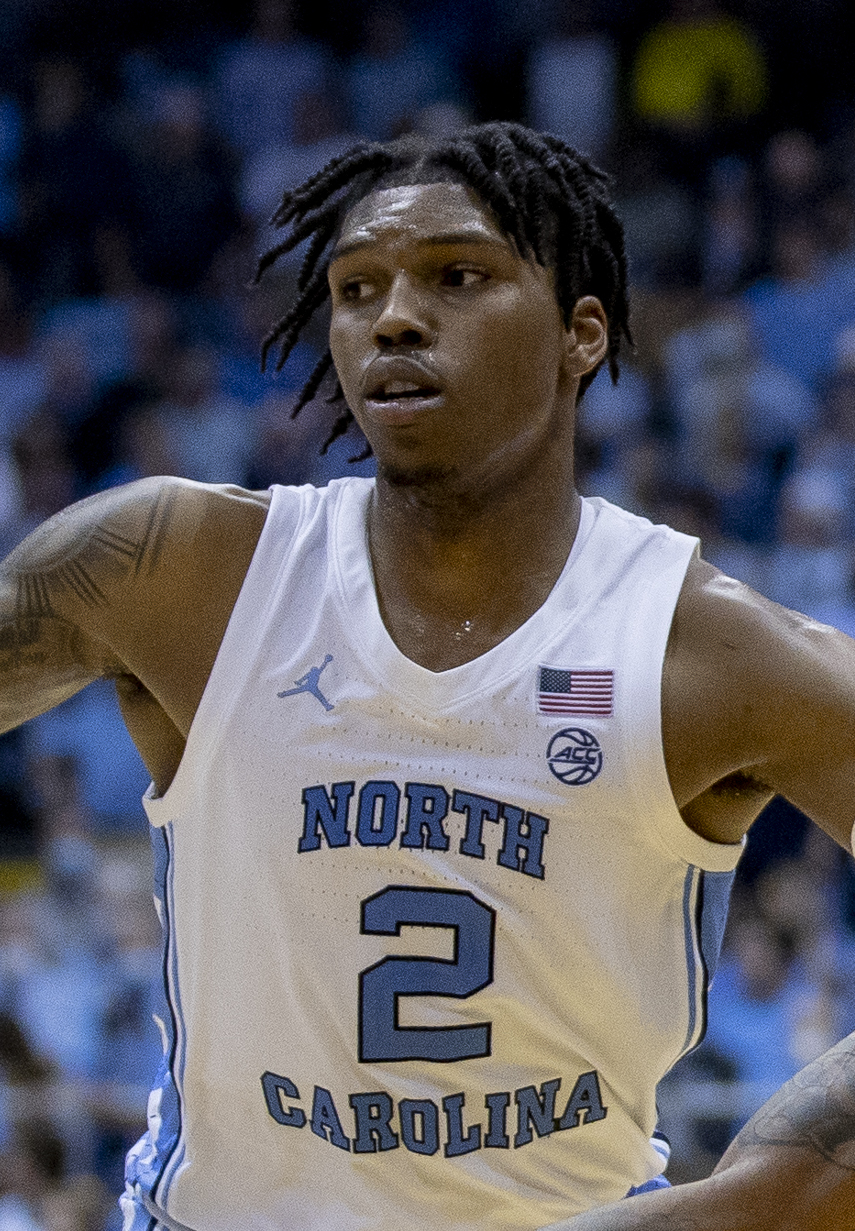
Caleb Love, Arizona, 2024

Season	Player	School	Position	Class	Reference
1975–76	Ron Lee	Oregon	PG / SG	Senior	
1976–77	Marques Johnson*	UCLA	PF	Senior	
1977–78	David Greenwood	UCLA	PF	Junior	
1978–79	David Greenwood (2)	UCLA	PF	Senior	
1979–80	Don Collins	Washington State	SF	Senior	
1980–81	Steve Johnson	Oregon State	C	Senior	
1981–82	Lester Conner	Oregon State	PG	Senior	
1982–83	Kenny Fields	UCLA	SF	Junior	
1983–84	A.C. Green	Oregon State	PF	Junior	
1984–85	Wayne Carlander	USC	PF	Senior	
1985–86	Christian Welp	Washington	C	Junior	
1986–87	José Ortiz	Oregon State	C	Senior	
1987–88	Sean Elliott	Arizona	SF	Junior	
1988–89	Sean Elliott* (2)	Arizona	SF	Senior	
1989–90	Gary Payton	Oregon State	PG	Senior	
1990–91	Terrell Brandon	Oregon	PG	Junior	
1991–92	Harold Miner	USC	SG	Junior	
1992–93	Chris Mills	Arizona	SF	Senior	
1993–94	Jason Kidd	California	PG	Sophomore	
1994–95^{†}	Ed O'Bannon*	UCLA	SF	Senior	
1994–95^{†}	Damon Stoudamire	Arizona	PG	Senior	
1995–96	Shareef Abdur-Rahim	California	PF	Freshman	
1996–97	Ed Gray	California	SG	Senior	
1997–98	Mike Bibby	Arizona	PG	Sophomore	
1998–99	Jason Terry	Arizona	PG	Senior	
1999–00	Eddie House	Arizona State	SG	Senior	
2000–01	Sean Lampley	California	PF	Senior	
2001–02	Sam Clancy	USC	PF	Senior	
2002–03	Luke Ridnour	Oregon	PG	Junior	
2003–04	Josh Childress	Stanford	SG / SF	Junior	
2004–05	Ike Diogu	Arizona State	PF / C	Junior	
2005–06	Brandon Roy	Washington	SG	Senior	
2006–07	Arron Afflalo	UCLA	SG	Junior	
2007–08	Kevin Love	UCLA	PF	Freshman	
2008–09	James Harden	Arizona State	SG	Sophomore	
2009–10	Jerome Randle	California	PG	Senior	
2010–11	Derrick Williams	Arizona	SF / PF	Sophomore	
2011–12	Jorge Gutiérrez	California	PG	Senior	
2012–13	Allen Crabbe	California	SG	Junior	
2013–14	Nick Johnson	Arizona	PG / SG	Junior	
2014–15	Joe Young	Oregon	PG	Senior	
2015–16	Jakob Pöltl	Utah	C	Sophomore	
2016–17	Dillon Brooks	Oregon	SF	Junior	
2017–18	Deandre Ayton	Arizona	PF	Freshman	
2018–19	Jaylen Nowell	Washington	SG	Sophomore	
2019–20	Payton Pritchard	Oregon	PG	Senior	
2020–21	Evan Mobley	USC	F	Freshman	
2021–22	Bennedict Mathurin	Arizona	SG / SF	Sophomore	
2022–23	Jaime Jaquez Jr.	UCLA	SG / SF	Senior	
2023–24	Caleb Love	Arizona	SG	Senior	
2024–25	Pac-12 basketball was on hiatus due to significant conference realignments				
2025–26	Pac-12 basketball was on hiatus due to significant conference realignments				

== Winners by school ==
Current conference members in bold.

School (years in conference)^{a}	Winners	Years
Arizona (1978–2024)	11	1988, 1989, 1993, 1995^{†}, 1998, 1999, 2011, 2014, 2018, 2022, 2024
UCLA (1959–2024)	8	1977, 1978, 1979, 1983, 1995^{†}, 2007, 2008, 2023
California (1959–2024)	7	1994, 1996, 1997, 2001, 2010, 2012, 2013
Oregon (1964–2024)	6	1976, 1991, 2003, 2015, 2017, 2020
**Oregon State** (1964–present)	5	1981, 1982, 1984, 1987, 1990
USC (1959–2024)	4	1985, 1992, 2002, 2021
Arizona State (1978–2024)	3	2000, 2005, 2009
Washington (1959–2024)	3	1986, 2006, 2019
Stanford (1959–2024)	1	2004
Utah (2011–2024)	1	2016
**Washington State** (1962–present)	1	1980
**Boise State** (2026–present)	0	—
Colorado (2011–2024)	0	—
**Colorado State** (2026–present)	0	—
**Fresno State** (2026–present)	0	—
**Gonzaga** (2026–present)	0	—
**San Diego State** (2026–present)	0	—
**Texas State** (2026–present)	0	—
**Utah State** (2026–present)	0	—

- **^{a}** For purposes of this table, the "year joined" reflects the year that each team joined the conference now known as the Pac-12 as presently chartered. Although the Pac-12 claims the Pacific Coast Conference (PCC), founded in 1915, as part of its own history, that conference disbanded in 1959 due to infighting and scandal. That same year, four PCC members established the Athletic Association of Western Universities (AAWU) under a new charter that functions to this day, with a fifth joining before AAWU competition started. The player of the year award was not established until 1976, by which time all of the final members of the PCC except for Idaho were reunited in what was then the Pac-8.

== See also ==
- List of All-Pac-12 Conference men's basketball teams
