= Jarron Collins =

American basketball player (born 1978)

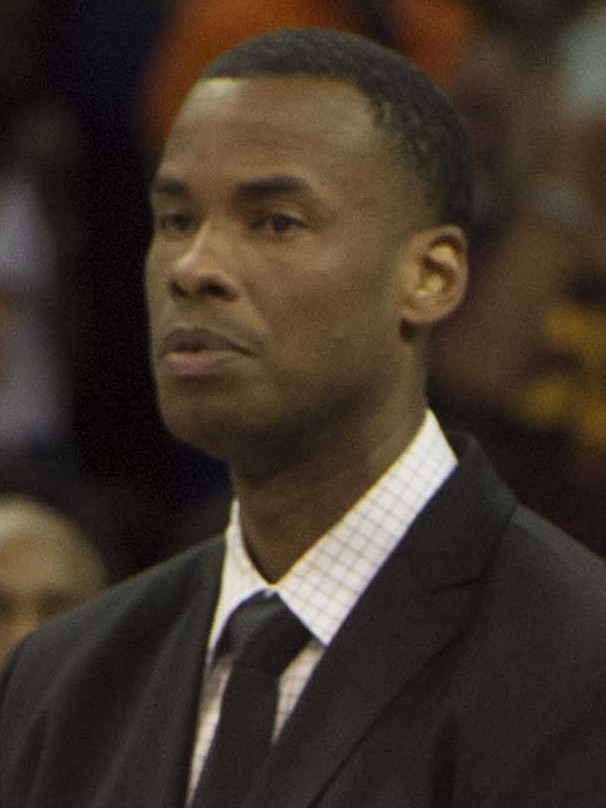
- Collins in 2016

Personal information
- Born: December 2, 1978 (age 47) Northridge, California, U.S.
- Listed height: 6 ft 11 in (2.11 m)
- Listed weight: 249 lb (113 kg)

Career information
- High school: Harvard-Westlake (Los Angeles, California)
- College: Stanford (1997–2001)
- NBA draft: 2001: 2nd round, 52nd overall pick
- Drafted by: Utah Jazz
- Playing career: 2001–2011
- Position: Center
- Number: 31, 20
- Coaching career: 2014–present

Career history

Playing
- 2001–2009: Utah Jazz
- 2009–2010: Phoenix Suns
- 2011: Los Angeles Clippers
- 2011: Portland Trail Blazers

Coaching
- 2014–2021: Golden State Warriors (assistant)
- 2021–2026: New Orleans Pelicans (assistant)

Career highlights
- As player: First-team All-Pac-10 (2001); Fourth-team Parade All-American (1997); McDonald's All-American (1997); As assistant coach: 3× NBA champion (2015, 2017, 2018)

Career NBA statistics
- Points: 2,095 (3.9 ppg)
- Rebounds: 1,579 (2.9 rpg)
- Blocks: 98 (0.2 bpg)
- Stats at NBA.com
- Stats at Basketball Reference

Jarron Thomas Collins (born December 2, 1978) is an American professional basketball coach and former player in the National Basketball Association (NBA). He was selected in the second round of the 2001 NBA draft by the Utah Jazz, and played 10 seasons in the NBA. His twin brother, Jason, also played in the league.

== Early life ==
Jarron Collins was born in Northridge, California. He and his twin brother Jason, who also became an NBA player, graduated from Harvard-Westlake School in Los Angeles, California. Also on the team was actor Jason Segel, who starred in a slam dunk contest after Collins deferred to allow his teammate to participate.

Collins shot 72 percent from the floor and averaged 13.8 points and 9.2 rebounds during his senior year in high school.

== College career ==
Collins attended Stanford University, where he was a two-time All-American and finished his Stanford career in the top ten all time in four career categories: rebounds, blocked shots, field-goal percentage and games played.

He was also recruited by UCLA, where he, his brother, and Earl Watson were the guests at the recruiting dinner that led to the firing of Jim Harrick at UCLA.

== NBA career ==
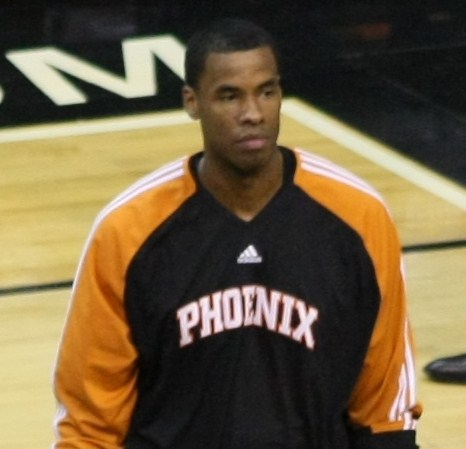
Collins with the Phoenix Suns in 2009

Collins was selected by the Utah Jazz in the second round of the 2001 NBA draft and played eight seasons with the Jazz until becoming a free agent following the 2009 season.

Collins spent the 2009 NBA preseason with the Portland Trail Blazers. He was waived by Portland, but then claimed off waivers by the Phoenix Suns.

Collins later joined the Los Angeles Clippers, signing a 10-day contract on January 7, 2011. He renewed his tenure, later signing another 10-day contract on January 17, 2011. On March 1, 2011, he signed a 10-day contract with the Portland Trail Blazers, and was released after finishing a second ten-day contract. That second 10-day contract ended up being Collins' final days in the NBA, as his final game was on March 17, 2011, in a 111 - 70 win over the Cleveland Cavaliers. In his final game, Collins played for 4 minutes and recorded no stats.

He retired from basketball after the season.

== Post-playing career ==
In 2013, he was working for the Los Angeles Clippers as a scout.

He later worked as a college basketball analyst for Pac-12 Networks.

On July 3, 2014, Collins joined Steve Kerr's staff as a player development coach for the Golden State Warriors. Collins won his first championship when the Warriors defeated the Cleveland Cavaliers in the 2015 NBA Finals.

On July 29, 2015, he was promoted to assistant coach by the Warriors.

Collins won his second championship in three years when the Warriors defeated the Cleveland Cavaliers in the 2017 NBA Finals.

Collins won his third championship in four years when the Warriors defeated the Cleveland Cavaliers in the 2018 NBA Finals.

In June 2021, Collins and the Warriors mutually agreed to part ways.

On August 4, 2021, Collins was hired as assistant coach by the New Orleans Pelicans.

== NBA career statistics ==
Legend
GP	Games played	GS	Games started	MPG	Minutes per game
FG%	Field goal percentage	3P%	3-point field goal percentage	FT%	Free throw percentage
RPG	Rebounds per game	APG	Assists per game	SPG	Steals per game
BPG	Blocks per game	PPG	Points per game	**Bold**	Career high
*	Led the league

=== Regular season ===
Year	Team	GP	GS	MPG	FG%	3P%	FT%	RPG	APG	SPG	BPG	PPG
2001–02	Utah	70	**68**	20.6	.461	.000	**.740**	**4.2**	.8	.4	**.3**	**6.4**
2002–03	Utah	22	7	19.1	.442	.000	.710	2.7	.6	.2	**.3**	5.5
2003–04	Utah	81	31	21.4	**.498**	.000	.718	3.9	1.0	.3	.2	6.0
2004–05	Utah	50	38	19.2	.414	.000	.697	3.3	**1.2**	.2	.1	4.3
2005–06	Utah	79	41	**21.9**	.461	—	.717	**4.2**	**1.2**	**.5**	**.3**	5.3
2006–07	Utah	**82***	9	11.1	.441	—	.651	2.1	.7	.2	.1	2.5
2007–08	Utah	70	9	10.0	.439	.000	.622	1.7	.5	.1	.1	1.7
2008–09	Utah	26	3	7.7	.457	—	.727	1.4	.3	.1	.0	1.5
2009–10	Phoenix	34	10	7.7	.387	—	.400	1.8	.2	.1	.1	1.0
2010–11	L.A. Clippers	23	0	6.8	.333	—	.700	.7	.0	.2	.0	.7
2010–11	Portland	5	0	4.8	.167	—	—	1.4	.2	.0	.0	.4
Career		542	216	15.8	.455	.000	.699	2.9	.8	.3	.2	3.9

=== Playoffs ===
Year	Team	GP	GS	MPG	FG%	3P%	FT%	RPG	APG	SPG	BPG	PPG
2002	Utah	4	4	**11.8**	**.556**	—	**1.000**	1.8	.0	.0	.0	**5.5**
2007	Utah	**13**	0	8.5	.333	—	.529	1.5	**.4**	**.3**	.0	1.2
2008	Utah	5	0	4.0	.000	—	—	1.2	.2	.2	**.2**	.0
2009	Utah	3	3	11.7	.200	—	.750	**3.3**	.3	**.3**	.0	2.7
2010	Phoenix	11	**10**	10.5	.333	—	**1.000**	1.5	.0	.1	.1	1.1
Career		35	17	9.3	.380	—	.655	1.7	.2	.2	.1	1.6
