= Eastern Illinois Panthers men's basketball statistical leaders =

The Eastern Illinois Panthers men's basketball statistical leaders are individual statistical leaders of the Eastern Illinois Panthers men's basketball program in various categories, including points, rebounds, assists, steals, and blocks. Within those areas, the lists identify single-game, single-season, and career leaders. The Panthers represent Eastern Illinois University in the NCAA's Ohio Valley Conference.

Eastern Illinois began competing in intercollegiate basketball in 1908. However, the school's record book does not generally list records from before the 1950s, as records from before this period are often incomplete and inconsistent. Since scoring was much lower in this era, and teams played much fewer games during a typical season, it is likely that few or no players from this era would appear on these lists anyway.

The NCAA did not officially record assists as a stat until the 1983–84 season, and blocks and steals until the 1985–86 season, but Eastern Illinois' record books includes players in these stats before these seasons. These lists are updated through the end of the 2021–22 season.

== Scoring ==
Career
| Rk | Player | Points | Seasons |
|---|---|---|---|
| 1 | Henry Domercant | 2,602 | 1999–00 2000–01 2001–02 2002–03 |
| 2 | Jay Taylor | 1,926 | 1985–86 1986–87 1987–88 1988–89 |
| 3 | Kyle Hill | 1,819 | 1997–98 1998–99 1999–00 2000–01 |
| 4 | Jon Collins | 1,702 | 1982–83 1983–84 1984–85 1985–86 |
| 5 | John Milholland | 1,655 | 1955–56 1956–57 1957–58 |
| 6 | Kevin Duckworth | 1,569 | 1982–83 1983–84 1984–85 1985–86 |
| 7 | Tom Katsimpalis | 1,536 | 1948–49 1949–50 1950–51 1951–52 |
| 8 | Charlie Thomas | 1,452 | 1974–75 1975–76 1976–77 1977–78 |
| 9 | John Wilson | 1,433 | 1947–48 1948–49 1949–50 1950–51 |
| 10 | Craig DeWitt | 1,426 | 1976–77 1977–78 1978–79 1979–80 |

Season
| Rk | Player | Points | Season |
|---|---|---|---|
| 1 | Henry Domercant | 817 | 2001–02 |
| 2 | Henry Domercant | 810 | 2002–03 |
| 3 | Jay Taylor | 748 | 1988–89 |
| 4 | Kyle Hill | 737 | 2000–01 |
| 5 | Henry Domercant | 706 | 2000–01 |

Single game
| Rk | Player | Points | Season | Opponent |
|---|---|---|---|---|
| 1 | B.J. Smith | 56 | 1958–59 | Millikin |
| 2 | Jay Taylor | 47 | 1988–89 | Chicago State |
| 3 | Henry Domercant | 46 | 2002–03 | Tennessee Tech |
| | Larry Miller | 46 | 1965–66 | Lewis |
| 5 | Jim Ficek | 45 | 1963–64 | McKendree |
| 6 | Jay Taylor | 41 | 1988–89 | Illinois-Chicago |
| 7 | Josh Gomes | 40 | 2003–04 | UT Martin |
| | Henry Domercant | 40 | 2002–03 | Eastern Kentucky |
| | Henry Domercant | 40 | 2002–03 | Evansville |
| | Henry Domercant | 40 | 2001–02 | Loyola-Chicago |
| | Kyle Hill | 40 | 2000–01 | Morehead State |
| | John Milholland | 40 | 1955–56 | Illinois State |

== Rebounds ==
Career
| Rk | Player | Rebounds | Seasons |
|---|---|---|---|
| 1 | Kevin Duckworth | 867 | 1982–83 1983–84 1984–85 1985–86 |
| 2 | Bob Rickett | 828 | 1961–62 1962–63 1963–64 1964–65 |
| 3 | Henry Domercant | 798 | 1999–00 2000–01 2001–02 2002–03 |
| 4 | Ousmane Cisse | 786 | 2006–07 2007–08 2008–09 2009–10 |
| 5 | Barry Johnson | 737 | 1988–89 1989–90 1990–91 1991–92 |
| 6 | Jeff Furry | 730 | 1972–73 1973–74 1974–75 1975–76 |
| 7 | Rob Pinnell | 709 | 1971–72 1972–73 1973–74 1974–75 |
| 8 | Craig DeWitt | 684 | 1976–77 1977–78 1978–79 1979–80 |
| 9 | Scott Keeve | 677 | 1970–71 1971–72 1972–73 |
| 10 | Bob Gosnell | 653 | 1953–54 1954–55 1955–56 |

Season
| Rk | Player | Rebounds | Season |
|---|---|---|---|
| 1 | Lloyd Ludwig | 327 | 1956–57 |
| 2 | Jim Kitchen | 314 | 1969–70 |
| 3 | Bob Gosnell | 311 | 1955–56 |
| 4 | Bob Rickett | 300 | 1964–65 |
| 5 | Charlie Sessions | 294 | 1955–56 |
| 6 | Kevin Duckworth | 290 | 1985–86 |
| 7 | Bill Carson | 282 | 1967–68 |
| 8 | George Dixon | 281 | 2019–20 |
| 9 | Bob Rickett | 277 | 1963–64 |
| | Kooper Jacobi | 277 | 2024–25 |

Single game
| Rk | Player | Rebounds | Season | Opponent |
|---|---|---|---|---|
| 1 | Scott Keeve | 24 | 1970–71 | Western Illinois |
| | Howard Long | 24 | 1958–59 | Northern Illinois |
| 3 | Bob Rickett | 22 | 1964–65 | Greenville College |
| | Bob Rickett | 22 | 1964–65 | UW Milwaukee |
| | Howard Long | 22 | 1957–58 | Indiana State |
| | B.J. Smith | 22 | 1957–58 | Illinois State |
| | Charlie Session | 22 | 1956–57 | Morningside College |
| 8 | Michael Slaughter | 20 | 1994–95 | Central Connecticut |
| | Bill Carson | 20 | 1967–68 | Western Illinois |
| | Lloyd Eggers | 20 | 1961–62 | Indiana State |
| | Lloyd Eggers | 20 | 1960–61 | Eastern Michigan |
| | Larry Friedrich | 20 | 1960–61 | UW Milwaukee |

== Assists ==
Career
| Rk | Player | Assists | Seasons |
|---|---|---|---|
| 1 | Terrell Lewis | 506 | 2014–15 2015–16 2016–17 2017–18 2018–19 |
| 2 | Johnny Hernandez | 415 | 1992–93 1993–94 1994–95 1995–96 |
| 3 | Derrick Scott | 347 | 1974–75 1975–76 1976–77 1977–78 |
| 4 | Jeremy Granger | 313 | 2008–09 2009–10 2010–11 2011–12 |
| 5 | Kyle Hill | 310 | 1997–98 1998–99 1999–00 2000–01 |
| 6 | Troy Richardson | 307 | 1983–84 1984–85 |
| 7 | Chad Peckinpaugh | 301 | 1995–96 1996–97 1997–98 |
| 8 | Jay Taylor | 292 | 1985–86 1986–87 1987–88 1988–89 |
| 9 | Gerald Jones | 290 | 1987–88 1988–89 1989–90 1990–91 |
| 10 | Derrick Landrus | 282 | 1991–92 1992–93 1993–94 1994–95 |
| | Jack Owens | 282 | 1997–98 1998–99 |

Season
| Rk | Player | Assists | Season |
|---|---|---|---|
| 1 | Troy Richardson | 197 | 1984–85 |
| 2 | Chad Peckinpaugh | 196 | 1996–97 |
| 3 | Cornell Johnston | 171 | 2015–16 |
| 4 | Matt Britton | 161 | 2000–01 |
| 5 | Jack Owens | 158 | 1998–99 |
| 6 | Kavien Martin | 157 | 1991–92 |
| 7 | Cornell Johnston | 156 | 2014–15 |
| 8 | Derrick Scott | 148 | 1977–78 |
| 9 | Johnny Hernandez | 140 | 1995–96 |
| 10 | Randy Coonce | 137 | 1968–69 |

Single game
| Rk | Player | Assists | Season | Opponent |
|---|---|---|---|---|
| 1 | Chad Peckinpaugh | 18 | 1996–97 | Southeast Missouri |
| 2 | Chad Peckinpaugh | 13 | 1996–97 | Eastern Kentucky |
| 3 | Kyle Hill | 12 | 2000–01 | Western Illinois |
| | Chad Peckinpaugh | 12 | 1996–97 | Tennessee State |
| | Chad Peckinpaugh | 12 | 1996–97 | Murray State |
| | Kavien Martin | 12 | 1991–92 | Cleveland State |
| | Vincent Smelter | 12 | 1983–84 | Cleveland State |
| | Troy Richardson | 12 | 1983–84 | Indiana State |
| | Tim Dykstra | 12 | 1982–83 | Ball State |

== Steals ==
Career
| Rk | Player | Steals | Seasons |
|---|---|---|---|
| 1 | Norm Evans | 175 | 1984–85 1985–86 1986–87 1987–88 |
| 2 | Steve Rowe | 168 | 1988–89 1989–90 1990–91 1991–92 |
| | Kyle Hill | 168 | 1997–98 1998–99 1999–00 2000–01 |
| 4 | Johnny Hernandez | 160 | 1992–93 1993–94 1994–95 1995–96 |
| 5 | Gerald Jones | 147 | 1987–88 1988–89 1989–90 1990–91 |
| 6 | Troy Richardson | 141 | 1983–84 1984–85 |
| | Rick Kaye | 141 | 1994–95 1995–96 1996–97 1997–98 |
| 8 | Henry Domercant | 138 | 1999–00 2000–01 2001–02 2002–03 |
| 9 | Jay Taylor | 136 | 1985–86 1986–87 1987–88 1988–89 |
| 10 | Doug Crook | 130 | 1981–82 1982–83 1984–85 1985–86 |
| | Mike Robinson | 130 | 2005–06 2006–07 2007–08 |

Season
| Rk | Player | Steals | Season |
|---|---|---|---|
| 1 | Troy Richardson | 80 | 1984–85 |
| 2 | Meechie White | 67 | 2025–26 |
| 3 | Mike Robinson | 65 | 2006–07 |
| 4 | Sincere Malone | 62 | 2022–23 |
| 5 | Troy Richardson | 61 | 1983–84 |
| 6 | Tiger Booker | 60 | 2023–24 |
| 7 | Kyle Hill | 59 | 1999–00 |
| | Steve Rowe | 59 | 1991–92 |
| | Norm Evans | 59 | 1985–86 |
| 10 | Gerald Jones | 58 | 1988–89 |

Single game
| Rk | Player | Steals | Season | Opponent |
|---|---|---|---|---|
| 1 | Mike Robinson | 8 | 2006–07 | Louisiana Monroe |

== Blocks ==
Career
| Rk | Player | Blocks | Seasons |
|---|---|---|---|
| 1 | Kevin Duckworth | 123 | 1982–83 1983–84 1984–85 1985–86 |
| 2 | Aboubacar Diallo | 101 | 2015–16 2016–17 2017–18 2018–19 |
| 3 | Eric Frankford | 100 | 1994–95 1995–96 1996–97 1997–98 |
| 4 | Muusa Dama | 97 | 2016–17 2017–18 |
| 5 | James Hollowell | 86 | 2008–09 2009–10 2010–11 2011–12 |
| 6 | Jesse Mackinson | 73 | 2000–01 2001–02 2002–03 2003–04 |
| 7 | Chris Olivier | 71 | 2013–14 2014–15 |
| | George Tandy | 71 | 2004–05 2005–06 |
| 9 | Luke Piotrowski | 70 | 2013–14 2014–15 2015–16 |
| 10 | Henry Domercant | 66 | 1999–00 2000–01 2001–02 2002–03 |

Season
| Rk | Player | Blocks | Season |
|---|---|---|---|
| 1 | Muusa Dama | 61 | 2016–17 |
| 2 | Eric Frankford | 55 | 1994–95 |
| 3 | Aboubacar Diallo | 47 | 2017–18 |
| 4 | Kevin Duckworth | 44 | 1984–85 |
| 5 | Kevin Duckworth | 42 | 1985–86 |
| 6 | George Tandy | 42 | 2004–05 |
| 7 | JaQualis Matlock | 39 | 2019–20 |
| 8 | Chris Olivier | 38 | 2014–15 |
| 9 | Terry McMorris | 37 | 2025–26 |
| 10 | Muusa Dama | 36 | 2017–18 |
| | James Hollowell | 36 | 2010–11 |
| | James Hollowell | 36 | 2009–10 |

Single game
| Rk | Player | Blocks | Season | Opponent |
|---|---|---|---|---|
| 1 | Chris Olivier | 6 | 2014–15 | UT Martin |
| | James Hollowell | 6 | 2009–10 | Jacksonville State |
