= 2017 in basketball =

The following are the basketball events of the year 2017 throughout the world.

The following are the basketball events that took place in 2017 throughout the world. Tournaments include international (FIBA), professional (club) and amateur and collegiate levels.

== National team tournaments ==
=== FIBA continental cups ===
Men:

- AfroBasket 2017 in Dakar and Tunis
  - (gold) Tunisia
  - (silver) Nigeria
  - (bronze) Senegal
- 2017 FIBA AmeriCup in Medellín, Montevideo, Bahía Blanca and Córdoba
  - (gold) United States
  - (silver) Argentina
  - (bronze) Mexico
- 2017 FIBA Asia Cup in Beirut
  - (gold) Australia
  - (silver) Iran
  - (bronze) South Korea
- EuroBasket 2017 in Helsinki, Tel Aviv, Cluj-Napoca and Istanbul
  - (gold) Slovenia
  - (silver) Serbia
  - (bronze) Spain

Women:

- AfroBasket Women 2017 in Bamako
  - (gold) Nigeria
  - (silver) Senegal
  - (bronze) Mali
- 2017 FIBA Women's AmeriCup in Buenos Aires
  - (gold) Canada
  - (silver) Argentina
  - (bronze) Puerto Rico
- 2017 FIBA Asia Women's Cup in Bangalore
  - (gold) Japan
  - (silver) Australia
  - (bronze) China
- EuroBasket Women 2017 in the Czech Republic
  - (gold) Spain
  - (silver) France
  - (bronze) Belgium

=== Other national team championships ===
In SABA and SEABA Championships, only the champion team will be able qualify to FIBA Asia Cup. Those teams winning the tournament are shown in bold text.
Men:

- 2017 EABA Championship in Tokyo:
  - (gold) Chinese Taipei
  - (silver) South Korea
  - (bronze) Japan
- 2017 Island Games at Gotland:
  - (gold) Cayman Islands
  - (silver) Gibraltar
  - (bronze) Saare County (Saaremaa)
- 2017 SABA Championship at Malé:
  - (gold) **India**
  - (silver) Bangladesh
  - (bronze) Sri Lanka
- 2017 SEABA Championship in Quezon City:
  - (gold) **Philippines**
  - (silver) Indonesia
  - (bronze) Thailand
- 2017 Southeast Asian Games at Kuala Lumpur:
  - (gold) Philippines
  - (silver) Indonesia
  - (bronze) Thailand
- 2017 WABA Championship in Amman:
  - (gold) Lebanon
  - (silver) Iran
  - (bronze) Jordan
- 2017 FIBA 3x3 World Cup at Nantes:
  - (gold) Serbia
  - (silver) Netherlands
  - (bronze) France
- 2017 William Jones Cup in Taipei:
  - (gold) Team Canada 150
  - (silver) Atletas All-Star Lithuania
  - (bronze) South Korea
- 2017 Games of the Small States of Europe at San Marino:
  - (gold) Cyprus
  - (silver) Montenegro
  - (bronze) Iceland

Women:

- 2017 Island Games at Gotland:
  - (gold) Menorca (Menorca)
  - (silver) Gotland (Gotland)
  - (bronze) Guernsey (GGY)
- 2017 Southeast Asian Games at Kuala Lumpur:
  - (gold) Malaysia
  - (silver) Thailand
  - (bronze) Indonesia
- 2017 William Jones Cup in Taipei:
  - (gold) Japan U24
  - (silver) Chinese Taipei Blue
  - (bronze) New Zealand
- 2017 Games of the Small States of Europe at San Marino:
  - (gold) Malta
  - (silver) Iceland
  - (bronze) Luxembourg

=== FIBA youth championships ===
Men:

- 2017 FIBA Under-19 Basketball World Cup in Cairo:
  - (gold) Canada
  - (silver) Italy
  - (bronze) United States

- 2017 FIBA Africa Under-16 Championship:
  - (gold) Mali
  - (silver) Egypt
  - (bronze) Algeria
- 2017 FIBA Americas Under-16 Championship:
  - (gold) United States
  - (silver) Canada
  - (bronze) Puerto Rico
- 2017 FIBA Asia Under-16 Championship:
- 2017 FIBA Europe Under-16 Championship:
  - (gold) France
  - (silver) Montenegro
  - (bronze) Serbia
- 2017 FIBA Oceania Under-16 Championship:
  - (gold) Australia
  - (silver) New Zealand
  - (bronze) Guam

- 2017 FIBA Europe Under-18 Championship in Bratislava:
  - (gold) Serbia
  - (silver) Spain
  - (bronze) Lithuania
- 2017 FIBA Europe Under-20 Championship in Crete:
  - (gold) Greece
  - (silver) Israel
  - (bronze) France

Women:

- 2017 FIBA Under-19 Women's Basketball World Cup in Italy:
  - (gold) Russia
  - (silver) United States
  - (bronze) Canada

- 2017 FIBA Africa Under-16 Championship for Women:
  - (gold) Mali
  - (silver) Mozambique
  - (bronze) Egypt
- 2017 FIBA Americas Under-16 Championship for Women:
  - (gold) United States
  - (silver) Canada
  - (bronze) Argentina
- 2017 FIBA Asia Under-16 Championship for Women in Bengaluru:
  - (gold) Australia
  - (silver) Japan
  - (bronze) China
- 2017 FIBA Europe Under-16 Championship for Women in Bratislava:
  - (gold) France
  - (silver) Hungary
  - (bronze) Italy
- 2017 FIBA Oceania Under-16 Championship for Women:
  - (gold) Australia
  - (silver) New Zealand
  - (bronze) Western Samoa

=== Other FIBA-sanctioned youth tournaments ===
Team in bold wins the championship while in italic is the team who qualify for the continental Championship they belong to.

Men's Division:

- 2017 SEABA Under-16 Championship in Quezon City:
  - (gold) **Philippines**
  - (silver) Malaysia
  - (bronze) Thailand

== Professional club seasons ==
=== FIBA Intercontinental Cup ===
Tournament	Champion	Runner-up	Result	Playoff format
2017 FIBA Intercontinental Cup	(Spain) Iberostar Tenerife	(Venezuela) Guaros de Lara	76–71	One-game playoff

=== Continental seasons ===
==== Men ====
Organizer	Tournament	Champion	Runner-up	Result	Playoff format
Euroleague Basketball	2016–17 EuroLeague	(Turkey) Fenerbahçe	(Greece) Olympiacos	80–64	One-game playoff
Euroleague Basketball	2016–17 EuroCup Basketball	(Spain) Unicaja	(Spain) Valencia Basket	2–1	Best-of-3 series
FIBA Africa	2017 FIBA Africa Clubs Champions Cup	(Morocco) AS Salé	(Tunisia) Étoile Sportive de Radès	77–69	One-game playoff
FIBA Americas	2017 FIBA Americas League	(Colombia) Guaros de Lara	(Argentina) Weber Bahía Basket	88–65	One-game playoff
FIBA Asia	2017 FIBA Asia Champions Cup	(Lebanon) Al-Riyadi Beirut	China Kashgar	88–59	One-game playoff
FIBA Europe	2016–17 Basketball Champions League	(Spain) Iberostar Tenerife	(Turkey) Banvit	63–59	One-game playoff
FIBA Europe	2016–17 FIBA Europe Cup	(France) Nanterre 92	(France) Élan Chalon	140–137	Two-legged tie

==== Women ====
Organizer	Tournament	Champion	Runner-up	Result	Playoff format
Euroleague Basketball	2016–17 EuroLeague Women	(Russia) Dynamo Kursk	(Turkey) Fenerbahçe	77–63	One-game playoff
Euroleague Basketball	2016–17 EuroCup Women	(Turkey) Yakın Doğu Üniversitesi	(Turkey) Bellona AGÜ	136–127	Two-legged tie

=== Regional seasons ===
==== Men ====
Region	Tournament	Champion	Runner-up	Result	Playoff format
Former Yugoslavia	2016–17 ABA League	(Serbia) Crvena zvezda mts	(Croatia) Cedevita	3–0	Best-of-5 series
Southeast Asia	2016–17 ABL season	(Hong Kong) Eastern Sports Club	Singapore Slingers	3–1	Best-of-5 series
Alpe-Adria	2016–17 Alpe Adria Cup	(Slovakia) Rieker Komárno	(Slovenia) Helios Suns	160–139	Two-legged tie
Baltic states	2016–17 Baltic Basketball League	(Lithuania) Vytautas	(Lithuania) Pieno žvaigždės	174–162	Two-legged tie
Balkans	2016–17 BIBL	(Bulgaria) Beroe	(North Macedonia) Kumanovo	161–128	Two-legged tie

==== Women ====
Region	Tournament	Champion	Runner-up	Result	Playoff format
Balkans	2016–17 WABA League	(Slovenia) Athlete Celje	(Bulgaria) Beroe	61–57	One-game playoff

=== Domestic league seasons ===
==== Men ====
Nation	League	Champion	Runner-up	Result	Playoff format
Albania	2016–17 Albanian Basketball League	PBC Tirana	BC Vllaznia	3–0	Best-of-5 series
Angola	2016–17 BIC Basket	Rec do Libolo	Petro Atlético	4–0	Best-of-7 series
Argentina	2016–17 Liga Nacional de Básquet season	San Lorenzo	Regatas Corrientes	4–1	Best-of-7 series
Austria	2016–17 Österreichische Basketball Bundesliga	Kapfenberg Bulls	Oberwart Gunners	4–1	Best-of-7 series
Australia (Note: Includes one team from New Zealand.)	2016–17 NBL season	Perth Wildcats	Illawarra Hawks	3–0	Best-of-5 series
Belarus	2016–17 Belarusian Premier League	Tsmoki Minsk	Grodno 93	3–0	Best-of-5 series
Belgium	2016–17 Belgian Basketball League	Telenet Oostende	Basic-Fit Brussels	3–1	Best-of-5 series
Belgium	2016–17 Belgian Basketball Cup	Telenet Oostende	Limburg United	76–60	Single-game final
Bosnia and Herzegovina	2016–17 Basketball Championship of Bosnia and Herzegovina	KK Igokea	KK Bosna Royal	3–2	Best-of-5 series
Brazil	2016–17 NBB season	Bauru Basket	Paulistano	3–2	Best-of-5 series
Bulgaria	2016–17 National Basketball League	Lukoil Academic	BC Beroe	3–1	Best-of-5 series
Bulgaria	2017 Bulgarian Basketball Cup	Beroe	Lukoil Academic	78–62	Single-game final
Canada	2016–17 NBL Canada season	London Lightning	Halifax Hurricanes	4–2	Best-of-7 series
China	2016–17 CBA season	Xinjiang Flying Tigers	Guangdong Southern Tigers	4–0	Best-of-7 series
Croatia	2016–17 A-1 League	Cedevita	Cibona	3–2	Best-of-5 series
Cyprus	2016–17 Cyprus Basketball Division A	Keravnos	AEK Larnaca	3–1	Best-of-5 series
Czech Republic	2015–16 National Basketball League	CEZ Nymburk	BK Decin	152–137	Two-legged tie
Denmark	2016–17 Basketligaen	Bakken Bears	Horsens IC	4–1	Best-of-7 series
Estonia	2016–17 KML season	Kalev/Cramo	AVIS UTILITAS Rapla	4–0	Best-of-7 series
Finland	2016–17 Korisliiga season	Kataja Basket	Salon Vilpas	4–2	Best-of-7 series
France (Note: Includes one team from Monaco.)	2016–17 Pro A season	Élan Chalon	SIG Strasbourg	3–2	Best-of-5 series
France	2016–17 French Basketball Cup	Nanterre 92	Le Mans	96–79	Single-game final
France	2017 Leaders Cup	AS Monaco	ASVEL	95–91	Single-game final
Georgia	2016–17 Georgian Superliga	Dinamo	Kutaisi	3–0	Best-of-5 series
Germany	2016–17 Basketball Bundesliga	Brose Bamberg	EWE Baskets Oldenburg	3–0	Best-of-5 series
Germany	2017 BBL-Pokal	Brose Bamberg	Bayern Munich	74–71	Single-game final
Great Britain	2016–17 British Basketball League season	Leicester Riders	Newcastle Eagles	84–63	Single-game final
Greece	2016–17 Greek Basket League	Panathinaikos Superfoods	Olympiacos	3–2	Best-of-5 series
Greece	2016–17 Greek Basketball Cup	Panathinaikos Superfoods	Aris	68–59	Single-game final
Hungary	2016–17 Nemzeti Bajnokság I/A	Alba Fehérvár	Falco KC Szombathely	3–2	Best-of-5 series
Hungary	2017 Magyar Kupa	Alba Fehérvár	Szolnoki Olaj KK	59–58	Single-game final
Iceland	2016–17 Úrvalsdeild karla	KR	Grindavík	3–2	Best-of-5 series
Indonesia	2017 IBL Indonesia	Pelita Jaya Energi Mega Persada	Satria Muda Pertamina Jakarta	2–1	Best-of-3 series
Ireland	2016–17 Irish Premier League season	Tralee Warriors	Templeogue	74–73	Single-game final
Israel	2016–17 Israeli Basketball Super League	Hapoel Jerusalem	Maccabi Hunter Haifa	83–76	Single-game final
Israel	2016–17 Israeli Basketball State Cup	Maccabi Tel Aviv	Hapoel Jerusalem	82–68	Single-game final
Italy	2016–17 Lega Basket Serie A	Umana Reyer Venezia	Dolomiti Energia Trento	4–2	Best-of-7 series
Italy	2017 Italian Basketball Cup	EA7 Emporio Armani Milano	Banco di Sardegna Sassari	84–74	Single-game final
Japan	2016–17 B.League season	Link Tochigi Brex	Toshiba Kawasaki Brave Thunders	85–79	Single-game final
Kosovo	2016–17 Kosovo Basketball Superleague	Sigal Prishtina	Bashkimi	3–1	Best-of-5 series
Latvia	2016–17 Latvian Basketball League	VEF Rīga	BK Ventspils	4–0	Best-of-7 series
Lithuania	2016–17 LKL season	Žalgiris	Lietkabelis	4–1	Best-of-7 series
Lithuania	2017 Karaliaus Mindaugo taurė	Žalgiris	Lietkabelis	84–63	Single-game final
North Macedonia	2016–17 Macedonian First League	MZT Skopje	Karpoš Sokoli	3–2	Best-of-5 series
Mexico	2016–17 LNBP season	Fuerza Regia	Soles	4–2	Best-of-7 series
Montenegro	2016–17 Prva A liga	Budućnost VOLI	Mornar	3–2	Best-of-5 series
Netherlands	2016–17 Dutch Basketball League	Donar Groningen	Landstede Zwolle	4–1	Best-of-7 series
Netherlands	2016–17 NBB Cup	Donar Groningen	Landstede Zwolle	78–58	Single-game final
New Zealand	2017 New Zealand NBL season	Wellington Saints	Southland Sharks	108–75	Single-game final
Philippines	2016–17 PBA Philippine Cup	San Miguel Beermen	Barangay Ginebra San Miguel	4–1	Best-of-7 series
Philippines	2017 PBA Commissioner's Cup	San Miguel Beermen	TNT KaTropa	4–2	Best-of-7 series
Philippines	2017 PBA Governors' Cup	Barangay Ginebra San Miguel	Meralco Bolts	4–3	Best-of-7 series
Philippines	2017 PBA D-League Aspirant's Cup	Cignal-San Beda Hawkeyes	Racal Ceramica	2–1	Best-of-3 series
Puerto Rico	2017 BSN season	Piratas de Quebradillas	Capitanes de Arecibo	4–3	Best-of-7 series
Poland	2016–17 PLK season	Stelmet Zielona Góra	Polski Cukier Toruń	4–1	Best-of-7 series
Portugal	2016–17 LPB season	Benfica	Porto	3–0	Best-of-5 series
Romania	2016–17 Liga Națională	U-BT Cluj-Napoca	Steaua CSM EximBank	3–0	Best-of-5 series
Russia (Note: Includes one team each from Belarus, Estonia, Kazakhstan and Latvia. The highest ranking team from Russia is also named as Russian champions.)	2016–17 VTB United League	CSKA Moscow	Khimki	3–0	Best-of-5 series
Serbia	2016–17 Basketball League of Serbia	Crvena zvezda mts	FMP	3–0	Best-of-5 series
Serbia	2016–17 Radivoj Korać Cup	Crvena zvezda mts	Partizan NIS	74–64	Single-game final
Slovakia	2016–17 Slovak Extraliga	Inter Bratislava	Rieker Com Therm Komárno	4–1	Best-of-7 series
Slovenia	2016–17 Slovenian Basketball League	Union Olimpija	Rogaška	3–1	Best-of-5 series
Spain (Note: Includes one team from Andorra.)	2016–17 ACB season	Valencia	Real Madrid	3–1	Best-of-5 series
Spain	2017 Copa del Rey de Baloncesto	Real Madrid	Valencia Basket	97–95	Single-game final
Sweden	2016–17 Basketligan season	Luleå	Södertälje Kings	4–1	Best-of-7 series
Switzerland	2016–17 Championnat LNA season	Monthey	Lions de Genève	4–2	Best-of-7 series
Turkey	2016–17 Basketbol Süper Ligi	Fenerbahçe	Beşiktaş Sompo Japan	4–0	Best-of-7 series
Turkey	2017 Turkish Cup Basketball	Banvit	Anadolu Efes	75–66	Single-game final
Ukraine	2016–17 Ukrainian Basketball SuperLeague	Budivelnyk	BC Khimik	3–1	Best-of-5 series
Vietnam	2017 VBA season	Thang Long Warriors	Cantho Catfish	3–2	Best-of-5 series
United States (Note: Includes one team from Canada.)	2016–17 NBA season	Golden State Warriors	Cleveland Cavaliers	4–1	Best-of-7 series}
United States	2017 NBA Summer League	Los Angeles Lakers	Portland Trail Blazers	110–98	Single-game final
United States	2016–17 NBA Development League season	Raptors 905	Rio Grande Valley Vipers	2–1	Best-of-3 series

==== Women ====
Nation	League	Champion	Runner-up	Result	Playoff format
Australia	2016–17 WNBL season	Sydney Uni Flames	Dandenong Rangers	2–0	Best-of-3 series
Hungary	2016–17 Nemzeti Bajnokság I/A	UNIQA Sopron	Atomerőmű KSC Szekszárd	3–1	Best-of-5 series
Iceland	2016–17 Úrvalsdeild kvenna	Keflavík	Snæfell	3–1	Best-of-5 series
Iceland	2016–17 Icelandic Women's Basketball Cup	Keflavík	Skallagrímur	65–62	One-game playoff
Romania	2016–17 Liga Națională	Sepsi SIC	Universitatea Cluj	3–1	Best-of-5 series
Serbia	2016–17 First Women's Basketball League of Serbia	Crvena zvezda	Radivoj Korać	3–1	Best-of-5 series
Spain	2016–17 Liga Femenina de Baloncesto	Perfumerías Avenida	Spar CityLift Girona	2–1	Best-of-3 series
Turkey	2016–17 Turkish Women's Basketball League	Yakın Doğu Üniversitesi	Fenerbahçe	3–2	Best-of-5 series
United Kingdom	2016–17 Women's British Basketball League season				
United States	2017 WNBA season	Minnesota Lynx	Los Angeles Sparks	3–2	Best-of-5 series

== College seasons ==
Nation	League / Tournament	Champions	Runners-up	Result	Playoff format
Canada	2017 U Sports Men's Basketball Championship	Carleton Ravens	Ryerson Rams	78–69	Single-game final
Philippines	NCAA Season 93	San Beda Red Lions	Lyceum Pirates	2–0	Best-of-three series
Philippines	UAAP Season 80	Ateneo Blue Eagles	De La Salle Green Archers	2–1	Best-of-three series
United States	NCAA Division I	North Carolina Tar Heels	Gonzaga Bulldogs	71–65	Single-game final
United States	2017 National Invitation Tournament	TCU Horned Frogs	Georgia Tech Yellow Jackets	88–56	Single-game final
United States	NCAA Division II	NW Missouri State Bearcats	Fairmont State Falcons	71–61	Single-game final
United States	NCAA Division III	Babson Beavers	Augustana (IL) Vikings	79–78	Single-game final

== Headlines ==
- December 19 – The Naismith Memorial Basketball Hall of Fame announces significant changes to its enshrinement process.
  - Effective immediately, players, coaches, and referees will now be eligible for induction after three full seasons of retirement.
  - Effective with the induction class of 2020, active coaches must have served in that role for 25 years and be at least age 60.

== Deaths ==
- January 23 — Earl Foreman, American ABA owner (Virginia Squires) (born 1924)
- January 26 — Mario Quintero, Cuban Olympic player (1948, 1952) (born 1924)
- January 27 — Charles Shackleford, American NBA player (New Jersey Nets, Philadelphia 76ers) (born 1966)
- January 31 — Bobby Watson, American NBA player (Minneapolis Lakers, Milwaukee Hawks) and college national champion at Kentucky (1951) (born 1930)
- February 11 — Fab Melo, Brazilian NBA player (Boston Celtics) (born 1990)
- February 19 — Dean Ehlers, American college coach (Memphis, James Madison) (born 1929)
- February 25 — Neil Fingleton, British player (CB Illescas) (born 1980)
- March 6 – Bill Hougland, American player (Phillips 66ers) and Olympic champion (1952, 1956) (born 1930)
- March 10 – Ben Jobe, American college coach (Southern, South Carolina State, Alabama A&M) (born 1933)
- March 13 – John Andariese, American college and NBA announcer (New York Knicks) (born 1938)
- March 15 – Dave Stallworth, American NBA player (New York Knicks, Baltimore Bullets) (born 1941)
- March 15 – Chris Williams, American player (Sydney Kings, Skyliners Frankfurt, Qingdao DoubleStar) (born 1980)
- March 18 – Gerry Gimelstob, American college coach (George Washington) (born 1951)
- March 20 – David Lawrence, American player (McNeese State, Pallacanestro Trieste, Saski Baskonia) (born 1959)
- March 21 – Jerry Krause, American NBA executive (Chicago Bulls) (born 1939)
- March 29 – Wayne Duke, Hall of Fame college administrator (Big Eight Conference, Big Ten Conference) (born 1928)
- April 20 – Skeeter Swift, American ABA player (New Orleans Buccaneers, Pittsburgh Condors, San Antonio Spurs) and college coach (Liberty) (born 1946)
- April 22 – Jess Kersey, American NBA referee (born 1941)
- April 23 – Ken Sears, American NBA player (New York Knicks, San Francisco Warriors) (born 1933)
- May 2 – Toby Kimball, American NBA player (born 1942)
- May 4 – Jay Carty, American NBA player (Los Angeles Lakers) (born 1941)
- May 8 – Chuck Orsborn, American college coach (Bradley) (born 1917)
- May 8 – George Irvine, American ABA player (Virginia Squires, Denver Nuggets) and NBA coach (Indiana Pacers, Detroit Pistons) (born 1948)
- May 13 – Ron Bontemps, American Olympic player (1952) (born 1926)
- May 14 – Frank Brian, American NBA player (Anderson Packers, Tri-Cities Blackhawks, Fort Wayne Pistons) (born 1923)
- May 27 – Robert Curtis, American NBL Canada player (Saint John Mill Rats) (born 1990)
- May 31 – Ramon Campos Jr., Filipino Olympic player (1948, 1952, 1956) (born 1925)
- June 1 – Jack McCloskey, American NBA player (Philadelphia Warriors) and coach (Portland Trail Blazers) and college coach (Penn, Wake Forest) (born 1925)
- June 10 – Mihai Nedef, Romanian Olympic player (1952) (born 1931)
- June 17 – Omar Monza, Argentine Olympic player (1952) (born 1929)
- June 30 – Darrall Imhoff, American college All-American (California), NBA player and Olympic Gold medalist (1960) (born 1938)
- July 4 – Gene Conley, American NBA player (Boston Celtics, New York Knicks) (born 1930)
- July 6 – Les Habegger, 92, American college (Seattle Pacific) and NBA coach (Seattle SuperSonics).
- July 11 – Bill Chambers, American college player and coach (William & Mary) (born 1930)
- July 14 – Ross Giudice, American college coach (San Francisco) (born 1924)
- July 15 – Bob Wolff, American announcer (New York Knicks, Detroit Pistons) (born 1920)
- July 16 – Jerry Bird, American NBA player (New York Knicks) (born 1934)
- July 23 – John Kundla, American Hall of Fame coach (Minneapolis Lakers, Minnesota Golden Gophers) (born 1916)
- August 3 – Dickie Hemric, American NBA player (Boston Celtics) (born 1933)
- August 13 – Nick Mantis, American NBA player (Minneapolis Lakers, St. Louis Hawks, Chicago Zephyrs) (born 1935)
- August 16 – Tom Hawkins, American NBA player (Los Angeles Lakers, Cincinnati Royals) (born 1936)
- August 26 – Adam Wójcik, Polish player (Śląsk Wrocław, Prokom Sopot, Turów Zgorzelec) (born 1970)
- August 28 – Jud Heathcote, American college coach (Montana, Michigan State) (born 1927)
- August 30 – Rollie Massimino, American college coach (Villanova, UNLV, Cleveland State) (born 1934)
- September 6 — Jim McDaniels, American NBA (Seattle SuperSonics, Los Angeles Lakers, Buffalo Braves) and ABA (Carolina Cougars, Kentucky Colonels) player. (born 1948)
- September 17 — Cris Bolado, Filipino player (Alaska Aces, Star Hotshots, San Miguel Beermen) (born 1969)
- September 21 – Glen Whisby, 44, American player
- September 23 — Loreto Carbonell, Filipino Olympic player (1956) (born 1933)
- September 30 — Frank Hamblen, American NBA coach (Milwaukee Bucks, Los Angeles Lakers) (born 1947)
- October 1 — Dave Strader, American college announcer (born 1955)
- October 6 — Connie Hawkins, American Hall of Fame Harlem Globetrotters, ABA and NBA player (Phoenix Suns, Los Angeles Lakers) (born 1942)
- October 16 — Kevin Cadle, American basketball coach (Kingston Kings, British national team) and NBA announcer (born 1955)
- October 19 — Dick DiBiaso, 76, American college coach (Stanford).
- October 20 — Justin Reed, American NBA player (Boston Celtics, Minnesota Timberwolves) (born 1982)
- October 30 — János Halász, Hungarian Olympic player (1948) (born 1929)
- October 31 — Red Murrell, American college (Drake) and AAU (Phillips 66ers) player (born 1933)
- November 3 — Sid Catlett, American player (Cincinnati Royals) (born 1948)
- November 5 — Don Eddy, American college coach (Eastern Illinois, UTSA) (born 1935)
- November 13 — Jeff Capel II, American college coach (Fayetteville State, North Carolina A&T, Old Dominion) (born 1953)
- November 17 — Aleksandr Salnikov, Ukrainian Olympic player (1976, 1980) (born 1949)
- November 19 — Luther Rackley, American NBA and ABA player (born 1946)
- November 19 — Elias Tolentino, Filipino Olympic player (1968) (born 1942)
- November 25 — Steve "Snapper" Jones, American ABA and NBA player and NBA announcer (born 1942)
- December 1 — Perry Wallace, American college player (Vanderbilt) and first African-American player in the Southeastern Conference (born 1948)
- December 4 — Armenak Alachachian, Armenian Olympic Silver Medalist (1964) (born 1930)
- December 6 — George E. Killian, American administrator. President of FIBA and the Naismith Memorial Basketball Hall of Fame (born 1924)
- December 7 — Roland Taylor, American ABA/NBA player (Virginia Squires, Denver Nuggets) (born 1946)
- December 11 — Birgir Örn Birgis, Icelandic national team player and coach (born 1942)
- December 21 — Dick Enberg, college announcer (UCLA) (born 1935)
- December 25 – Michael Britt, 57, American college player (District of Columbia).
- December 26 — Orsten Artis, American college player (UTEP), NCAA champion (1966) (born 1943)

== See also ==
- Timeline of women's basketball
