= 2000–01 Eastern Illinois Panthers men's basketball team =

American college basketball season

2000–01 Eastern Illinois Panthers men's basketball
- Conference: Ohio Valley Conference
- Record: 21–10 (11–5 Ohio Valley)
- Head coach: Rick Samuels (21st season)
- Home arena: Lantz Arena

2000–01 Ohio Valley Conference men's basketball standings
	Conf.				Overall
Team	W		L	PCT	W		L	PCT
Tennessee Tech	13	–	3	.813	20	–	9	.690
Eastern Illinois †	11	–	5	.688	21	–	10	.677
Murray State	11	–	5	.688	17	–	12	.586
Austin Peay	10	–	6	.625	22	–	10	.688
Southeast Missouri State	8	–	8	.500	18	–	12	.600
Tennessee State	7	–	9	.438	10	–	19	.345
Morehead State	6	–	10	.375	12	–	16	.429
Tennessee-Martin	5	–	11	.313	10	–	18	.357
Eastern Kentucky	1	–	15	.063	7	–	19	.269
† 2001 Ohio Valley Tournament winner Rankings from AP Poll

The 2000–01 Eastern Illinois Panthers men's basketball team represented Eastern Illinois University as a member of the Ohio Valley Conference during the 2000–01 NCAA Division I men's basketball season. This was Rick Samuels' 21st season as head coach at Eastern Illinois. After finishing second in the conference regular season standings, Eastern Illinois won the OVC tournament to secure the conference's automatic bid to the NCAA tournament. Playing as No. 15 seed in the Midwest region, the Panthers were beaten by No. 2 seed and eventual National runner-up Arizona, 101–76, in the opening round.

2000–01 Eastern Illinois Panthers men's basketball team
Players
Coaches

Pos.	#	Name	Height	Weight	Year	Hometown
G		Kyle Hill	6 ft 3 in (1.91 m)	185 lb (84 kg)	Sr	Chicago, Illinois
G		Henry Domercant	6 ft 4 in (1.93 m)	205 lb (93 kg)	So	Chicago, Illinois

Head coach

- Rick Samuels

Assistant coach(es)

Legend

- (C) Team captain
- (S) Suspended
- (I) Ineligible
- (W) Walk-on
- Injured
- Current redshirt

Roster

== Schedule and results ==
Date time, TV	Rank^{#}	Opponent^{#}	Result	Record	Site city, state
Regular season
Nov 18, 2000*		at Butler	L 73–90	0–1	Hinkle Fieldhouse; Indianapolis, Indiana
Nov 21, 2000*		at Nebraska	L 71–85	0–2	Bob Devaney Sports Center; Lincoln, Nebraska
Ohio Valley tournament
Feb 27, 2001*		Morehead State; Quarterfinals	W 102–80	19–9	Lantz Arena; Charleston, Illinois
Mar 2, 2001*		vs. Murray State; Semifinals	W 97–71	20–9	Gaylord Entertainment Center; Nashville, Tennessee
Mar 3, 2001*		vs. Austin Peay; Championship game	W 84–83	21–9	Gaylord Entertainment Center; Nashville, Tennessee
NCAA tournament
Mar 16, 2001*	(15 MW)	vs. (2 MW) No. 5 Arizona; First round	L 76–101	21–10	Kemper Arena; Kansas City, Missouri
*Non-conference game. ^{#}Rankings from AP Poll. (#) Tournament seedings in parentheses. MW=Midwest. All times are in Central Time.
