= 1999–2000 Eastern Illinois Panthers men's basketball team =

American college basketball season

1999–2000 Eastern Illinois Panthers men's basketball
- Conference: Ohio Valley Conference
- Record: 17–12 (11–7 Ohio Valley)
- Head coach: Rick Samuels (20th season)
- Home arena: Lantz Arena

1999–2000 Ohio Valley Conference men's basketball standings
	Conf.				Overall
Team	W		L	PCT	W		L	PCT
Murray State	14	–	4	.778	23	–	9	.719
Southeast Missouri State †	14	–	4	.778	24	–	7	.774
Tennessee Tech	11	–	7	.611	16	–	12	.571
Eastern Illinois	11	–	7	.611	17	–	12	.586
Austin Peay	11	–	7	.611	18	–	10	.643
Middle Tennessee	10	–	8	.556	15	–	13	.536
UT Martin	7	–	11	.389	10	–	19	.345
Tennessee State	6	–	12	.333	7	–	22	.241
Morehead State	4	–	14	.222	9	–	18	.333
Eastern Kentucky	2	–	16	.111	6	–	21	.222
† 2000 Ohio Valley Tournament winner Rankings from AP Poll

The 1999–2000 Eastern Illinois Panthers men's basketball team represented the Eastern Illinois University during the 1999–2000 NCAA Division I men's basketball season. This was Rick Samuels' 20th season as head coach at Eastern Illinois.

Guard Kyle Hill was leading scorer, averaging 19.1 points per game, junior forward Merve Joseph with 7.3 rebounds per games.

== Schedule ==
Date time, TV	Rank^{#}	Opponent^{#}	Result	Record	Site city, state
November 21*		at Iowa	L 79–95	0–1	Carver-Hawkeye Arena; Iowa City, Iowa
November 23*		at Nebraska	L 78–81 ^{2OT}	0–2	Bob Devaney Sports Center; Lincoln, Nebraska
November 29*		Illinois College	W 94–47	1–2	Lantz Arena; Charleston, Illinois
December 2		at Middle Tennessee	W 76–72	2–2 (1–0)	Murphy Athletic Center
December 4		at Tennessee Tech	L 97–107 ^{2OT}	2–3 (1–1)	Eblen Center; Cookeville, Tennessee
December 7*		Bulter	W 69–60 ^{OT}	3–3 (1–1)	Lantz Arena; Charleston, Illinois
December 11*		at Western Illinois	W 82–66	4–3 (1–1)	Western Hall; Macomb, Illinois
December 19*		at Indiana State	L 91–102 ^{2OT}	4–4 (1–1)	Hulman Center; Terre Haute, Indiana
December 23*		Arkansas State	W 90–70	4–5 (1–1)	Lantz Arena; Charleston, Illinois
December 30*		at Evansville	L 69–92	4–6 (1–1)	Roberts Stadium
January 6		Austin Peay	W 75–73	5–6 (2–1)	Lantz Arena; Charleston, Illinois
January 8		Tennessee State	W 81–50	6–6 (3–1)	Lantz Arena; Charleston, Illinois
January 13		at Murray State	L 69–83	6–7 (3–2)	Regional Special Events Center; Murray, Kentucky
January 15		at Tennessee-Martin	L 65–74	6–8 (3–3)	Skyhawk Arena
January 18		Middle Tennessee	W 69–63	7–8 (4–3)	Lantz Arena; Charleston, Illinois
January 22		at Southeast Missouri State	L 66–77	7–9 (4–4)	Show Me Center; Cape Girardeau, Missouri
January 27		Eastern Kentucky	W 85–57	8–9 (5–4)	Lantz Arena; Charleston, Illinois
January 29		Morehead State	W 89–69	9–9 (6–4)	Lantz Arena; Charleston, Illinois
February 3		at Austin Peay	L 69–70	10–9 (6–5)	Winfield Dunn Center
February 5		at Tennessee State	W 98–78	11–9 (7–5)	Gentry Center Complex
February 8		Tennessee Tech	W 73–64	12–9 (8–5)	Lantz Arena; Charleston, Illinois
February 10		Murray State	L 67–75	12–10 (8–6)	Lantz Arena; Charleston, Illinois
February 12		Tennessee-Martin	W 82–75	13–10 (9–6)	Lantz Arena; Charleston, Illinois
February 16*		St. Francis (IL)	W 87–57	14–10 (9–6)	Lantz Arena; Charleston, Illinois
February 19		Southeast Missouri State	L 71–72	14–11 (9–7)	Lantz Arena; Charleston, Illinois
February 24		at Eastern Kentucky	W 90–47	15–11 (10–7)	McBrayer Arena
February 26		at Morehead State	W 105–92	16–11 (11–7)	Ellis T. Johnson Arena
Ohio Valley tournament
February 29		at Austin Peay	W 107–100 ^{2OT}	17–11 (11–7)	Winfield Dunn Center
March 4		vs. Murray State	L 70–89	17–12 (11–7)	Bridgestone Arena; Nashville, Tennessee
*Non-conference game. ^{#}Rankings from AP Poll. (#) Tournament seedings in parentheses.
