= 1979–80 Eastern Illinois Panthers men's basketball team =

American college basketball season

1979–80 Eastern Illinois Panthers men's basketball

NCAA tournament
- Conference: Mid-Continent Conference
- Record: 22–7 (5–3 Mid-Cont)
- Head coach: Don Eddy
- Home arena: Lantz Arena

The 1979–80 Eastern Illinois Panthers men's basketball team represented the Eastern Illinois University during the 1979–80 NCAA Division II men's basketball season.

== Roster ==
1979–80 Eastern Illinois Panthers men's basketball team
| Players | Coaches |
|---|---|
| Pos. / # / Name / Height / Weight / Year / Hometown; F / 42 / Craig DeWitt / 6 ft 8 in (2.03 m) / 190 lb (86 kg) / Sr / Grand Rapids, Michigan | Head coach: Don Eddy; Assistant coach(es) Legend: (C) Team captain; (S) Suspended; (I) Ineligible; (W) Walk-on; Injured; Current redshirt |

== Schedule ==
| Date time, TV | Rank^{#} | Opponent^{#} | Result | Record | Site city, state |
|---|---|---|---|---|---|
| December 1* | | Missouri State | W 71–61 | 1–0 | Lantz Arena; Charleston, Illinois |
| December 4* | | at St. Joseph (IN) | W 82–69 | 2–0 | |
| December 6* | | at Millikin | W 67–58 | 3–0 | |
| December 12* | | Truman State | W 85–51 | 4–0 | Lantz Arena; Charleston, Illinois |
| December 14* | | vs. Illinois State | L 59–64 | 4–1 | State Farm Center; Champaign, Illinois |
| December 15* | | vs. Kentucky State | W 65–59 | 5–1 | State Farm Center; Champaign, Illinois |
| December 17* | | Armstrong Atlantic | W 84–75 | 6–1 | Lantz Arena; Charleston, Illinois |
| December 19* | | UIC | W 71–60 | 7–1 | Lantz Arena; Charleston, Illinois |
| December 22* | | at Missouri St. Louis | W 76–60 | 8–1 | |
| December 28* | | at Puget Sound | L 54–77 | 8–2 | Tacoma, Washington |
| December 29* | | vs. Boise State | W 77–72 | 8–2 | Tacoma, Washington |
| January 11* | | Wisconsin-Platteville | W 81–65 | 9–2 | Lantz Arena; Charleston, Illinois |
| January 17 | | Northern Iowa | W 77–53 | 10–2 (1–0) | Lantz Arena; Charleston, Illinois |
| January 19 | | Northern Michigan | L 68–69 | 10–3 (1–1) | Lantz Arena; Charleston, Illinois |
| January 21* | | Bryant | W 83–58 | 11–3 (1–1) | Lantz Arena; Charleston, Illinois |
| January 24* | | at Missouri State | W 84–70 | 12–3 (1–1) | |
| January 26 | | at Western Illinois | W 72–69 | 12–4 (1–2) | |
| January 31 | | at Youngstown State | L 60–70 | 12–5 (1–3) | |
| February 2* | | Merrimack | W 74–56 | 13–5 (1–3) | Lantz Arena; Charleston, Illinois |
| February 4* | | St. Joseph (IN) | W 86–78 | 14–5 (1–3) | Lantz Arena; Charleston, Illinois |
| February 7* | | Roosevelt | W 87–58 | 15–5 (1–3) | Lantz Arena; Charleston, Illinois |
| February 9 | | Youngstown State | W 86–67 | 16–5 (2–3) | Lantz Arena; Charleston, Illinois |
| February 14 | | at Northern Michigan | L 76–77 | 16–7 (2–4) | |
| February 16 | | at Northern Iowa | W 47–46 | 17–7 (3–4) | |
| February 18* | | Missouri St. Louis | L 59–67 | 17–6 (3–4) | Lantz Arena; Charleston, Illinois |
| February 20* | | Northern Kentucky | W 90–62 | 18–6 (3–4) | Lantz Arena; Charleston, Illinois |
| February 23 | | Western Illinois | W 90–75 | 19–6 (4–4) | Lantz Arena; Charleston, Illinois |
| February 29 | | at Wright State; NCAA tournament • First Round | W 74–63 | 20–6 (4–4) | |
| March 1 | | at Northern Michigan; NCAA tournament • Regional Final | L 56–58 | 20–7 (4–4) | |
*Non-conference game. ^{#}Rankings from AP Poll. (#) Tournament seedings in parentheses.
