= 1993 Mid-Continent Conference men's basketball tournament =

- Classification: Division I
- Season: 1992–93
- Teams: 8
- Site: Nutter Center; Fairborn, Ohio
- Champions: Wright State (1st title)
- Winning coach: Ralph Underhill
- Mid-Continent Conference men's basketball tournaments

1992–93 Mid-Continent Conference men's basketball standings
	Conf.				Overall
Team	W		L	PCT	W		L	PCT
Cleveland State	15	–	1	.938	22	–	6	.786
Northern Illinois	10	–	6	.625	15	–	12	.556
Wright State †	10	–	6	.625	20	–	10	.667
Illinois–Chicago	9	–	7	.563	17	–	15	.531
Wisconsin–Green Bay	9	–	7	.563	13	–	14	.481
Eastern Illinois	7	–	9	.438	10	–	17	.370
Valparaiso	7	–	9	.438	12	–	16	.429
Western Illinois	4	–	12	.250	7	–	20	.259
Youngstown State	1	–	15	.063	3	–	23	.115
† 1993 Mid-Con Tournament winner Rankings from AP Poll

The 1993 Mid-Continent Conference men's basketball tournament was held March 7–9, 1993, at the Nutter Center in Fairborn, Ohio. This was the tenth edition of the tournament for the Association of Mid-Continent Universities, now known as the Summit League. The winner of this tournament would go on receive a birth to the 1993 NCAA Division I men's basketball tournament, often referred to as NCAA March Madness, later that month.

== Bracket ==
Quarterfinals; March 7
1	Cleveland State	64
8	Western Illinois	53
4	Illinois–Chicago	46
5	Wisconsin–Green Bay	43
2	Northern Illinois	75
7	Valparaiso	83
6	Eastern Illinois	58
3	Wright State	94

Semifinals; March 8
1	Cleveland State	68
4	Illinois–Chicago	96
7	Valparaiso	72
3	Wright State	82

Final; March 9
4	Illinois–Chicago	88
3	Wright State	94
