= 2001 Ohio Valley Conference men's basketball tournament =

- Classification: Division I
- Season: 2000–01
- Teams: 8
- First round site: Campus Sites
- Semifinals site: Gaylord Entertainment Center; Nashville, Tennessee
- Finals site: Gaylord Entertainment Center; Nashville, Tennessee
- Champions: Eastern Illinois (1st title)
- Winning coach: Rick Samuels (1st title)
- MVP: Kyle Hill (Eastern Illinois)

2000–01 Ohio Valley Conference men's basketball standings
	Conf.				Overall
Team	W		L	PCT	W		L	PCT
Tennessee Tech	13	–	3	.813	20	–	9	.690
Eastern Illinois †	11	–	5	.688	21	–	10	.677
Murray State	11	–	5	.688	17	–	12	.586
Austin Peay	10	–	6	.625	22	–	10	.688
Southeast Missouri State	8	–	8	.500	18	–	12	.600
Tennessee State	7	–	9	.438	10	–	19	.345
Morehead State	6	–	10	.375	12	–	16	.429
Tennessee-Martin	5	–	11	.313	10	–	18	.357
Eastern Kentucky	1	–	15	.063	7	–	19	.269
† 2001 Ohio Valley Tournament winner Rankings from AP Poll

The 2001 Ohio Valley Conference men's basketball tournament was the postseason men's basketball tournament of the Ohio Valley Conference during the 2000–01 NCAA Division I men's basketball season. It was held February 27–March 3, 2001. The first round was hosted by the higher seeded team in each game. The semifinals and finals took place at Gaylord Entertainment Center in Nashville, Tennessee.

Second-seeded Eastern Illinois won the tournament, defeating Austin Peay in the championship game, and received the Ohio Valley's automatic bid to the NCAA tournament. Kyle Hill of Eastern Illinois was named the tournament's most valuable player.

== Format ==
The top eight eligible men's basketball teams in the Ohio Valley Conference receive a berth in the conference tournament. After the regular season, teams were seeded by conference record.

== Bracket ==
Quarterfinals; February 27
1	Tennessee Tech	69
8	UT Martin	58
4	Austin Peay	72
5	Southeast Missouri State	70^{OT}
3	Murray State	114
6	Tennessee State	100
2	Eastern Illinois	102
7	Morehead State	80

Semifinals; March 3
1	Tennessee Tech	63
4	Austin Peay	83
3	Murray State	71
2	Eastern Illinois	97

Finals; March 4
4	Austin Peay	83
2	Eastern Illinois	84
