= 1999–2000 Southeast Missouri State Indians men's basketball team =

American college basketball season

1999–2000 Southeast Missouri State Indians men's basketball

OVC tournament champions

NCAA tournament, first round
- Conference: Ohio Valley Conference
- Record: 24–7 (14–4 OVC)
- Head coach: Gary Garner
- Home arena: Show Me Center

1999–2000 Ohio Valley Conference men's basketball standings
	Conf.				Overall
Team	W		L	PCT	W		L	PCT
Murray State	14	–	4	.778	23	–	9	.719
Southeast Missouri State †	14	–	4	.778	24	–	7	.774
Tennessee Tech	11	–	7	.611	16	–	12	.571
Eastern Illinois	11	–	7	.611	17	–	12	.586
Austin Peay	11	–	7	.611	18	–	10	.643
Middle Tennessee	10	–	8	.556	15	–	13	.536
UT Martin	7	–	11	.389	10	–	19	.345
Tennessee State	6	–	12	.333	7	–	22	.241
Morehead State	4	–	14	.222	9	–	18	.333
Eastern Kentucky	2	–	16	.111	6	–	21	.222
† 2000 Ohio Valley Tournament winner Rankings from AP Poll

The 1999–2000 Southeast Missouri State Indians men's basketball team represented Southeast Missouri State University in the 1999–2000 NCAA Division I men's basketball season. The Indians, led by fifth-year head coach Gary Garner, played their home games at the Show Me Center in Cape Girardeau, Missouri as members of the Ohio Valley Conference. They finished the season 24–7, 14–4 in OVC play to finish in second place. They won the OVC tournament to receive an automatic bid to the NCAA tournament. Southeast Missouri State was the No. 13 seed in the West region and they lost to LSU in the opening round. This was the only time the Indians had participated in the Men's Division I NCAA Tournament until the 2022–23 season.

== Roster ==
1999–2000 Southeast Missouri State Indians men's basketball team
Players
Coaches

Pos.	#	Name	Height	Weight	Year	Hometown
F		Roderick Johnson	6 ft 6 in (1.98 m)	—	Sr
G	12	Michael Stokes	6 ft 0 in (1.83 m)	165 lb (75 kg)	Jr	Emporia, VA
F		Mike Branson	6 ft 6 in (1.98 m)	—	Sr
G	5	Antonio Short	6 ft 2 in (1.88 m)	—	Jr	Louisville, KY
G	3	Amory Sanders Stokes	6 ft 1 in (1.85 m)	180 lb (82 kg)	Jr	Memphis, TN
C	54	Nyah Jones	6 ft 11 in (2.11 m)	230 lb (104 kg)	Jr	Montreal, Canada
G	15	Emmanuel McCuthison Stokes	6 ft 4 in (1.93 m)	180 lb (82 kg)	Jr	Chattanooga, TN
G	11	John Miller Jr	5 ft 11 in (1.8 m)	160 lb (73 kg)	Fr	Fort Wayne, IN
C		Brian Bunche	6 ft 8 in (2.03 m)	—	Sr
F	33	Drew Demond	6 ft 7 in (2.01 m)	215 lb (98 kg)	Fr	Rockton, IL

Head coach

* Gary Garner (Missouri)

Assistant coach(es)

- Keith Pickens (Missouri State)
- Tarrance Crump (Purdue)
- Jason Owens (Siena Heights)

Legend

- (C) Team captain
- (S) Suspended
- (I) Ineligible
- (W) Walk-on
- Injured
- Current redshirt

Roster
Last update: December 3, 2019

== Schedule and results ==
Date time, TV	Rank^{#}	Opponent^{#}	Result	Record	Site (attendance) city, state
Regular season
Nov 19, 1999*		Western Carolina	W 93–69	1–0	Show Me Center; Cape Girardeau, Missouri
Nov 22, 1999*		Rockhurst	W 67–58	2–0	Show Me Center; Cape Girardeau, Missouri
Nov 27, 1999*		Montana	W 66–61	3–0	Show Me Center; Cape Girardeau, Missouri
Dec 2, 1999		at Tennessee Tech	W 84–79	4–0 (1–0)	Eblen Center; Cookeville, Tennessee
Dec 4, 1999*		Oakland City	W 79–45	5–0	Show Me Center; Cape Girardeau, Missouri
Dec 10, 1999*		at Montana	L 48–60	5–1	Dahlberg Arena; Missoula, Montana
Dec 11, 1999*		vs. Robert Morris	W 55–44	6–1	Dahlberg Arena; Missoula, Montana
Dec 18, 1999*		Arkansas State	W 74–71	7–1	Show Me Center; Cape Girardeau, Missouri
Dec 22, 1999*		at Bradley	W 65–60	8–1	Carver Arena; Peoria, Illinois
Jan 2, 2000*		at Southern Illinois	L 51–62	8–2	SIU Arena; Carbondale, Illinois
Jan 6, 2000		Tennessee State	W 79–46	9–2 (2–0)	Show Me Center; Cape Girardeau, Missouri
Jan 8, 2000		Austin Peay	W 62–60	10–2 (3–0)	Show Me Center; Cape Girardeau, Missouri
Jan 10, 2000		at Middle Tennessee	W 61–48	11–2 (4–0)	Murphy Center; Murfreesboro, Tennessee
Jan 13, 2000		at UT Martin	L 66–75	11–3 (4–1)	Skyhawk Arena; Martin, Tennessee
Jan 15, 2000		at Murray State	W 84–78	12–3 (5–1)	Regional Special Events Center; Murray, Kentucky
Jan 18, 2000		Tennessee Tech	W 61–50	13–3 (6–1)	Show Me Center; Cape Girardeau, Missouri
Jan 22, 2000		Eastern Illinois	W 77–66	14–3 (7–1)	Show Me Center; Cape Girardeau, Missouri
Jan 27, 2000		Morehead State	W 80–59	15–3 (8–1)	Show Me Center; Cape Girardeau, Missouri
Feb 26, 2000		at Eastern Kentucky	W 65–48	21–6 (14–4)	McBrayer Arena; Richmond, Kentucky
OVC Tournament
Feb 29, 2000*		UT Martin; Quarterfinals	W 76–74	22–6	Show Me Center; Cape Girardeau, Missouri
Mar 4, 2000*		vs. Middle Tennessee; Semifinals	W 78–60	23–6	Gaylord Entertainment Center; Nashville, Tennessee
Mar 5, 2000*		vs. Murray State; Championship game	W 67–56	24–6	Gaylord Entertainment Center; Nashville, Tennessee
NCAA Tournament
Mar 16, 2000*	(13 W)	vs. (4 W) No. 10 LSU; First Round	L 61–64	24–7	Jon M. Huntsman Center; Salt Lake City, Utah
*Non-conference game. ^{#}Rankings from AP Poll. (#) Tournament seedings in parentheses. W=West. All times are in Central.
