= 1992 Mid-Continent Conference men's basketball tournament =

- Classification: Division I
- Season: 1991–92
- Teams: 8
- Site: CSU Convocation Center; Cleveland, Ohio
- Champions: Eastern Illinois (2nd title)
- Winning coach: Rick Samuels (1st title)
- MVP: Steve Rowe (Eastern Illinois)
- Mid-Continent Conference men's basketball tournaments

1991–92 Mid-Continent Conference men's basketball standings
	Conf.				Overall
Team	W		L	PCT	W		L	PCT
Wisconsin–Green Bay	14	–	2	.875	25	–	5	.833
Akron	10	–	6	.625	16	–	12	.571
Illinois–Chicago	10	–	6	.625	16	–	14	.533
Eastern Illinois †	9	–	7	.563	17	–	14	.548
Wright State	9	–	7	.563	15	–	13	.536
Northern Illinois	7	–	9	.438	11	–	17	.393
Cleveland State	7	–	9	.438	16	–	13	.552
Western Illinois	4	–	12	.250	10	–	18	.357
Valparaiso	2	–	14	.125	5	–	22	.185
† 1992 Mid-Con Tournament winner

The 1992 Mid-Continent Conference men's basketball tournament was held March 8–10, 1992 at the CSU Convocation Center in Cleveland, Ohio.^{[2]} This was the ninth edition of the tournament for the Association of Mid-Continent Universities, now known as the Summit League.

== Bracket ==
Quarterfinals; March 8
1	Wisconsin–Green Bay	59
8	Western Illinois	37
4	Eastern Illinois	84
5	Wright State	72
2	Akron	77
7	Cleveland State	80
3	Illinois–Chicago	80
6	Northern Illinois	66

Semifinals; March 9
1	Wisconsin–Green Bay	65
4	Eastern Illinois	75
7	Cleveland State	66
3	Illinois–Chicago	80

Final; March 10
4	Eastern Illinois	83
3	Illinois–Chicago	68
