= 1991–92 Wright State Raiders men's basketball team =

American college basketball season

1991–92 Wright State Raiders men's basketball
- Conference: Mid-Continent Conference
- Record: 15–13 (9–7 Mid-Cont)
- Head coach: Ralph Underhill (14th season)
- Assistant coaches: Jim Brown; Jim Ehler; Jack Butler
- Home arena: Nutter Center

1991–92 Mid-Continent Conference men's basketball standings
	Conf.				Overall
Team	W		L	PCT	W		L	PCT
Wisconsin–Green Bay	14	–	2	.875	25	–	5	.833
Akron	10	–	6	.625	16	–	12	.571
Illinois–Chicago	10	–	6	.625	16	–	14	.533
Eastern Illinois †	9	–	7	.563	17	–	14	.548
Wright State	9	–	7	.563	15	–	13	.536
Northern Illinois	7	–	9	.438	11	–	17	.393
Cleveland State	7	–	9	.438	16	–	13	.552
Western Illinois	4	–	12	.250	10	–	18	.357
Valparaiso	2	–	14	.125	5	–	22	.185
† 1992 Mid-Con Tournament winner

The 1991–92 Wright State Raiders men's basketball team represented Wright State University in the 1991–92 NCAA Division I men's basketball season led by head coach Ralph Underhill.

== Season summary ==
For the 1991–92 season, Wright State joined the Mid-Continent Conference. A fourth-place finish proved they belonged, but the 15 win season proved disappointing. The season was further marred by the suspension of star point guard Mark Woods.

== Roster ==
1991–92 Wright State Raiders men's basketball team
Players
Coaches

Pos.	#	Name	Height	Weight	Year	Previous school	Hometown
G/F	21	Rob Haucke	6 ft 5 in (1.96 m)	195 lb (88 kg)	Sr	Oak Hills	Cincinnati, OH
G	20	Marcus Mumphrey	6 ft 1 in (1.85 m)	185 lb (84 kg)	Sr	Carroll County	Carrollton, KY
F	42	Bill Edwards	6 ft 8 in (2.03 m)	215 lb (98 kg)	Jr	Carlisle	Middletown, OH
F/C	41	Mike Haley II	6 ft 9 in (2.06 m)	220 lb (100 kg)	Jr	Dunbar	Dayton, OH
F	33	Sean Hammonds	6 ft 5 in (1.96 m)	220 lb (100 kg)	Jr	Pleasure Ridge Park	Louisville, KY
G	24	Renaldo O'Neal	6 ft 4 in (1.93 m)	190 lb (86 kg)	Jr	Dunbar	Dayton, OH
F	40	Jeff Unverferth	6 ft 7 in (2.01 m)	225 lb (102 kg)	RS Jr	Worthington	Worthington, OH
G	23	Scott Blair	6 ft 1 in (1.85 m)	160 lb (73 kg)	So	Westerville North	Westerville, OH
G	30	Andy Holderman	6 ft 1 in (1.85 m)	160 lb (73 kg)	So	Manchester	North Manchester, IN
C	52	Mike Nahar	7 ft 0 in (2.13 m)	208 lb (94 kg)	RS So	Dutch National Jr. Team	Alkmaar
F	43	Dan Skeoch	6 ft 7 in (2.01 m)	210 lb (95 kg)	So	Anderson	Anderson, IN
F	31	Lincoln Bramlage	6 ft 6 in (1.98 m)	185 lb (84 kg)	Fr	Centerville	Centerville, OH
G	25	Chris McGuire	5 ft 11 in (1.8 m)	175 lb (79 kg)	Fr	Chaminade-Julienne	Dayton, OH
F	32	Delme Herriman (redshirt)	6 ft 6 in (1.98 m)	180 lb (82 kg)	Fr	Claymont	Uhrichsville, OH
G	34	Eric Wills	6 ft 2 in (1.88 m)	175 lb (79 kg)	Fr	Chaminade-Julienne	Dayton, OH
G	35	John Ramey	6 ft 3 in (1.91 m)	180 lb (82 kg)	Fr	Western Boone	Thorntown, IN

Head coach

- Ralph Underhill

Assistant coach(es)

- Jim Brown
- Jim Ehler
- Jack Butler

Legend

- (C) Team captain
- (S) Suspended
- (I) Ineligible
- (W) Walk-on
- Injured
- Current redshirt

== Schedule and results ==
Date time, TV	Rank^{#}	Opponent^{#}	Result	Record	Site city, state
Dec 3, 1991*		Bowling Green	W 82–76	1–0	Nutter Center; Fairborn, OH
Dec 6, 1991*		vs. St. Joseph's (PA); Carrier Classic	L 77–87	1–1	Carrier Dome; Syracuse, NY
Dec 7, 1991*		vs. Eastern Kentucky; Carrier Classic	L 63–77	1–2	Carrier Dome; Syracuse, NY
Dec 12, 1991*		Northeastern Illinois	L 82–83	1–3	Nutter Center; Fairborn, OH
Dec 20, 1991*		Central State; USAir Classic	W 112–66	2–3	Nutter Center; Fairborn, OH
Dec 20, 1991*		Alabama State; USAir Classic	W 95–89	3–3	Nutter Center; Fairborn, OH
Dec 30, 1991*		at Youngstown State	W 95–81	4–3	Beeghly Center; Youngstown, OH
Jan 2, 1992*		at Ohio	L 71–87	4–4	Reilly Center; Athens, OH
Jan 4, 1992		at UIC	L 69–92	4–5 (0–1)	UIC Pavilion; Chicago, IL
Jan 8, 1992		Eastern Illinois	W 72–65	5–5 (1–1)	Nutter Center; Fairborn, OH
Jan 11, 1992		at Green Bay	L 44–63	5–6 (1–2)	Brown County Veterans Memorial Arena; Green Bay, WI
Jan 16, 1992		Akron	W 93–68	6–6 (2–2)	Nutter Center; Fairborn, OH
Jan 18, 1992		Valparaiso	W 93–68	7–6 (3–2)	Nutter Center; Fairborn, OH
Jan 20, 1992		at Northern Illinois	W 84–70	8–6 (4–2)	Chick Evans Field House; DeKalb, IL
Jan 25, 1991*		at St. Bonaventure	L 68–71	8–7	Nutter Center; Fairborn, OH
Jan 27, 1992		Cleveland State	L 52–55	8–8 (4–3)	Nutter Center; Fairborn, OH
Jan 30, 1992		Western Illinois	W 94–80	9–8 (5–3)	Nutter Center; Fairborn, OH
Feb 1, 1992		UIC	W 93–82	10–8 (6–3)	Nutter Center; Fairborn, OH
Feb 3, 1992		Valparaiso	W 68–66	11–8 (7–3)	Athletics–Recreation Center; Valparaiso, IN
Feb 5, 1992*		Youngstown State	W 91–73	12–8	Nutter Center; Fairborn, OH
Feb 8, 1992		at Akron	L 86–89	12–9 (7–4)	JAR Arena; Akron, OH
Feb 10, 1992		at Cleveland State	L 67–85	12–10 (7–5)	CSU Convocation Center; Cleveland, OH
Feb 15, 1992		Green Bay	W 80–62	13–10 (8–5)	Nutter Center; Fairborn, OH
Feb 20, 1992		at Eastern Illinois	L 70–79	13–11 (8–6)	Lantz Fieldhouse; Charleston, Illinois
Feb 24, 1992		Northern Illinois	W 78–73	14–11 (9–6)	Nutter Center; Fairborn, OH
Feb 29, 1992		at Western Illinois	L 85–91	15–12 (9–7)	Western Hall; Macomb, IL
Mid-Continent tournament
Mar 8, 1992	(5)	vs. (4) Eastern Illinois; Quarterfinals	L 70–79	15–13	CSU Convocation Center; Cleveland, OH
*Non-conference game. ^{#}Rankings from AP Poll. (#) Tournament seedings in parentheses. MW=Midwest.

== Awards and honors ==
Bill Edwards	MVP
Rob Haucke	Raider Award
Bill Edwards	All-Mid-Continent Conference

== Statistics ==
Number	Name	Games	Average	Points	Assists	Rebounds
42	Bill Edwards	28	20.9	586	65	225
33	Sean Hammonds	27	12.7	343	58	185
20	Marcus Mumphrey	28	11.8	331	42	69
41	Mike Haley II	27	10.7	289	35	101
40	Jeff Unverferth	28	6.9	192	16	117
52	Mike Nahar	25	4.9	123	13	76
30	Andy Holderman	28	4.4	122	46	19
24	Renaldo O'Neal	28	3.2	90	78	48
24	Chris McGuire	27	2.3	62	97	31
43	Dan Skeoch	10	1.9	19	5	12
35	Jon Ramey	14	1.1	15	2	8
34	Eric Wills	13	0.9	12	6	9
23	Scott Blair	8	0.8	6	0	1
21	Rob Haucke	17	0.5	9	8	8
31	Lincoln Bramlage	6	0.3	2	0	2
