= 1992–93 Eastern Illinois Panthers men's basketball team =

American college basketball season

1992–93 Eastern Illinois Panthers men's basketball
- Conference: Mid-Continent Conference
- Record: 10–17 (7–9 Mid-Cont)
- Head coach: Rick Samuels
- Home arena: Lantz Arena

1992–93 Mid-Continent Conference men's basketball standings
	Conf.				Overall
Team	W		L	PCT	W		L	PCT
Cleveland State	15	–	1	.938	22	–	6	.786
Northern Illinois	10	–	6	.625	15	–	12	.556
Wright State †	10	–	6	.625	20	–	10	.667
Illinois–Chicago	9	–	7	.563	17	–	15	.531
Wisconsin–Green Bay	9	–	7	.563	13	–	14	.481
Eastern Illinois	7	–	9	.438	10	–	17	.370
Valparaiso	7	–	9	.438	12	–	16	.429
Western Illinois	4	–	12	.250	7	–	20	.259
Youngstown State	1	–	15	.063	3	–	23	.115
† 1993 Mid-Con Tournament winner Rankings from AP Poll

The 1992–93 Eastern Illinois Panthers men's basketball team represented the Eastern Illinois University during the 1992–93 NCAA Division I men's basketball season. Panthers led by 13th year head coach Rick Samuels and they finished the season with the record of 10–17, 7–9.

Forward Louis Jordan was the team's leading scorer with 14.7 points and Center Darrell Young with 9.2 rebounds. Other statistical leaders included guard Derrick Landrus with 3.3 assists.

== Schedule ==
Date time, TV	Rank^{#}	Opponent^{#}	Result	Record	Site city, state
December 1*		Maine	W 71–63	1–0	Lantz Arena; Charleston, Illinois
December 4*		vs. East Tennessee State	L 49–72	1–1	Mackey Arena; West Lafayette, Indiana
December 5*		vs. Weber State	L 51–61	1–2	Mackey Arena; West Lafayette, Indiana
December 7*		at Indiana State	L 54–74	1–3	Hulman Center; Terre Haute, Indiana
December 10*		Southern Illinois	L 72–85	1–4	Lantz Arena; Charleston, Illinois
December 21*		at Cal State Fullerton	L 60–86	1–5	Titan Gym; Fullerton, California
January 2*		at Nebraska	L 54–70	1–6	Bob Devaney Sports Center; Lincoln, Nebraska
January 7*		Creighton	W 49–45	2–6	Lantz Arena; Charleston, Illinois
January 9		at Cleveland State	L 66–74	2–7 (0–1)	Wolstein Center; Cleveland, Ohio
January 11		at Youngstown State	W 76–75	3–7 (1–1)	Beeghly Center; Youngstown, Ohio
January 13*		Benedictine	W 79–55	4–7 (1–1)	Lantz Arena; Charleston, Illinois
January 16		at Valparaiso	L 76–94	4–8 (1–2)	Athletics-Recreation Center; Valparaiso, IN
January 18		UIC	W 71–57	5–8 (2–2)	Lantz Arena; Charleston, Illinois
January 23		at Wright State	L 80–104	5–9 (2–3)	Nutter Center; Fairborn, Ohio
January 25		Northern Illinois	W 65–63	6–9 (3–3)	Lantz Arena; Charleston, Illinois
January 28		at Western Illinois	L 73–75	6–10 (3–4)	Western Hall; Macomb, Illinois
January 30*		Northeastern Illinois	L 67–70	6–11 (3–4)	Lantz Arena; Charleston, Illinois
February 1		at Wisconsin-Green Bay	L 47–68	6–12 (3–5)	Brown County Arena; Green Bay, WI
February 6		at Northern Illinois	L 56–65	6–13 (3–6)	Chick Evans Field House; DeKalb, Illinois
February 8		Western Illinois	L 73–75	6–14 (3–7)	Lantz Arena; Charleston, Illinois
February 13		Cleveland State	L 75–76	6–15 (3–8)	Lantz Arena; Charleston, Illinois
February 13		Cleveland State	L 75–76	6–15 (3–8)	Lantz Arena; Charleston, Illinois
February 15		Youngstown State	W 82–76	7–15 (4–8)	Lantz Arena; Charleston, Illinois
February 22		Wright State	W 87–80	8–15 (5–8)	Lantz Arena; Charleston, Illinois
February 25		Wisconsin-Green Bay	W 60–52	9–15 (6–8)	Lantz Arena; Charleston, Illinois
February 27		Valparaiso	W 77–76	10–15 (7–8)	Lantz Arena; Charleston, Illinois
March 3		at Illinois-Chicago	L 77–87	10–16 (7–9)	UIC Pavilion; Chicago, Illinois
Mid-Con Tournament
March 7		at Wright State	L 58–94	10–17 (7–9)	Nutter Center; Fairborn, Ohio
*Non-conference game. ^{#}Rankings from AP Poll. (#) Tournament seedings in parentheses.
