= 2000 Ohio Valley Conference men's basketball tournament =

- Classification: Division I
- Season: 1999–00
- Teams: 8
- First round site: Campus Sites
- Semifinals site: Gaylord Entertainment Center; Nashville, Tennessee
- Finals site: Gaylord Entertainment Center; Nashville, Tennessee
- Champions: Southeast Missouri State Redhawks (1st title)
- Winning coach: Gary Garner (1st title)

1999–2000 Ohio Valley Conference men's basketball standings
	Conf.				Overall
Team	W		L	PCT	W		L	PCT
Murray State	14	–	4	.778	23	–	9	.719
Southeast Missouri State †	14	–	4	.778	24	–	7	.774
Tennessee Tech	11	–	7	.611	16	–	12	.571
Eastern Illinois	11	–	7	.611	17	–	12	.586
Austin Peay	11	–	7	.611	18	–	10	.643
Middle Tennessee	10	–	8	.556	15	–	13	.536
UT Martin	7	–	11	.389	10	–	19	.345
Tennessee State	6	–	12	.333	7	–	22	.241
Morehead State	4	–	14	.222	9	–	18	.333
Eastern Kentucky	2	–	16	.111	6	–	21	.222
† 2000 Ohio Valley Tournament winner Rankings from AP Poll

The 2000 Ohio Valley Conference men's basketball tournament was the postseason men's basketball tournament of the Ohio Valley Conference during the 1999–2000 NCAA Division I men's basketball season. It was held February 29 – March 5, 2000. The first round was hosted by the higher seeded team in each game. The semifinals and finals took place at Gaylord Entertainment Center in Nashville, Tennessee. Two seed Southeast Missouri State won the tournament, defeating Murray State in the championship game, and received the Ohio Valley's automatic bid to the NCAA tournament. Southeast Missouri State drew a 13 seed in the West region, facing the 4 seed LSU.

== Format ==
The top eight eligible men's basketball teams in the Ohio Valley Conference receive a berth in the conference tournament. After the 18-game conference season, teams were seeded by conference record. Morehead State and Eastern Kentucky did not participate due to their respective 9th and 10th place conference finishes.

== Bracket ==
Quarterfinals; February 29
1	Murray State	83
8	Tennessee State	58
4	Eastern Illinois	107
5	Austin Peay	100
3	Tennessee Tech	70
6	Middle Tennessee	87
2	Southeast Missouri State	76
7	UT Martin	74

Semifinals; March 4
1	Murray State	89
4	Eastern Illinois	70
6	Middle Tennessee	60
2	Southeast Missouri State	78

Finals; March 5
1	Murray State	56
2	Southeast Missouri State	67
