= 1991–92 Eastern Illinois Panthers men's basketball team =

American college basketball season

1991–92 Eastern Illinois Panthers men's basketball

Mid-Con Conference tournament champions

NCAA tournament
- Conference: Mid-Continent Conference
- Record: 17–14 (9–7 Mid-Cont)
- Head coach: Rick Samuels
- Home arena: Lantz Arena

1991–92 Mid-Continent Conference men's basketball standings
	Conf.				Overall
Team	W		L	PCT	W		L	PCT
Wisconsin–Green Bay	14	–	2	.875	25	–	5	.833
Akron	10	–	6	.625	16	–	12	.571
Illinois–Chicago	10	–	6	.625	16	–	14	.533
Eastern Illinois †	9	–	7	.563	17	–	14	.548
Wright State	9	–	7	.563	15	–	13	.536
Northern Illinois	7	–	9	.438	11	–	17	.393
Cleveland State	7	–	9	.438	16	–	13	.552
Western Illinois	4	–	12	.250	10	–	18	.357
Valparaiso	2	–	14	.125	5	–	22	.185
† 1992 Mid-Con Tournament winner

The 1991–92 Eastern Illinois Panthers men's basketball team represented the Eastern Illinois University during the 1991–92 NCAA Division I men's basketball season. Led by head coach Rick Samuels, they were the champions of the Mid-Continent Basketball tournament to earn the conference's automatic bid in the 1992 NCAA tournament. As the 15 seed in the West region, the Panthers fell to Indiana in the opening round, 94–55.

== Roster ==
1991–92 Eastern Illinois Panthers men's basketball team
Players
Coaches

Pos.	#	Name	Height	Weight	Year	Hometown
G		Steve Rowe	6 ft 1 in (1.85 m)	—	Sr
F		Barry Johnson	6 ft 7 in (2.01 m)	—	Sr
F		Dave Olson (C)	6 ft 6 in (1.98 m)	—	Sr
C		Curtis Leib	6 ft 7 in (2.01 m)	—	So

Head coach

- Rick Samuels

Assistant coach(es)

Legend

- (C) Team captain
- (S) Suspended
- (I) Ineligible
- (W) Walk-on
- Injured
- Current redshirt

Roster

== Schedule and results ==
Date time, TV	Rank^{#}	Opponent^{#}	Result	Record	Site city, state
Regular season
Nov 23, 1991*		Elmhurst	W 59–50	1–0	Lantz Arena; Charleston, Illinois
Nov 25, 1991*		Indiana State	W 59–50	2–0	Lantz Arena; Charleston, Illinois
Nov 30, 1991*		at Northeastern Illinois	W 84–75	3–0	Physical Education Complex; Chicago, Illinois
Dec 5, 1991*		Cal State Fullerton	W 58–57	4–0	Lantz Arena; Charleston, Illinois
Dec 16, 1991*		Northeastern	W 70–66	5–0	Lantz Arena; Charleston, Illinois
Dec 30, 1991*		at No. 13 Missouri	L 56–83	5–1	Hearnes Center; Columbia, Missouri
Jan 2, 1992*		at Creighton	L 60–61	5–2	Omaha Civic Auditorium; Omaha, Nebraska
Jan 4, 1992*		at Nebraska	L 68–81	5–3	Bob Devaney Sports Center; Lincoln, Nebraska
Jan 8, 1992		at Wright State	L 65–72	5–4 (0–1)	Ervin J. Nutter Center; Fairborn, Ohio
Jan 11, 1992		Valparaiso	W 51–46	6–4 (1–1)	Lantz Arena; Charleston, Illinois
Jan 13, 1992		UIC	W 81–76	7–4 (2–1)	Lantz Arena; Charleston, Illinois
Jan 18, 1992		at Cleveland State	W 73–71	8–4 (3–1)	Wolstein Center; Cleveland, Ohio
Jan 20, 1992		at Akron	L 61–71	8–5 (3–2)	James A. Rhodes Arena; Akron, Ohio
Jan 25, 1992		Green Bay	L 70–74	8–6 (3–3)	Lantz Arena; Charleston, Illinois
Jan 27, 1992		Northern Illinois	L 67–76	8–7 (3–4)	Lantz Arena; Charleston, Illinois
Feb 1, 1992		at Western Illinois	W 78–66	9–7 (4–4)	Western Hall; Macomb, Illinois
Feb 3, 1992*		Murray State	L 73–77	9–8	Lantz Arena; Charleston, Illinois
Feb 6, 1992*		at Milwaukee	L 60–78	9–9	Klotsche Center; Milwaukee, Wisconsin
Feb 8, 1992		at UIC	L 67–68	9–10 (4–5)	UIC Pavilion; Chicago, Illinois
Feb 10, 1992		at Valparaiso	W 70–56	10–10 (5–5)	Athletics–Recreation Center; Valparaiso, Indiana
Feb 15, 1992		Akron	W 62–55	11–10 (6–5)	Lantz Arena; Charleston, Illinois
Feb 17, 1992		Cleveland State	L 52–62	11–11 (6–6)	Lantz Arena; Charleston, Illinois
Feb 20, 1992		Wright State	W 79–70	12–11 (7–6)	Lantz Arena; Charleston, Illinois
Feb 22, 1992		at Northern Illinois	W 65–61	13–11 (8–6)	Chick Evans Field House; DeKalb, Illinois
Feb 24, 1992		at Green Bay	L 52–67	13–12 (8–7)	Brown County Arena; Ashwaubenon, Wisconsin
Feb 29, 1992*		at Murray State	L 74–86	13–13	Racer Arena; Murray, Kentucky
Mar 5, 1992		Western Illinois	W 75–73	14–13 (9–7)	Lantz Arena; Charleston, Illinois
Mid-Continent Conference tournament
Mar 8, 1992*	(4)	vs. (5) Wright State; Quarterfinals	W 84–72	15–13	Henry J. Goodman Arena; Cleveland, Ohio
Mar 9, 1992*	(4)	vs. (1) Green Bay; Semifinals	W 75–65	16–13	Henry J. Goodman Arena; Cleveland, Ohio
Mar 10, 1992*	(4)	vs. (3) UIC; Championship Game	W 83–68	17–13	Henry J. Goodman Arena; Cleveland, Ohio
NCAA tournament
Mar 19, 1992*	(15 W)	vs. (2 W) No. 5 Indiana; First Round	L 55–94	17–14	BSU Pavilion; Boise, Idaho
*Non-conference game. ^{#}Rankings from AP poll. (#) Tournament seedings in parentheses. W=West.
