= 1992–93 Wright State Raiders men's basketball team =

American college basketball season

1992–93 Wright State Raiders men's basketball

Mid-Con tournament champions

NCAA tournament, first round
- Conference: Mid-Continent Conference
- Record: 20–10 (10–6 Mid-Con)
- Head coach: Ralph Underhill (15th season)
- Assistant coaches: Jim Brown; Jack Butler; Jim Ehler
- Home arena: Nutter Center

1992–93 Mid-Continent Conference men's basketball standings
	Conf.				Overall
Team	W		L	PCT	W		L	PCT
Cleveland State	15	–	1	.938	22	–	6	.786
Northern Illinois	10	–	6	.625	15	–	12	.556
Wright State †	10	–	6	.625	20	–	10	.667
Illinois–Chicago	9	–	7	.563	17	–	15	.531
Wisconsin–Green Bay	9	–	7	.563	13	–	14	.481
Eastern Illinois	7	–	9	.438	10	–	17	.370
Valparaiso	7	–	9	.438	12	–	16	.429
Western Illinois	4	–	12	.250	7	–	20	.259
Youngstown State	1	–	15	.063	3	–	23	.115
† 1993 Mid-Con Tournament winner Rankings from AP Poll

The 1992–93 Wright State Raiders men's basketball team represented Wright State University in the 1992–93 NCAA Division I men's basketball season. The Raiders, led by head coach Ralph Underhill, played their home games at the Nutter Center in Dayton, Ohio, as members of the Mid-Continent Conference. The Raiders finished tied for second in regular season standings, and won the Mid-Con tournament title to earn an automatic bid to the NCAA tournament – the first NCAA Tournament berth in school history – as the No. 16 seed in the Midwest region. Wright State was beaten by No. 1 seed Indiana in the opening round, 97–54.

== Roster ==
1992–93 Wright State Raiders men's basketball team
Players
Coaches

Pos.	#	Name	Height	Weight	Year	Hometown
F	42	Bill Edwards	6 ft 8 in (2.03 m)	210 lb (95 kg)	Sr	Middletown, Ohio
C	52	Mike Nahar	7 ft 0 in (2.13 m)	250 lb (113 kg)	Jr	Alkmaar
G	22	Mark Woods	6 ft 1 in (1.85 m)	175 lb (79 kg)	Sr	Louisville, Kentucky
G	30	Andy Holderman	6 ft 1 in (1.85 m)	160 lb (73 kg)	Jr	North Manchester, Indiana
F	32	Delme Herriman	6 ft 7 in (2.01 m)	190 lb (86 kg)	Fr	Manchester, England
F	40	Jeff Unverferth	6 ft 7 in (2.01 m)	225 lb (102 kg)	Sr	Worthington, Ohio
F	44	Jason Smith	6 ft 7 in (2.01 m)	225 lb (102 kg)	Fr	Cincinnati, Ohio
F	43	Dan Skeoch	6 ft 7 in (2.01 m)	210 lb (95 kg)	Jr	Anderson, IN
G	35	Jon Ramey	6 ft 3 in (1.91 m)	180 lb (82 kg)	So	Thorntown, IN
G	24	Renaldo O'Neal	6 ft 4 in (1.93 m)	190 lb (86 kg)	Sr	Dayton, Ohio
G	25	Chris McGuire	5 ft 11 in (1.8 m)	175 lb (79 kg)	So	Dayton, Ohio
F	33	Sean Hammonds	6 ft 5 in (1.96 m)	220 lb (100 kg)	Sr	Louisville, Kentucky
G	34	Eric Wills	6 ft 2 in (1.88 m)	170 lb (77 kg)	So	Dayton, Ohio
G	23	Scott Blair	6 ft 1 in (1.85 m)	160 lb (73 kg)	Jr	Westerville, Ohio

Head coach

- Ralph Underhill (Tennessee Tech)

Assistant coach(es)

Jim Brown, Jack Butler, Jim Ehler

Legend

- (C) Team captain
- (S) Suspended
- (I) Ineligible
- (W) Walk-on
- Injured
- Current redshirt

== Schedule and results ==
Date time, TV	Rank^{#}	Opponent^{#}	Result	Record	Site city, state
Regular season
Dec 2, 1992*		at No. 5 Kentucky	L 65–81	0–1	Rupp Arena (23,953); Lexington, Kentucky
Dec 5, 1992*		Wilmington	W 112-53	1–1	Nutter Center (5,449); Fairborn, Ohio
Dec 8, 1992*		Morehead State	W 102–74	2–1	Ervin J. Nutter Center (6,079); Fairborn, Ohio
Dec 11, 1992*		Prairie View A&M	W 112–87	3–1	Nutter Center (6,068); Fairborn, Ohio
Dec 12, 1992*		Eastern Kentucky	W 88–78	4–1	Nutter Center (6,957); Fairborn, Ohio
Dec 16, 1992*		at Ohio State	L 55–76	4–2	St. John Arena (13,276); Columbus, Ohio
Dec 21, 1992*		at Ohio	W 80–77	5–2	Convocation Center (2,347); Athens, Ohio
Dec 30, 1992*		Miami Ohio	L 68–75	5–3	Nutter Center (9,601); Dayton, Ohio
Jan 2, 1993*		at Morehead State	W 129–63	6–3	Ellis T. Johnson Arena (2,175); Morehead, Kentucky
Jan 6, 1993*		Chicago State	W 136–91	7–3	Nutter Center (6,531); Fairborn, Ohio
Jan 9, 1993		at Valparaiso	W 92-78	8–3 (1-0)	Athletics-Recreation Center (2,526); Valparaiso, Indiana
Jan 11, 1993		at UIC	L 82-85	8–4 (1-1)	UIC Pavilion (2,285); Chicago, Illinois
Jan 16, 1993		Western Illinois	W 87-73	9–4 (2-1)	Nutter Center (8,021); Fairborn, Ohio
Jan 23, 1993		Eastern Illinois	W 104-80	10–4 (3-1)	Nutter Center (7,803); Fairborn, Ohio
Jan 25, 1993		Youngstown State	W 100-65	11–4 (4-1)	Nutter Center (6,203); Fairborn, Ohio
Jan 27, 1993		Cleveland State	L 91-99	11–5 (4-2)	Nutter Center (8,017); Fairborn, Ohio
Jan 30, 1993		at Green Bay	W 90-88	12–5 (5-2)	Brown County Veterans Memorial Arena (5,577); Green Bay, WI
Feb 1, 1993		at Northern Illinois	L 77-82	12–6 (5-3)	Chick Evans Field House (1,837); Dekalb, Illinois
Feb 6, 1993		at Youngstown State	W 95-87	13–6 (6-3)	Beeghly Center (2,021); Youngstown, Ohio
Feb 8, 1993		at Cleveland State	L 85-91	13–7 (6-4)	CSU Convocation Center (5,323); Cleveland, Ohio
Feb 13, 1993		UIC	W 96-88 ^{OT}	14–7 (7-4)	Nutter Center (6,011); Fairborn, Ohio
Feb 15, 1993		Valparaiso	W 79-67	15–7 (8-4)	Nutter Center (5,996); Fairborn, Ohio
Feb 18, 1993		Green Bay	L 66-76	15–8 (8-5)	Nutter Center (6,626); Fairborn, Ohio
Feb 20, 1993		Northern Illinois	W 98-56	16–8 (9-5)	Nutter Center (9,279); Fairborn, Ohio
Feb 22, 1993		at Eastern Illinois	L 80-87	16–9 (9-6)	Lantz Arena (1,723); Charleston, Illinois
Feb 27, 1993		Western Illinois	W 81-80	17–9 (10-6)	Western Hall (2,391); Macomb, Illinois
Mid-Con tournament
Mar 7, 1993		Eastern Illinois; Quarterfinals	W 94–58	18–9	Ervin J. Nutter Center (6,162); Fairborn, Ohio
Mar 8, 1993		Valparaiso; Semifinals	W 82–72	19–9	Ervin J. Nutter Center (7,607); Fairborn, Ohio
Mar 9, 1993		UIC; Championship game	W 94–88	20–9	Ervin J. Nutter Center (9,247); Fairborn, Ohio
NCAA tournament
Mar 19, 1993*	(16 MW)	vs. (1 MW) No. 1 Indiana; First Round	L 54–97	20–10	RCA Dome (38,387); Indianapolis, Indiana
*Non-conference game. ^{#}Rankings from AP Poll. (#) Tournament seedings in parentheses. MW=Midwest.

== Awards and honors ==
- Bill Edwards – Mid-Con Player of the Year
- Bill Edwards – MVP
- Bill Edwards – All-Mid-Continent Conference
- Mark Woods – MVP
- Mark Woods – All-Mid-Continent Conference
- Jeff Unverferth – Raider Award

== Statistics ==
Number	Name	GP	GS	Average	Points	Blocks	Steals
42	Bill Edwards	30	30	25.2	757	17	59
52	Mike Nahar	30	30	16.2	486	27	19
22	Mark Woods	30	30	13.8	413	10	109
30	Andy Holderman	30	29	11.2	335	0	39
32	Delme Herriman	29	10	6.6	191	3	25
40	Jeff Unverferth	23	12	4.3	98	5	14
44	Jason Smith	25	1	3.4	85	13	4
43	Dan Skeoch	22	4	3.7	82	4	7
35	Jon Ramey	25	0	3.0	75	1	9
24	Renaldo O'Neal	28	1	2.0	55	1	12
25	Chris McGuire	29	0	1.4	41	0	11
33	Sean Hammonds	3	3	12.3	37	0	5
34	Eric Wills	10	0	1.1	11	0	5
23	Scott Blair	11	0	0.7	8	0	4
