= Robert Curtis (basketball) =

American football and basketball player (1990–2017)

Robert Curtis Jr
Personal information
- Born: January 15, 1990
- Died: May 27, 2017 (aged 27) Victorville, California
- Listed height: 6 ft 9 in (2.06 m)
- Listed weight: 235 lb (107 kg)

Career information
- High school: Capistrano Valley (Mission Viejo, California)
- College: Saddleback College (2008–2010); Wayland Baptist (2010–2012)
- NBA draft: 2012: undrafted
- Playing career: 2012–present
- Position: Point guard
- Number: 38

Career history
- 2012: Saint John Mill Rats
- 2013: Saint John Mill Rats

Robert Curtis, Jr. (January 15, 1990 – May 26, 2017) was an American football and basketball player. He competed with the Saint John Mill Rats of the National Basketball League of Canada (NBL), playing for the team in multiple seasons. Curtis also played with the North County Cobras of the LaBelle Community Football League (LCFL).

== Early life ==
Curtis was born on January 15, 1990, to Robert Curtis, Sr. and Starlea Hall and was brought up in Pomona, California. When Robert, Jr. was 5 years old, his father was shot and killed. Hall was diagnosed with brain cancer at 45 years of age.

== High school career ==
Curtis attended Capistrano Valley High School in Mission Viejo, California. Along with basketball, he played American football in his sophomore year. In his junior season, Curtis was averaging 1.9 points and 2.0 rebounds in 8 games on the varsity team. he saw significant improvement as a senior, averaging 14.5 points and 9.6 rebounds in 26 appearances. Throughout his final season at Capistrano Valley, Oregon State was the sole NCAA Division I program that pursued him. He played with the West Coast All-Stars at the Boo Williams Invitational that season. Following graduation from high school, Curtis made the decision to play prep basketball before joining a college team.

== Collegiate career ==
Curtis played his first two seasons of college basketball with Saddleback College in Mission Viejo, California. The Gauchos played in the California Community College Athletic Association (CCCAA). In 2010, the power forward led the team to a state title. He, along with teammate Tyler McManaman, was named to the all-tournament team. Curtis returned to Saddleback for his sophomore season. After the conclusion of the 2009–10 season, he was recruited by the NCAA Division II team at Cal State Dominguez Hills. However, he sat out for the season. Entering the next season, Curtis joined Wayland Baptist of the National Association of Intercollegiate Athletics (NAIA). He averaged a team-high 13.1 points and 6.8 rebounds. Curtis chose to become professional after his third season at the collegiate level.

== Professional career ==
=== Basketball ===
Over the summer after his final year at Wayland Baptist, Curtis participated in the Southern California Summer Pro League. At the event, he averaged 14.7 points and 8.2 rebounds in 31.8 minutes per game over a total of six games. On August 27, 2012, Curtis was selected by the Windsor Express with the first overall pick in the 2012 NBL Canada draft. He was promptly traded to the Saint John Mill Rats for Mike Helms, the team's fifth overall draft pick, and rights to Isaac Kuon. Mill Rats' general manager Ian McCarthy praised Curtis, "Rob is a young player with tremendous upside. He is ready to prove he was worthy of being the #1 pick and this will be a statement year for him. He is a very mobile big with a good post skillset."

=== Football ===
Curtis had experience playing American football at the semi-professional level. In 2012, he decided to return to the sport, which he had not played since high school. He signed with the North County Cobras of the LaBelle Community Football League (LCFL) as a wide receiver and tight end. The Cobras are based in Vista, California. In his first game, Curtis recorded a touchdown reception against the San Diego Riptide. He said, "I've been feeling football. Football's my first sport, and over the years going through high school my mom didn't want me to play football because of the dangers." He was coached by Tony Vinson, who praised him for his determination.

== Death ==
Curtis was shot and killed outside of a Home Depot in Victorville, California, on May 27, 2017. A person was arrested on Wednesday, May 31 for the shooting.
