= Jay Taylor (basketball) =

American basketball player

Personal information
- Born: October 3, 1967 Aurora, Illinois, U.S.
- Died: July 4, 1998 (aged 30) Aurora, Illinois, U.S.
- Listed height: 6 ft 3 in (1.91 m)
- Listed weight: 190 lb (86 kg)

Career information
- High school: East Aurora (Aurora, Illinois)
- College: Eastern Illinois (1985–1989)
- NBA draft: 1989: undrafted
- Playing career: 1989–1994
- Position: Shooting guard
- Number: 24

Career history
- 1989: New Jersey Nets
- 1989–1990: Wichita Falls Texans
- 1990–1991: Grand Rapids Hoops
- 1991-1992: San Miguel Beermen
- 1992–1993: Rochester Renegade
- 1992–1993: Oklahoma City Cavalry
- 1993–1994: Rockford Lightning
- 1994-1995: Fort Wayne Fury
- 1995: Purefoods TJ Hotdogs

Career highlights
- Mid-Continent Player of the Year (1989); 2× First-team All-Mid-Continent (1988, 1989)
- Stats at NBA.com
- Stats at Basketball Reference

Cornelius F. "Jay" Taylor Jr. (October 3, 1967 – July 4, 1998) was an American professional basketball player.

Taylor, a 6 ft 3 in (1.91 m) guard from East Aurora High School in Aurora, Illinois, played college basketball for the Eastern Illinois Panthers. He finished his career with 1,926 points and graduated as EIU's all-time leading scorer (since passed by Henry Domercant). In his senior year, he averaged 23.8 points per game and was named the 1989 The Mid-Continent Conference Player of the Year.

Following his college career, Taylor was not drafted in the 1989 NBA draft. However, he made the New Jersey Nets' roster and stuck with the team until December. He finished the season with the Wichita Falls Texans of the Continental Basketball Association (CBA). He later played overseas in the Philippines for the San Miguel Beermen in 1991 & 1992, and for the Purefoods TJ Hotdogs in 1995. Taylor played for four more years in the CBA – with the Grand Rapids Hoops, Rochester Renegade, Oklahoma City Cavalry and Rockford Lightning.

Taylor died in a house fire on July 4, 1998. He was inducted into the Eastern Illinois University athletic Hall of Fame in 1999.

== Career statistics ==
Legend
| GP | Games played | GS | Games started | MPG | Minutes per game |
| FG% | Field goal percentage | 3P% | 3-point field goal percentage | FT% | Free throw percentage |
| RPG | Rebounds per game | APG | Assists per game | SPG | Steals per game |
| BPG | Blocks per game | PPG | Points per game | **Bold** | Career high |

=== NBA ===
==== Regular season ====
| Year | Team | GP | GS | MPG | FG% | 3P% | FT% | RPG | APG | SPG | BPG | PPG |
|---|---|---|---|---|---|---|---|---|---|---|---|---|
| 1989–90 | New Jersey | 17 | 0 | 6.7 | .404 | .231 | .667 | .6 | .3 | .3 | .2 | 3.0 |
