= 2016–17 Women's British Basketball League season =

2016–17 WBBL season
- League: Women's British Basketball League
- Sport: Basketball
- Teams: 10

Regular Season

WBBL seasons
- ← 2015–16 2017–18 →

The 2016–17 season was the 3rd of the Women's British Basketball League. The league consists of 10 teams from across the United Kingdom.

== Teams ==
Locations of the 2016–17 WBBL teams

The line-up for the 2016-17 season features the following teams:

Team	City	2015-16 Finish
Barking Abbey Crusaders	London	4th
Caledonia Pride	Edinburgh	New team
Cardiff Met Archers	Cardiff	7th
Leicester Riders	Leicester	6th
Manchester Mystics	Manchester	9th
Nottingham Wildcats	Nottingham	1st
Oaklands Wolves	St Albans	New team
Sevenoaks Suns	Sevenoaks	5th
Sheffield Hatters	Sheffield	3rd
Team Northumbria	Newcastle	2nd

== Format ==
WBBL Championship
Each team plays each other once home and once away for a total of 18 games.

WBBL Cup
The two new entrants to the league, Caledonia Pride and Oaklands Wolves were joined in the first round by the two lowest ranked finishers from the 2015-16 season, Manchester Mystics and Cardiff Met Archers. From there, a straight knockout competition was played. The 2016-17 Cup final was won by the Manchester Mystics, who defeated the Nottingham Wildcats 71-60. The final was played at the Barclaycard Arena in Birmingham.

WBBL Trophy
The ten teams are split into two geographical groups, North and South. Each team plays each other once home or away for a total of 4 games. The top 2 teams in each group progress to the semi-finals, where they play for the two final spots. The 2016-17 Trophy final was won by Sevenoaks Suns, who defeated the Leicester Riders 82-67. The final was played at the Emirates Arena in Glasgow.

== Regular season standings ==
Pos	Team	Pld	W	L	GF	GA	GD	Qualification
1	Nottingham Wildcats	18	14	4	1360	1114	+246	League Champions and qualification to playoffs
2	Leicester Riders	18	13	5	1319	1115	+204	Qualification to playoffs
3	Sevenoaks Suns	18	12	6	1281	1098	+183	Qualification to playoffs
4	Manchester Mystics	18	12	6	1356	1208	+148	Qualification to playoffs
5	Sheffield Hatters	18	11	7	1418	1267	+151	Qualification to playoffs
6	Team Northumbria	18	10	8	1248	1148	+100	Qualification to playoffs
7	Barking Abbey Crusaders	18	8	10	1112	1131	−19	Qualification to playoffs
8	Cardiff Met Archers	18	5	13	1033	1461	−428	Qualification to playoffs
9	Caledonia Pride	18	5	13	1056	1304	−248	
10	Oaklands Wolves	18	0	18	1060	1397	−337	

Updated to match(es) played on 28 April 2017. Source: http://basketballscotland.co.uk/league/108959/

== Playoffs ==
=== Quarter-finals ===
29 April 2017

Nottingham Wildcats	vs.	Cardiff Met Archers

29 April 2017

Manchester Mystics	vs.	Sheffield Hatters

30 April 2017

Leicester Riders	vs.	Barking Abbey Crusaders

1 May 2017

Sevenoaks Suns	vs.	Team Northumbria

Preceded by 2015–16 season	WBBL seasons 2016–17	Succeeded by 2017–18 season
