= Don Eddy (basketball) =

American basketball player and coach

Biographical details
- Born: December 16, 1935; Kenova, West Virginia, U.S.
- Died: November 5, 2017 (aged 81); San Antonio, Texas, U.S.

Playing career
- 1955–1958: Southern Miss
- Position: Guard

Coaching career (HC unless noted)
- 1966–1968: East Tennessee State (asst.)
- 1968–1980: Eastern Illinois
- 1981–1986: UTSA

Don R. Eddy (December 16, 1935 – November 5, 2017) was an American college basketball coach, known for his tenure at Eastern Illinois University and as the first head basketball coach for the University of Texas at San Antonio (UTSA).

Eddy played college basketball for Southern Miss. Following his college career, he coached at Southwest High School in Atlanta, then served as an assistant at East Tennessee State. He was hired as head coach at Eastern Illinois in 1968. Eddy coached the Panthers for twelve seasons, compiling a 208–128 record as he guided the program from NCAA Division II to the National Association of Intercollegiate Athletics (NAIA). He led the Panthers to Division II Final Four in 1976 and 1978.

On May 14, 1980, Eddy was announced as the first head coach for UTSA, with the school planning to a field team starting in the 1980–81 season. After compiling a record of 56–54, he resigned following an altercation with a player in a January 26, 1986, game.

After his coaching career, Eddy ran basketball camps in San Antonio and Brenham, Tx. He died on November 5, 2017, at the age of 81.

== Season-by-season results ==
Record table
Season	Team	Overall	Conference	Standing	Postseason
UTSA (1981–1986)
1981-82	UTSA	8-19	—	—	—
1982-83	UTSA	10-17	—	—	—
1983-84	UTSA	20-8	—	—	—
1984-85	UTSA	18–10	—	—	—
1885-86	UTSA	4–14	—	—	—
Total:		{{{overall}}}			
National champion Postseason invitational champion Conference regular season champion Conference regular season and conference tournament champion Division regular season champion Division regular season and conference tournament champion Conference tournament champion
