= Basketball at the 2017 Island Games =

- Dates: June 24 – 30
- Host city: Gotland, Sweden
- Venue: ICA Maxi Arena, Visby
- Level: Senior

Basketball tournament, for the 2017 Island Games, was held at the ICA Maxi Arena, Visby, Gotland, Sweden in June 2017.

== Medal table ==
* Host nation (Gotland)

Rank	Nation	Gold	Silver	Bronze	Total
1	Cayman Islands	1	0	0	1
1	Menorca	1	0	0	1
3	Gibraltar	0	1	0	1
3	Gotland*	0	1	0	1
5	Guernsey	0	0	1	1
5	Saare County	0	0	1	1
Totals (6 entries)		2	2	2	6

== Results ==
Event	Gold	Silver	Bronze
Men’s	Cayman Islands; Omari Corbin; Davion Cotterell; Joshua Dikau; Jorge Ebanks; Juawon Ebanks; Niiakwei General-Vanderpuije; Adam Milburn; Samuel O'Garro; Shaad O'Garro; De'Andre Simpson; Arin Taylor; Jake Whittaker	Gibraltar; Stephen Britto; Sam Buxton; Adam Cassaglia; Timothy Fava; Dylan Gomez; Angel Guerrero Torres; Miguel Ortega Amusco; Carlos Perez; Aaron Turner; Andrew Yeats; Ian Yeats; Thomas Yome	Saare County; Timo Eichfuss; Indrek Kajupank; Tormi Niits; Urmas Oja; Indrek Õunpuu; Mario Paiste; Tauno Selberg; Raigo Sooär; Taavi Tõnus; Janis Vahter; Egert Väinaste; Alvar Väli
Women’s	Menorca; Xènia Casasayas Correro; Pilar Comella Pons; Andrea Fernandez Pulido; Emily Jane Kelly; Laia Melià Sintes; Serena Mirat Soler; Carla Oliver Sintes; Lorena Orfila Mascaró; Elisabet Salat Felip; Charlotte Sosa Berndt	Gotland; Caroline Danielsson; Emma Gustafsson; Tova Ihse; Annie Kjellberg; Josefine Loob; Hanna Munthe Gottberg; Johanna Persson; Johanna Pettersson; Charlotte Sjöberg; Elin Sjöberg; Marie Söderberg; Marlene Wallin	Guernsey; Ieva Babina; Tia Barnett; Gemma Batiste; Katie Cochrane; Katie Daunt; Jenny Dunne; Eden Fabbri; Eleisha Gettings; Emma Hicks; Verona Tomlin; Emma Webb
