= North County Cobras =

American football team in Vista, California

The North County Cobras were a semi-professional football team based in Vista, California, that competed in the LCFL. The team was a member of the Southern Division of the Western Conference. The Cobras were founded in 2004. They are the football team for North County San Diego, hence the name North County Cobras.

== History ==
The team was founded by Tony Vinson, who served as the head coach. Terrence Webster was a co-owner.

In 2009, the Cobras won the Western Conference Championship and the National LCFL Championship.

The Cobras advertised with Oceanside Magazine and Today's Local News. The 2010 season partnered the team with the North County Times and secured a deal with KOCT to broadcast home games on Tuesday and Thursdays during prime time at 6p.m. Founded by Tony Vinson team owner who is also the head coach, co-owner Terrence Webster.

== Uniforms ==
The uniforms were copper, black and white. The Cobras had two team logos, one of a cobra with the team name and one with the team's football helmet.

== Seasons ==
Season records
| Season | W | L | T | Finish | Playoff results |
|---|---|---|---|---|---|
North County Cobras (LCFL)
| 2009 | 12 | 1 | 0 | 1st LCFL WEST - South Division/ LCFL West Champion / LCFL National Champion | |
| Totals | 12 | 1 | 0 | (including only LCFL) | |
