= Gary Garner =

American college basketball coach

Biographical details
- Born: September 12, 1943 (age 83)

Playing career
- 1962–1965: Missouri
- Position: Guard

Coaching career (HC unless noted)
- 1967–1971: Kemper Military Academy
- 1971–1976: Trenton JC
- 1976–1977: Joplin JC
- 1977–1981: Missouri (assistant)
- 1981–1988: Drake
- 1988–1989: Tulsa (assistant)
- 1991–1997: Fort Hays State
- 1997–2006: Southeast Missouri State
- 2006–2008: Iowa Energy (assistant)
- 2009–2023: Dakota State

Head coaching record
- Overall: 562–508 (.525)

Accomplishments and honors

Championships
- NCAA Division II tournament (1996); OVC regular season (2000); OVC tournament (2000); 3 RMAC regular season (1992, 1996, 1997); 4 RMAC tournament (1994–1997); 2 NSAA regular season (2015, 2016); 2 NSAA tournament (2015, 2016)

Awards
- NABC Division II Coach of the Year (1996); MVC Coach of the Year (1982); OVC Coach of the Year (1999); RMAC Coach of the Year (1996); NSAA Coach of the Year (2016)

Gary Garner (born September 12, 1943) is an American former college basketball coach. He led several programs, including Drake and Southeast Missouri State at the NCAA Division I level. Garner also coached at Fort Hays State and Dakota State, winning a Division II national championship with Fort Hays in 1996.

Raised in West Plains, Missouri, Garner played college basketball for the Missouri Tigers from 1962 to 1965. Following his playing career, he turned to coaching, leading junior college programs at Kemper Military Academy, Trenton Junior College and Joplin Junior College (now Missouri Southern State University) before accepting an assistant coach role at his alma mater under coach Norm Stewart. He spent four seasons on the Tiger staff, helping to build some of the program's best teams, before landing the head coaching position at Drake.

Garner led Drake to the 1986 National Invitation Tournament, where the Bulldogs lost to Marquette, 79-59, in the first round. He departed Des Moines after two additional seasons, including a 14-14 mark in his final campaign in 1987-1988.

After serving as an assistant at Tulsa for one season and then taking a year away from collegiate coaching, Garner was hired as head coach of Division II Fort Hays State ahead of the 1991-1992 season. Garner led the Tigers for six seasons, winning a national championship in 1996 and concluding with a two-loss campaign in 1996-1997.

He returned to the Division I head coaching ranks with Southeast Missouri State (SEMO) for the 1997-1998 season. In his third year, he led the Indians to their first-ever March Madness appearance. After a 21-win regular season and share of the regular-season conference title, SEMO defeated top seed and three-time defending Ohio Valley Conference (OVC) champions Murray State in the OVC championship game to clinch the conference's automatic bid. Playing as a #13 seed in the NCAA Tournament, SEMO led #4 LSU with five minutes remaining, but LSU hit a go-ahead three pointer to break a 61-61 tie with 17.8 seconds left, defeating the Indians, 64-61. Garner was quoted post-game: "All we asked for is to have a chance to win at the end. We had a chance."

Following his departure from SEMO in 2006, Garner spent two seasons as an assistant for Nick Nurse with the Iowa Energy of the NBA G League. Determining that he enjoyed coaching college players more than professionals, Garner accepted the head coaching role at Dakota State University of the National Association of Intercollegiate Athletics (NAIA), where he coached for 14 seasons less a short break to be treated for cancer. Taking over a relatively pedestrian program, he led the school to two regular season and two conference tournament titles in the North Star Athletic Association (NSAA). He led the Trojans to four national tournament appearances in a five-year span. Garner retired following the 2022–23 season.

Garner has a career record of 562–508.
