= UTSA Roadrunners men's basketball =

2025–26 UTSA Roadrunners men's basketball team
- University: University of Texas at San Antonio
- First season: 1981; 45 years ago
- Head coach: Nick Bowman (interim)
- Location: San Antonio, Texas
- Arena: Convocation Center (capacity: 2,650)
- Conference: American
- Nickname: Roadrunners
- Colors: Navy blue, orange, and white
- All-time record: 444–411 (.519)

NCAA Division I tournament appearances
- 1988, 1999, 2004, 2011

Conference tournament champions
- 1988, 1999, 2004, 2011

Conference regular-season champions
- 1991, 1992, 2004

Uniforms
Home	Away

The UTSA Roadrunners men's basketball team represents the University of Texas at San Antonio in San Antonio, Texas, US in NCAA Division I as a member of the American Conference (Note: Known as the American Athletic Conference before July 2025.) (American) from the 2023–24 season. Originally competing as an NCAA independent in 1981–82, the Roadrunners moved to the Trans-America Athletic Conference (now known as the Atlantic Sun Conference, or ASUN) in 1986–87, then moved to the Southland Conference in 1991–92, then moved to the Western Athletic Conference in 2012–2013, then moved to Conference USA in 2013–2014 where they remained for the next 10 seasons. UTSA plays its home games at the on-campus Convocation Center, and is led by interim head coach Nick Bowman.

UTSA has won four conference tournaments and three conference regular season championships. The team has made a total of four NCAA Division I men's basketball tournament appearances in its history, most recently in 2011.

In the 2011 NCAA Division I men's basketball tournament, the Roadrunners defeated SWAC Champion Alabama State, 70–61 in the opening round before falling in the second round to Ohio State. The victory over Alabama State marked the first time in school history that a Roadrunner team won an NCAA tournament game in any sport.

== History ==
=== Don Eddy (1981–1986) ===
On May 14, 1980, Don Eddy was announced as the first head coach for UTSA, with the school planning to a field team starting in the 1980–81 season. After compiling a record of 56–54, he resigned following an altercation with a player in a January 26, 1986 game. After his resignation, former Baylor basketball player Larry Gatewood closed out the season as interim head coach.

=== Ken Burmeister (1986–1990) ===
The Roadrunners moved to the Trans-America Athletic Conference for the 1986–87 season. Ken Burmeister coached the roadrunners from 1986 to 1990 and led the team to its first appearance in the NCAA Tournament in 1988, where they lost to Illinois in the first round.

=== Stu Starner (1990–1995) ===
Stu Starner spent five seasons coaching the Roadrunners, Starner resigned in 1995 with an 84–58 record at the school. His teams won conference regular season championships in 1991 and 1992.

=== Tim Carter (1995–2006) ===
Tim Carter was hired as the head coach for the Roadrunners, where he is the all-time winningest coach in the university's history.

=== Brooks Thompson (2006–2016) ===
On April 19, 2006, Thompson was named head coach of the Roadrunners. On November 15, 2009, UTSA defeated the University of Iowa, UTSA's first ever win versus a Big Ten Conference school. On March 16, 2011, Thompson guided UTSA to the school's first ever NCAA Tournament win when the Roadrunners defeated Alabama State 70–61.

=== Steve Henson (2016–2024) ===
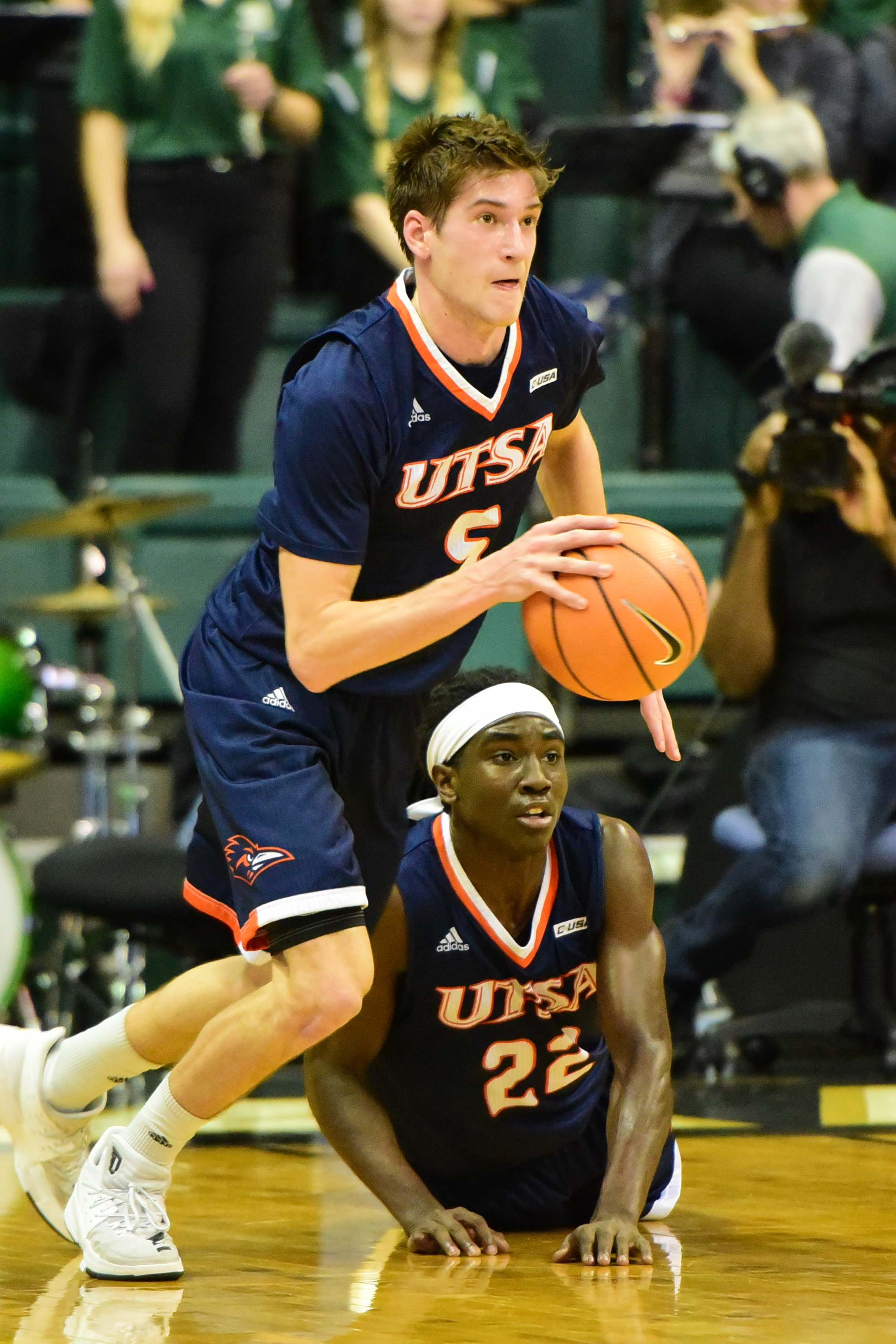
Roadrunners basketball players during a game in 2018

In his first year of coaching, Henson engaged in a major rebuilding effort after succeeding Thompson as head coach. In his first year, UTSA posted a nine-win improvement in the overall record, going to 14–19 and a five-win improvement in Conference USA conference games to 8–10. In his second season, Henson posted a winning record for the first time since 2011–12, going 20–15 for the season and 11–7 in conference play, and being named the conference coach of the year. The UTSA Roadrunners lost in the quarterfinals of the 2018 C-USA tournament, but secured an invite into the 2018 CIT tournament.

On March 14, 2024, UTSA announced that Henson's contract would not be renewed. The Roadrunners' record was 110–144 over his eight-season tenure.

=== Austin Claunch (2024–present) ===
Austin Claunch was named the seventh head coach in program history on March 17, 2024.

== Seasonal record ==
Record table
Season	Coach	Overall	Conference	Standing	Postseason
NCAA independent (1981–1986)
1981-82	Don Eddy	8-19	—	—	—
1982-83	Don Eddy	10-17	—	—	—
1983-84	Don Eddy	20-8	—	—	—
1984-85	Don Eddy	18–10	—	—	—
1985-86	Don Eddy; Larry Gatewood	7–24^{[Note A]}	—	—	—
(Trans-America Athletic Conference) (1986–1990)
1986–87	Ken Burmeister	13–15	7–11	6th	
1987–88	Ken Burmeister	22–9	13–5	3rd	NCAA Division I First Round
1988–89	Ken Burmeister	15–13	8–10	7th	
1989–90	Ken Burmeister	22–7	13–3	2nd	
1990-91	Stu Starner	21-8	12-2	1st	
(Southland Conference) (1991–2012)
1991-92	Stu Starner	21-8	15-3	1st	
1992-93	Stu Starner	15-14	10-8	3rd	
1993-94	Stu Starner	12-15	8-10	6th	
1994-95	Stu Starner	15-13	11-7	2nd	
1995-96	Tim Carter	14-14	12-6	2nd	
1996-97	Tim Carter	9-17	4-12	9th	
1997-98	Tim Carter	16-11	10-6	2nd	
1998-99	Tim Carter	18–11	12-6	2nd	NCAA Division I First Round
1999-00	Tim Carter	15-13	12-6	3rd	
2000-01	Tim Carter	14-15	12-8	2nd	
2001-02	Tim Carter	19-10	13-7	3rd	
2002-03	Tim Carter	10-17	7-13	9th	
2003-04	Tim Carter	19-14	11-5	1st	NCAA Division I First Round
2004-05	Tim Carter	15-13	10-6	4th	
2005-06	Tim Carter	11-17	6-10	8th	
2006-07	Brooks Thompson	7–22	3–13	6th (West)	
2007–08	Brooks Thompson	13–17	7–9	T–3rd (West)	
2008–09	Brooks Thompson	17–12	8–8	4th (West)	
2009–10	Brooks Thompson	19–11	9–7	T–3rd (West)	
2010–11	Brooks Thompson	20–14	9–7	T–3rd (West)	NCAA Division I Round of 64
2011–12	Brooks Thompson	18–14	10–6	3rd (West)	
(Western Athletic Conference) (2012–2013)
2012–13	Brooks Thompson	9–21	3–14	T–8th	
(Conference USA) (2013–2023)
2013–14	Brooks Thompson	8–22	4–12	T–14th	
2014–15	Brooks Thompson	14–16	8–10	T–7th	
2015–16	Brooks Thompson	5–27	3–15	14th	
2016–17	Steve Henson	14–19	8–10	9th	
2017–18	Steve Henson	20–15	11–7	5th	CIT Quarterfinals
2018–19	Steve Henson	17–15	11–7	T–2nd	Declined
2019–20	Steve Henson	13–19	7–11	10th	
2020–21	Steve Henson	15–11	9–7	4th (West)	Declined
2021–22	Steve Henson	10-22	3-15	6th (West)	
2022–23	Steve Henson	10–22	4–16	11th	
(American Athletic/American Conference) (2023–present)
2023–24	Steve Henson	11-21	5-13	13th	
Total:		444–411			
National champion Postseason invitational champion Conference regular season champion Conference regular season and conference tournament champion Division regular season champion Division regular season and conference tournament champion Conference tournament champion

^A. Don Eddy went 4–14 and Larry Gatewood went 3-10 as head coaches, respectively.

== Postseason history ==
=== NCAA tournament results ===
The Roadrunners have appeared in four NCAA Tournaments. Their combined record is 1–4.

Year	Round	Opponent	Result
1988	First Round	Illinois	L 72–81
1999	First Round	Connecticut	L 66–91
2004	First Round	Stanford	L 45–71
2011	First Four; First Round	Alabama State; Ohio State	W 70–61; L 46–75

=== CIT results ===
The Roadrunners have appeared in the CollegeInsider.com Postseason Tournament (CIT) one time. Their record is 1–1.

Year	Round	Opponent	Result
2018	First Round; Quarterfinals	Lamar; Sam Houston State	W 76–69; L 69–76

== Notable players ==
=== Retired jerseys ===
UTSA has retired two jerseys in program history. Also even though the jerseys are retired, the numbers are still available so current and future players can use them.

UTSA Roadrunners retired jerseys
No.	Player	Years	Jer. ret.	Ref.
23	Devin Brown	1998–2002		
30	Derrick Gervin	1981–1985	2006	
