= Henry Domercant =

American basketball player (born 1980)

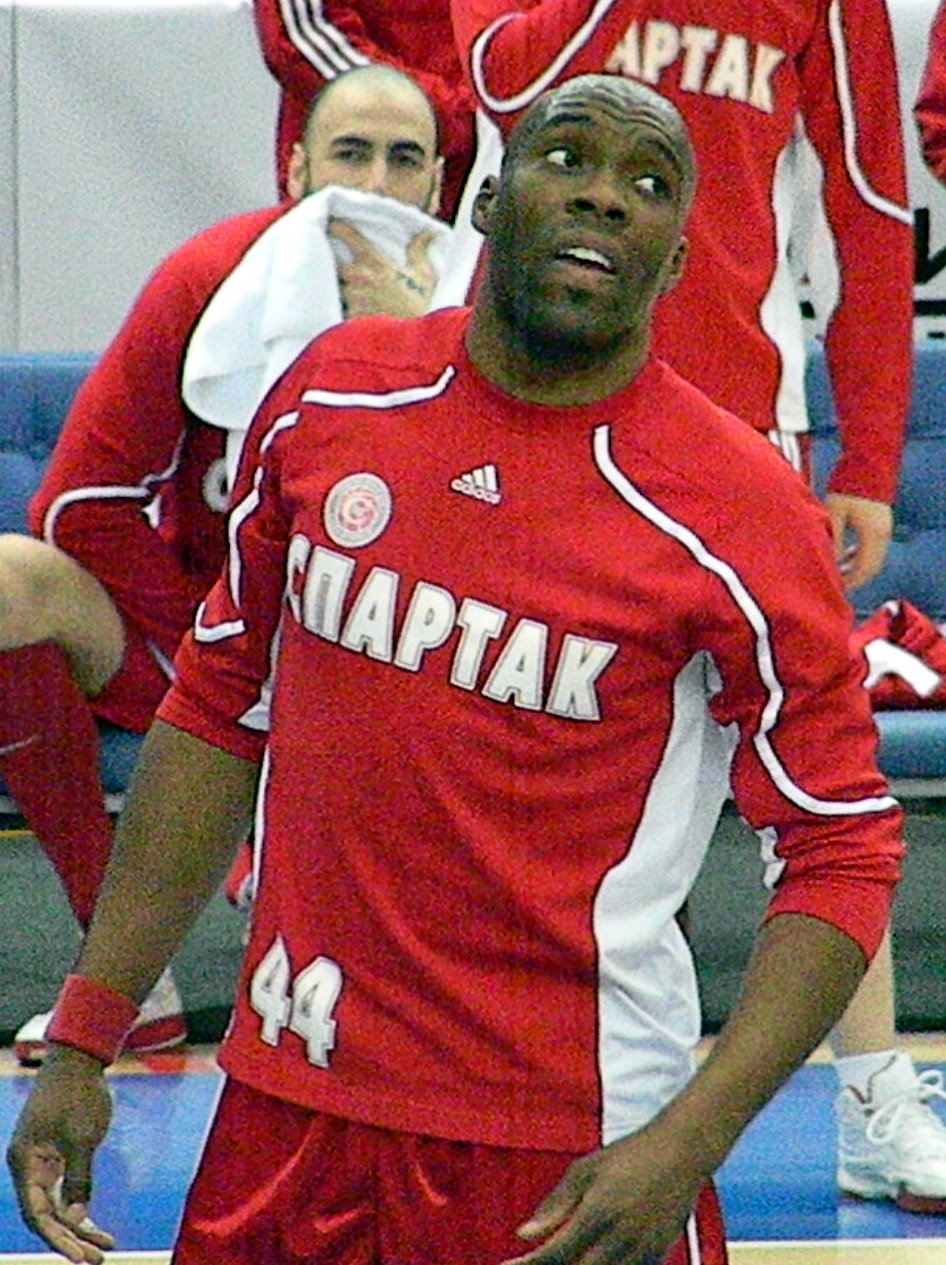
- Domercant while playing with Spartak Saint Petersburg

Chicago Bulls
- Title: Assistant coach
- League: NBA

Personal information
- Born: December 30, 1980 (age 45) Chicago, Illinois, U.S.
- Listed height: 6 ft 5 in (1.96 m)
- Listed weight: 210 lb (95 kg)

Career information
- High school: Naperville North (Naperville, Illinois)
- College: Eastern Illinois (1999–2003)
- NBA draft: 2003: undrafted
- Playing career: 2003–2017
- Position: Shooting guard
- Number: 44

Career history

Playing
- 2003–2004: Pınar Karşıyaka
- 2004–2006: Efes Pilsen
- 2006–2007: Olympiacos
- 2007–2008: Dynamo Moscow
- 2008–2010: Montepaschi Siena
- 2010–2011: Spartak Saint Petersburg
- 2011–2012: UNICS Kazan
- 2012–2014: Galatasaray Liv Hospital
- 2015: Juvecaserta Basket
- 2016: Idaho Stampede

Coaching
- 2017–2018: Maine Red Claws (assistant)
- 2018–2020: Windy City Bulls (assistant)
- 2021–2024: Windy City Bulls
- 2024–present: Chicago Bulls (assistant)

Career highlights
- All-EuroLeague Second Team (2012); Russian Cup winner (2011); All-RPBL Symbolic First Team (2011); Russian RPBL All-Star (2011); 2× Italian League champion (2009, 2010); 2× Italian Cup winner (2009, 2010); 2× Italian Supercup winner (2008, 2009); Turkish Cup winner (2006); Turkish League champion (2005); 2× Turkish League All-Star (2005, 2006); OVC Player of the Year (2002); 3× First-team All-OVC (2001–2003)

Henry Domercant (born December 30, 1980) is an American-born naturalized Bosnian professional basketball coach and former player currently working as an assistant coach for the Chicago Bulls of the National Basketball Association (NBA). He played college basketball for Eastern Illinois, and was an All-EuroLeague Second Team selection in 2012.

== College career ==
Domercant attended Eastern Illinois, being second in NCAA Division I scoring both in the 2001–02 season averaging 26.4 points as a junior, and again as a senior in 2002–03 with an average of 27.9 per game. He finished with EIU and Ohio Valley Conference records of 2,602 career points in his four college seasons.

== Professional career ==
Domercant was selected in the 2003 Continental Basketball Association (CBA) draft by the Yakima Sun Kings. However, he decided to begin his professional career in Turkey for the 2003–04 season with Pınar Karşıyaka. He moved to Efes Pilsen in 2004 and played two seasons for the club. He departed Turkey following the 2005–06 season and moved to Greece, signing with Olympiacos Piraeus. For the 2007–08 season, he joined Dynamo Moscow.

Between 2008 and 2010, Domercant played in Italy for Montepaschi Siena, winning all three competitions both seasons with the club: Italian Supercup, Italian Cup, and the Italian league championship. For the 2010–11 season, he moved back to Russia where he played for Spartak Saint Petersburg, and then for the 2011–12 season, he continued in Russia playing for UNICS Kazan.

On August 21, 2012, Domercant signed with Galatasaray Liv Hospital. However, in late November, he was ruled out for six months with a knee injury; he appeared in just one game. He returned to Galatasaray for the 2013–14 season, averaging 7.1 points and 1.3 rebounds in 19 league games. He also averaged 4.7 points and 1.2 rebounds in 27 EuroLeague games.

On January 17, 2015, Domercant signed with Juvecaserta Basket of the Italian Lega Basket Serie A. In 12 games for Juvecaserta to finish the 2014–15 season, he averaged 10.9 points and 2.9 rebounds per game.

On February 12, 2016, Domercant was acquired by the Idaho Stampede of the NBA Development League. On February 19, he made his debut for the Stampede in a 99–96 loss to the Grand Rapids Drive, recording three points and one rebound in 11 minutes.

On August 4, 2017, Domercant signed with Romanian club U-BT Cluj-Napoca. On August 24, 2017, he parted ways with U-BT Cluj-Napoca before appearing in a game for them. Domercant left the team with a foot injury.

== National team career ==
In 2005, Domercant began representing the senior Bosnia and Herzegovina national team. He played with Bosnia and Herzegovina at two major FIBA championships, the EuroBasket 2005 and the EuroBasket 2011.

== Coaching career ==
On October 23, 2017, it was reported that Domercant was hired as an assistant coach by the Maine Red Claws, the Boston Celtics' development team in the NBA G League.

In 2018, he was hired as an assistant coach for Windy City Bulls, the Chicago Bulls' G League affiliate. In 2020, he was promoted to the role of player development coordinator following the Bulls' hiring of Billy Donovan as head coach and the Windy City Bulls sitting out the 2020–21 season. He was named the head coach of the Windy City Bulls before the 2021–22 season.

On July 13, 2024, Domercant became an assistant coach for the Chicago Bulls.

== Career statistics ==
Legend
GP	Games played	GS	Games started	MPG	Minutes per game
FG%	Field-goal percentage	3P%	3-point field-goal percentage	FT%	Free-throw percentage
RPG	Rebounds per game	APG	Assists per game	SPG	Steals per game
BPG	Blocks per game	PPG	Points per game	PIR	Performance index rating
**Bold**	Career high

=== EuroLeague ===
*	Led the league

Year	Team	GP	GS	MPG	FG%	3P%	FT%	RPG	APG	SPG	BPG	PPG	PIR
2004–05	Efes	23	**23**	31.7	.450	.457	.786	**4.1**	1.4	1.6	**.1**	14.1	14.2
2005–06	Efes	22	21	**32.0**	.411	.356	.761	3.2	**1.6**	**1.7**	**.1**	12.4	11.5
2006–07	Olympiacos	22	11	24.4	.474	.444	.711	2.1	.5	1.0	**.1**	11.2	8.0
2008–09	Mens Sana	20	15	23.6	.397	.385	**.943**	2.4	1.4	1.0	**.1**	10.1	8.6
2009–10	Mens Sana	16	1	17.2	**.478**	**.509**	.938	1.5	.6	.4	**.1**	10.5	7.1
2011–12	UNICS	19	19	31.9*	.433	.495	.837	3.7	**1.6**	.6	**.1**	**15.5**	**16.3**
2013–14	Galatasaray	**27**	5	13.6	.333	.310	.905	1.2	.4	.6	—	4.7	2.9
Career		149	95	24.8	.427	.422	.822	2.6	1.1	1.0	.1	11.0	9.6
