= Kyle Hill =

American basketball player (born 1979)

Personal information
- Born: April 7, 1979 (age 47) Chicago, Illinois, U.S.
- Listed height: 6 ft 2.75 in (1.90 m)
- Listed weight: 185 lb (84 kg)

Career information
- High school: Argo (Summit, Illinois)
- College: Eastern Illinois (1997–2001)
- NBA draft: 2001: 2nd round, 43rd overall pick
- Drafted by: Dallas Mavericks
- Playing career: 2001–2012
- Position: Point guard / shooting guard

Career history
- 2001–2002: ASVEL
- 2002–2003: Pau-Orthez
- 2003: AEK Athens
- 2003–2004: Lauretana Biella
- 2004–2005: Zadar
- 2005–2006: Snaidero Udine
- 2006: Girona
- 2007: Bosna
- 2008: Snaidero Udine
- 2008–2010: Lucentum Alicante
- 2010: Hemofarm
- 2012: Ourense Baloncesto

Career highlights
- 2× LNB Pro A champion (2002, 2003); French Cup winner (2003); Croatian Cup winner (2005)
- Stats at Basketball Reference

Kyle Eric Hill (born April 7, 1979) is an American retired professional basketball player. He was picked by the Dallas Mavericks in the 2001 NBA draft with the 44th overall draft pick. Hill's NBA rights were then traded by the Mavericks shortly after the draft to the Houston Rockets. Hill ended up never playing in an NBA game and is 1 of 8 players from the 2001 NBA Draft that never played a game in the league.

== High school and college career ==
Hill grew up in a neighborhood of Chicago, where there was once a shooting outside his window. In response to his declining grades and truancy from school, his mother moved him to nearby Justice, Illinois, after his eighth-grade year. Hill attended and played basketball at Argo Community High School in Summit, Illinois, where he averaged 13.8 points, 5.8 assists, 4.8 rebounds, and 2.3 steals per game as a senior and was named the most valuable player of the South Inter-Conference Association North Conference.

He played college basketball at Eastern Illinois University, where he helped lead the Panthers to an appearance in the 2001 NCAA tournament.

== Professional career ==
Hill was selected by the Dallas Mavericks with the 44th pick of the 2001 NBA draft. He immediately went to Europe and signed with the French team ASVEL, where he played in the Euroleague with Nikola Vujčić, where he averaged 13.4 points per game and won the French Cup.

Hill signed with the French club Pau-Orthez, where he recorded 9.5 points per game in 25 minutes per game. He then played briefly with AEK Athens in Greece, and then with Lauretana Biella in Italy during the 2003–04 season. He followed that with an excellent season with the Croatian club KK Zadar.

After Zadar, he moved to the Italian club Snaidero Udine, where he played well and averaged more than 15 points per game during the 2005–06 season. Soon after that he moved to the Spanish team Girona, but an injury that he suffered to his achilles tendon prevented him from playing much. During the 2007–08 season, Hill played five games with KK Bosna from Sarajevo and he then returned to Udine. He finished the season playing with Snaidero Udine, where he formed one half of the same dynamic duo along with Jerome Allen for the team, and was once again coached by Cesare Pancotto, just like in the 2005–06 season.

On March 1, 2010, Hill signed a contract with Hemofarm Vršac from Serbia. In 2012, Hill signed with Aguas de Sousas Ourense of LEB Plata, Spanish third division.

== Coaching career ==
Hill continues to coach in the Atlanta area with the private coaching service, CoachUp.
