= Eastern Illinois Panthers men's basketball =

College basketball team

2026–27 Eastern Illinois Panthers men's basketball team
- University: Eastern Illinois University
- First season: 1908
- Athletic director: Tom Michael
- Head coach: Marty Simmons (6th season)
- Location: Charleston, Illinois
- Arena: Lantz Arena (capacity: 5,300)
- Conference: Ohio Valley Conference
- Nickname: Panthers
- Colors: Blue and gray
- All-time record: 543–662 (.451)

NCAA Division I tournament Final Four
- NCAA Division II; 1976, 1978
Other NCAA Division I tournament results
Elite Eight	NCAA Division II; 1976, 1978
Sweet Sixteen	NCAA Division II; 1976, 1977, 1978, 1980
Appearances	NCAA Division II; 1975, 1976, 1977, 1978, 1979, 1980 NCAA Division I 1992, 2001

Conference tournament champions
- Mid-Cont: 1985, 1992; Ohio Valley Conference: 2001

Conference regular-season champions
- IIAC: 1950, 1951, 1952, 1953, 1954, 1965, 1969

The Eastern Illinois Panthers men's basketball team is the basketball team that represents Eastern Illinois University in Charleston, Illinois, United States. The first basketball team started in 1908–09 season. The school's team currently competes in the Ohio Valley Conference. The Panthers competed in the NCAA Division I tournament in 1992 and 2001.

== Season results ==
Eastern Illinois' records season by season since joining Division I in 1981.

Season	Head Coach	Overall	Conference	Standing	Postseason
Division I Independent
1981–82	Rick Samuels	14–13	0–0	-	–
Mid-Continent Conference
1982–83	Rick Samuels	13–18	8–4	2nd of 8	–
1983–84	Rick Samuels	15–13	7–7	4th of 8	–
1984–85	Rick Samuels	20–10	9–5	3rd of 8	–
1985–86	Rick Samuels	19–13	8–6	3rd of 8	–
1986–87	Rick Samuels	9–19	3–11	7th of 8	–
1987–88	Rick Samuels	17–11	7–7	4th of 8	–
1988–89	Rick Samuels	16–16	7–5	3rd of 8	–
1989–90	Rick Samuels	10–18	3–9	6th of 8	–
1990–91	Rick Samuels	17–12	10–6	T-3rd of 9	–
1991–92	Rick Samuels	17–14	9–7	T-4th of 9	NCAA 1st Round
1992–93	Rick Samuels	10–17	7–9	T-6th of 9	–
1993–94	Rick Samuels	12–15	7–11	T-6th of 10	–
1994–95	Rick Samuels	16–13	10–8	T-4th of 10	–
1995–96	Rick Samuels	13–15	9–9	T-6th of 10	–
Ohio Valley Conference
1996–97	Rick Samuels	12–15	9–9	T-5th of 10	–
1997–98	Rick Samuels	16–11	13–5	2nd of 10	–
1998–99	Rick Samuels	13–16	8–10	T-7th of 10	–
1999–00	Rick Samuels	17–12	11–7	T-3rd of 10	–
2000–01	Rick Samuels	21–10	11–5	T-2nd of 9	NCAA 1st Round
2001–02	Rick Samuels	15–16	7–9	T-5th of 9	–
2002–03	Rick Samuels	14–15	9–7	T-4th of 11	–
2003–04	Rick Samuels	6–21	4–12	T-10th of 11	–
2004–05	Rick Samuels	12–16	7–9	8th of 11	–
2005–06	Mike Miller	6–21	5–15	9th of 11	–
2006–07	Mike Miller	10–20	6–14	10th of 11	–
2007–08	Mike Miller	7–22	6–14	10th of 11	–
2008–09	Mike Miller	12–18	8–10	7th of 10	–
2009–10	Mike Miller	19–12	11–7	T-3rd of 10	–
2010–11	Mike Miller	9–20	4–14	9th of 10	–
2011–12	Mike Miller	12–17	5–11	10th of 11	–
2012–13	Jay Spoonhour	11–21	6–10	3rd West	–
2013–14	Jay Spoonhour	11–19	7–9	3rd West	–
2014–15	Jay Spoonhour	18–15	9–7	3rd West	CIT 2nd Round
2015–16	Jay Spoonhour	13–17	9–7	3rd West	–
2016–17	Jay Spoonhour	14–15	6–10	5th West	–
2017–18	Jay Spoonhour	12–19	7–11	8th of 12	–
2018–19	Jay Spoonhour	14–18	7–11	6th of 12	–
2019–20	Jay Spoonhour	17–15	9–9	T-5th of 12	–
2020–21	Jay Spoonhour	9–18	6–14	T-9th of 12	–
2021–22	Marty Simmons	5–26	3–15	10th of 10	–
2022–23	Marty Simmons	9–22	5–13	10th of 10	–
2023–24	Marty Simmons	14–18	8–10	7th of 11	–
2024–25	Marty Simmons	12–19	8–12	9th of 11	–
2025–26	Marty Simmons	13–20	8–12	T-8th of 11	–
Totals	45 Years; 4 Coaches	591–741 (.444)		0 Conf. Championships	3 Postseason Appearances

== Postseason ==
=== NCAA Division I tournament results ===
The Panthers have appeared in the NCAA Division I tournament two times. Their combined record is 0–2.

Year	Seed	Round	Opponent	Result
1992	#15	First round	#2 Indiana	L 55–94
2001	#15	First round	#2 Arizona	L 76–101

=== NCAA Division II tournament results ===
The Panthers have appeared in the NCAA Division II tournament six times. Their combined record is 10–7.

Year	Round	Opponent	Result
1975	Regional semifinals Regional 3rd-place game	Akron; Youngstown State	L 62–76; L 80–86
1976	Regional semifinals Regional Finals; Elite Eight; Final Four; National 3rd-place game	Saint Joseph's (IN); Evansville; Bridgeport; Chattanooga; Old Dominion	W 65–56; W 75–73; W 81–66; L 84–93; W 78–74
1977	Regional semifinals Regional Finals	Bellarmine; Randolph-Macon	W 87–72; L 66–69
1978	Regional semifinals Regional Finals; Elite Eight; Final Four; National 3rd-place game	Saint Joseph's (IN); Indiana State Evansville; Elizabeth City State; Wisconsin-Green Bay; Florida Tech	W 100–93; W 79–67; W84–71; L 43–58; W 77–67
1979	Regional semifinals Regional 3rd-place game	Saint Joseph's (IN); Northern Michigan	L 66–76; W 65–58
1980	Regional semifinals Regional Finals	Wright State; Northern Michigan	W 74–63; L 56–58

=== NAIA tournament results ===
The Panthers have appeared in the NAIA tournament six times. Their combined record is 7–7.

Year	Round	Opponent	Result
1947	First round	Southeastern Oklahoma State	L 42–53
1949	First round Second Round; Quarterfinals	Miami (FL); San Jose State; Beloit	W 89–73; W 81–75; L 64–65
1950	First round	River Fall State	L 68–80
1952	First round Second Round	Huron; Morningside	W 113–78; L 93–98
1953	First round Second Round	Morris Harvey; Hamline	W 84–67; L 86–88
1957	First round Second Round; Quarterfinals; Semifinals; National 3rd-place game	New Mexico Highlands; Villa Madonna; Hamline; Southeastern Oklahoma State; Pacific Lutheran	W 88–76; W 110–78; W 88–83; L 81–95; L 85–87

=== CIT results ===
The Panthers have appeared in the CollegeInsider.com Postseason Tournament (CIT) one time. Their record is 1–1.

Year	Round	Opponent	Result
2015	First round Second Round	Oakland; Evansville	W 97–91; L 68–83

== Retired Numbers ==
No.	Player	Position	Career	Date of Retirement
00	Kevin Duckworth	C	1983–86	September 14, 1991
44	Henry Domercant	SG	2000–03	February 16, 2013

== Notable former players ==
- Jon Collins, EIU Hall of Fame 1993
- Henry Domercant, former professional basketball player in Europe
- Kevin Duckworth, former NBA all-star center
- Kyle Hill, former professional basketball player
- Alfonzo McKinnie, NBA player for the Chicago Bulls
- Jay Taylor, former NBA player for the New Jersey Nets

== See also ==
- NCAA Division I men's basketball tournament bids by school
- List of NCAA Division II men's basketball tournament bids by school
