= List of Senior CLASS Award basketball winners =

Academic award presented to NCAA men's and women's basketball student-athletes

Senior CLASS Award (men's and women's basketball)
- Awarded for: the senior NCAA Division I student athlete of the year in men's and women's basketball
- Country: United States
- Presented by: Premier Sports Management

History
- First award: 2001 (men); 2002 (women)
- Final award: On hiatus as of 2022

The Senior CLASS Award is presented each year to the NCAA Division I student athlete of the year in men's and women's basketball who are seniors. The acronym "CLASS" stands for Celebrating Loyalty and Achievement for Staying in School. According to the award's official website, the recognition "honors the attributes of NCAA Division I senior student-athletes in four areas: community, classroom, character and competition. The award program is designed exclusively for college seniors who are utilizing their complete athletic eligibility, remaining committed to their university and pursuing the many rewards a senior season can bring." NCAA Division I basketball coaches, media members, and fans vote during the selection process.

== History ==
The idea for the award came from legendary sportscaster Dick Enberg. A major storyline throughout the 2000–01 men's basketball season, and during the broadcast of the 2001 championship game, was Duke player's Shane Battier's decision the previous summer to return to school for his senior season, despite being a projected first round NBA draft lottery pick if he had decided to turn pro. Later in 2001, Premier Sports Management announced the formation of the Senior CLASS Award and teamed up with the Kansas City Club to host an annual awards gala. Enberg agreed to serve as honorary chairman of the award and CBS Sports provided broadcast support, announcing the winner each year during the Final Four telecast. Enberg's idea for this award was originally to honor men's basketball seniors but over the ensuing years it expanded to other sports, with women's basketball seniors getting their first awardee one year later.

In September 2022, Premier Sports Management decided to "take a pause" on presenting future Senior CLASS award winners. They had been operating without an official corporate sponsor since 2012–13 and in 2022 decided it was time to look for a new one. Once they have a new sponsor they intend to resume the awards "for years to come."

== Key ==
*	Awarded a national player of the year award that same season: Men – Sporting News; Oscar Robertson Trophy; Associated Press; NABC; UPI; Naismith; Wooden; Adolph Rupp Trophy; Women – Wade; Associated Press; Naismith; Wooden

== Winners ==
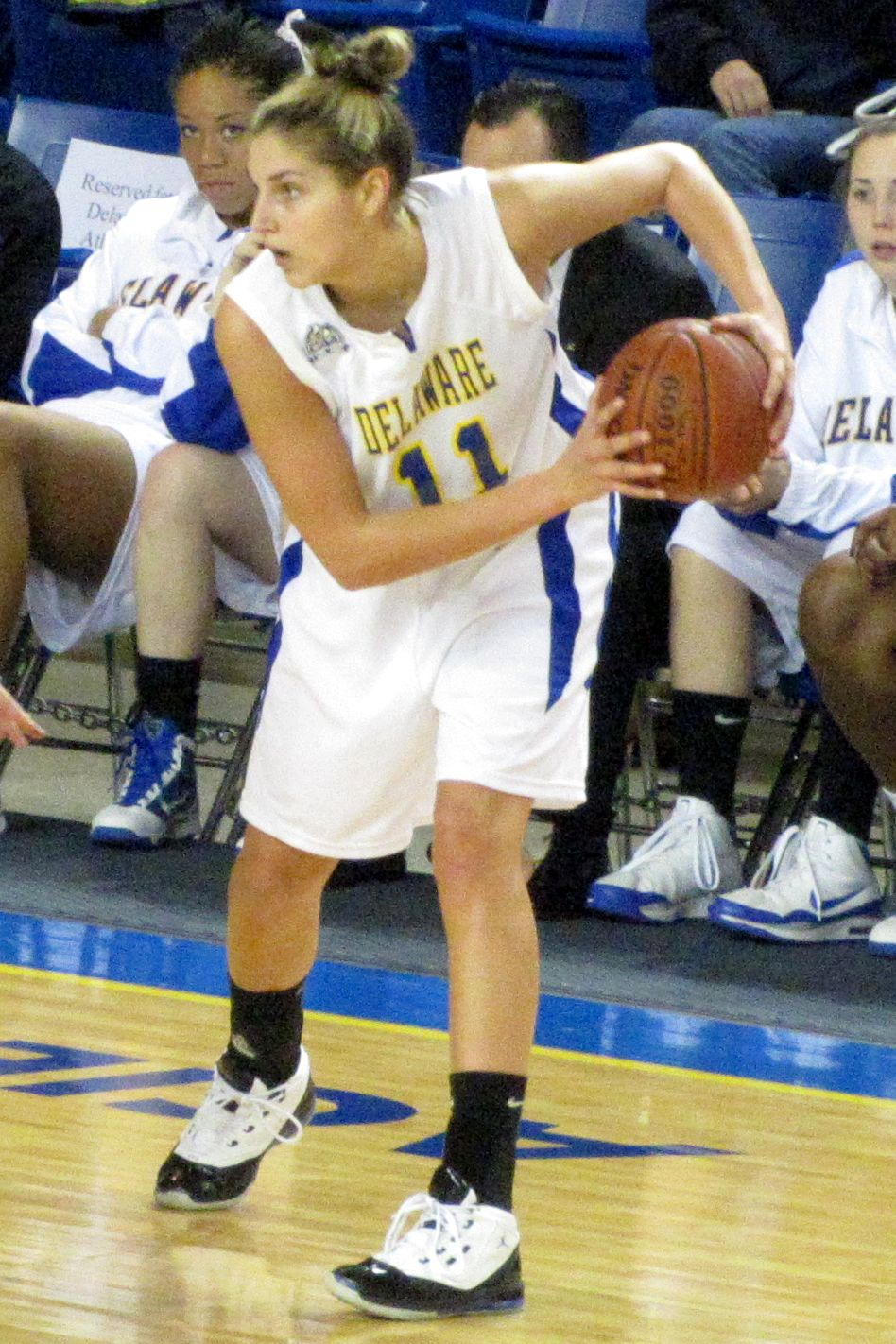
Elena Delle Donne, Delaware, 2013

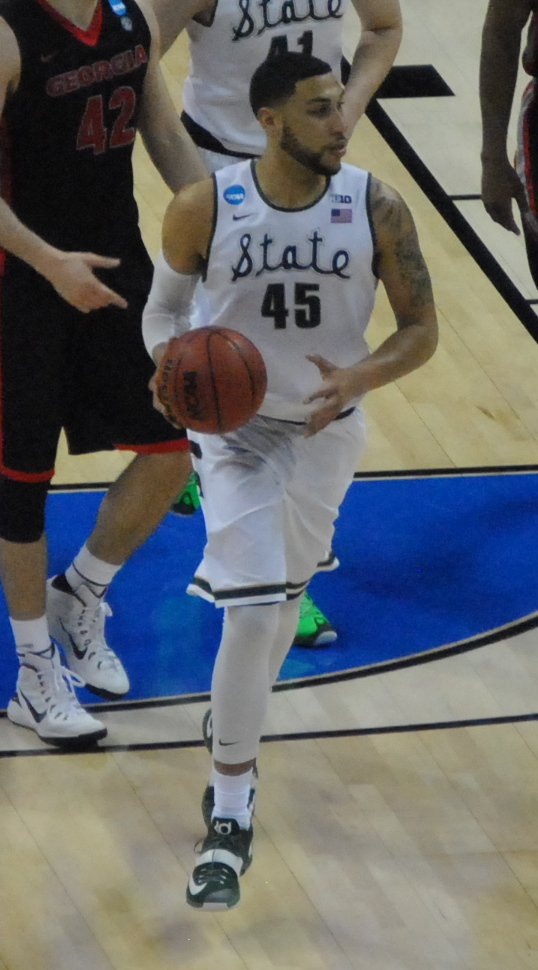
Denzel Valentine, Michigan State, 2016

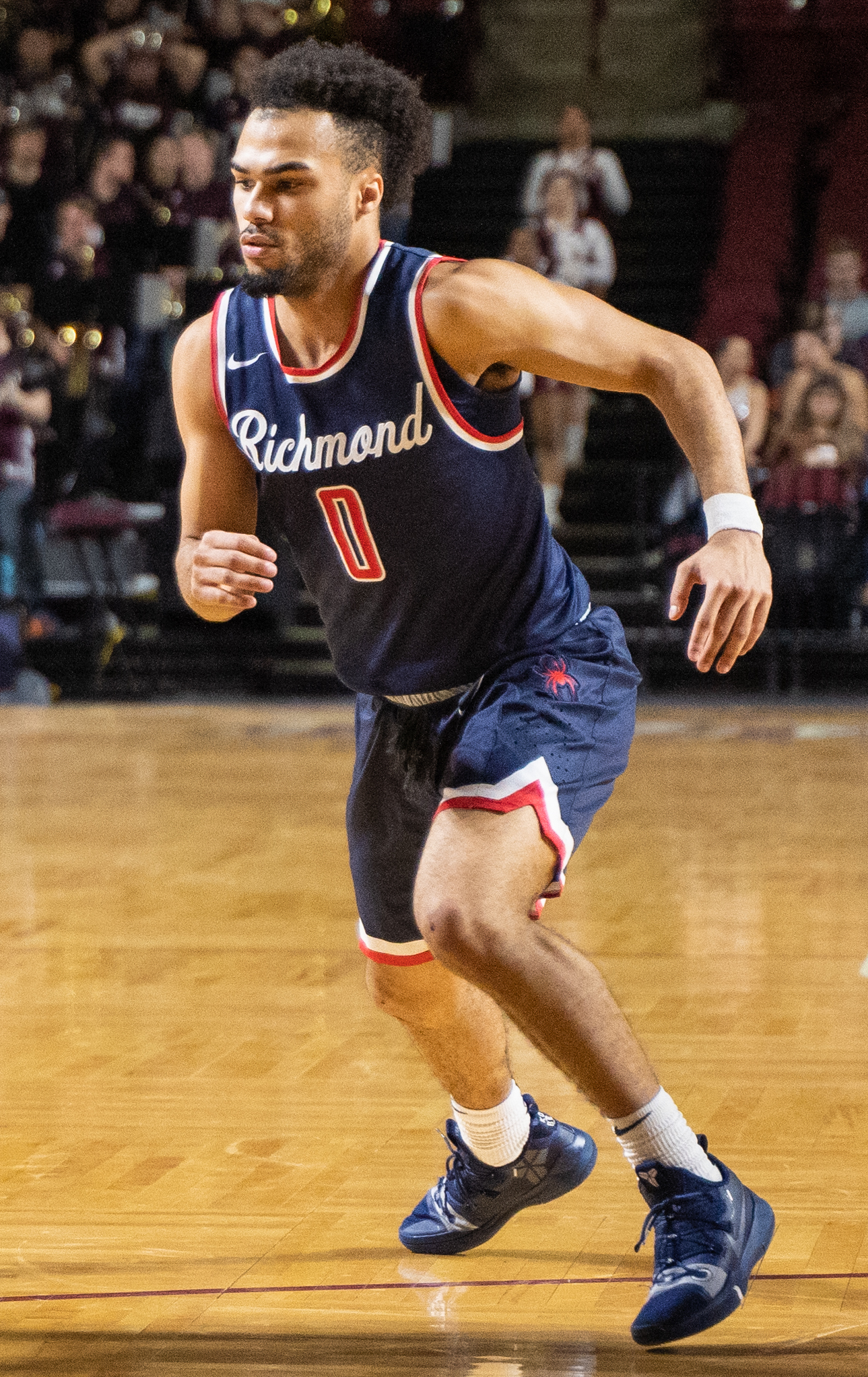
Jacob Gilyard, Richmond, 2022

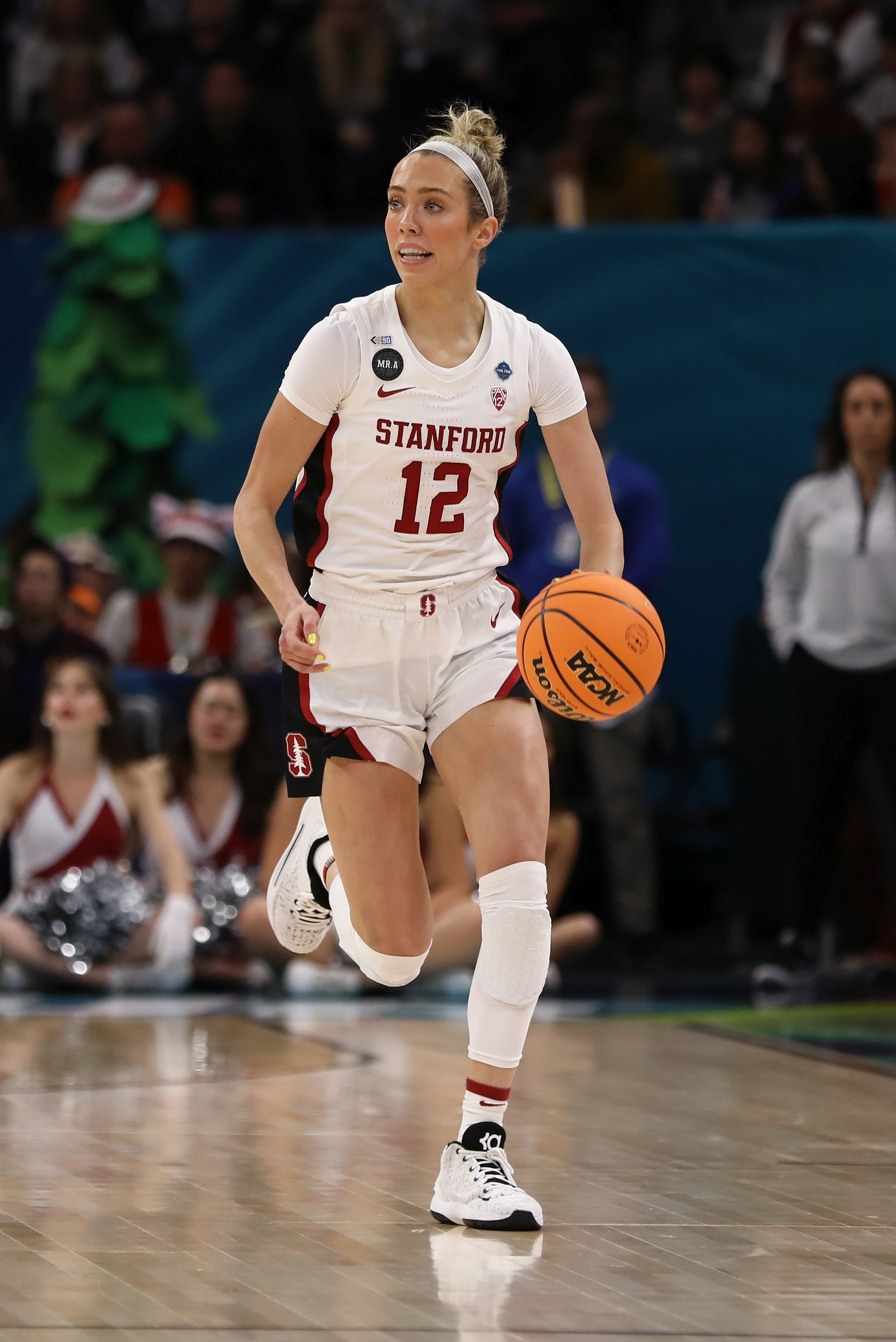
Lexie Hull, Stanford, 2022

Men
Year	Player	School	Position	Reference
2000–01	Shane Battier*	Duke	SF	
2001–02	Juan Dixon	Maryland	SG	
2002–03	David West*	Xavier	PF	
2003–04	Jameer Nelson*	Saint Joseph's	PG	
2004–05	Wayne Simien	Kansas	PF	
2005–06	JJ Redick*	Duke	SG	
2006–07	Alando Tucker	Wisconsin	SF	
2007–08	Shan Foster	Vanderbilt	SG / SF	
2008–09	Tyler Hansbrough	North Carolina	PF / C	
2009–10	Da'Sean Butler	West Virginia	SF / PF	
2010–11	Jimmer Fredette*	BYU	SG	
2011–12	Robbie Hummel	Purdue	SF	
2012–13	Jordan Hulls	Indiana	PG	
2013–14	Doug McDermott*	Creighton	SF / PF	
2014–15	Alex Barlow	Butler	PG	
2015–16	Denzel Valentine*	Michigan State	SF	
2016–17	Josh Hart	Villanova	SF	
2017–18	Jevon Carter	West Virginia	PG	
2018–19	Luke Maye	North Carolina	PF	
2019–20	Markus Howard	Marquette	PG	
2020–21	Luka Garza*	Iowa	C	
2021–22	Jacob Gilyard	Richmond	PG	

Women
Year	Player	School	Position	Reference
2000–01	No award			
2001–02	Sue Bird*	UConn	PG	
2002–03	LaToya Thomas	Mississippi State	F	
2003–04	Alana Beard*	Duke	SG / SF	
2004–05	Kendra Wecker	Kansas State	F	
2005–06	Seimone Augustus*	LSU	F	
2006–07	Alison Bales	Duke	C	
2007–08	Candice Wiggins*	Stanford	PG / SG	
2008–09	Courtney Paris	Oklahoma	C	
2009–10	Kelsey Griffin	Nebraska	F	
2010–11	Maya Moore*	UConn	PF	
2011–12	Nneka Ogwumike	Stanford	PF	
2012–13	Elena Delle Donne	Delaware	SF / SG	
2013–14	Stefanie Dolson	UConn	C	
2014–15	Samantha Logic	Iowa	PG	
2015–16	Breanna Stewart*	UConn	PF	
2016–17	Sydney Wiese	Oregon State	PG / SG	
2017–18	Gabby Williams	UConn	PF	
2018–19	Megan Gustafson*	Iowa	PF / C	
2019–20	Sabrina Ionescu*	Oregon	PG	
2020–21	Rennia Davis	Tennessee	F	
2021–22	Lexie Hull	Stanford	SG	
