= 2001 NCAA Division I men's basketball championship game =

American college basketball final

2001 NCAA tournament championship Game
National championship game
Arizona Wildcats	Duke Blue Devils
Pac-10	ACC
(28–7)	(34–4)
72	82
Head coach: Lute Olson	Head coach: Mike Krzyzewski
- AP: 8
- Coaches: 4
- AP: 3
- Coaches: 1
	1st half	2nd half	Total
Arizona Wildcats	33	39	72
Duke Blue Devils	35	47	82
- Date: April 2, 2001
- Venue: Hubert H. Humphrey Metrodome, Minneapolis, Minnesota
- MVP: Shane Battier, Duke
- Favorite: Duke by 3.5
- Referees: Scott Thornley, Frankie Bordeaux, Ed Corbett
- Attendance: 45,944

United States TV coverage
- Network: CBS
- Announcers: HD:Jim Nantz (play-by-play); Billy Packer (color); Bonnie Bernstein and Armen Keteyian (sideline); HD:Gus Johnson and Dan Bonner

The 2001 NCAA Division I men's basketball championship game was the finals of the 2001 NCAA Division I men's basketball tournament and it determined the national champion for the 2000-01 NCAA Division I men's basketball season The game was played on April 2, 2001, at the Hubert H. Humphrey Metrodome in Minneapolis, Minnesota and featured the East Regional Champion, #1-seeded Duke versus the Midwest Regional Champion, #2-seeded Arizona.

== Participants ==
=== Arizona Wildcats ===
Featuring future NBA stars Richard Jefferson and Gilbert Arenas along with Wake Forest transfer Loren Woods, future NBA player and coach Luke Walton and future Harlem Globetrotter Eugene "Wildkat" Edgerson, Arizona entered the season ranked #1 and entered the tournament as the #2 seed in the Midwest Regional.

The Wildcats would crush Eastern Illinois and Butler to reach the Sweet 16. Arizona would beat #3 Ole Miss 66–56 and #1 Illinois to reach the Final Four.

In an emotional season in which coach Lute Olson suffered the loss of his wife Bobbi, he would be just 40 minutes away from a second national championship after his Wildcats blew out defending national champion Michigan State. The game was close at halftime with Arizona leading by just 2. However, Arizona outscored Michigan State 48–31 in the second half en route to the 19-point victory.

=== Duke Blue Devils ===
Featuring Carlos Boozer, Jay Williams and national and Defensive Player of the Year Shane Battier, the Blue Devils would travel the same path they took nine years ago when they claimed their last championship in 1992 and became the first team since UCLA in 1972 and 1973 to repeat as national champions, from Greensboro to Philadelphia to Minneapolis. In their first four games of the tournament, Duke bested Monmouth, Missouri (coached by Duke player and assistant and future NBA coach Quin Snyder) and Los Angeles rivals UCLA and USC all by double digits.

In the Final Four, they met ACC rival Maryland for the fourth time that season after both road teams won during the ACC regular season before Duke won 84–82 in the ACC tournament semifinals in Atlanta en route to winning the tournament. Finding themselves down 39–17 with 6:57 to play in the first half and down 49–38 at the half, Duke went on to stage a comeback against the Terrapins and win 95–84 to advance to the championship game. Duke's 22-point deficit and 11-point halftime deficit marked the largest comeback in Final Four history.

== Starting lineups ==
Arizona	Position	Duke
Gilbert Arenas	G	Chris Duhon
Jason Gardner	G	† Jay Williams
Michael Wright	F	Mike Dunleavy Jr.
Richard Jefferson	F	† Shane Battier
Loren Woods	C	Casey Sanders
† 2001 Consensus First Team All-American

== Route to the game ==
Arizona Wildcats (#2 Midwest)		Round	Duke Blue Devils (#1 East)
Opponent	Result	Regionals	Opponent	Result
#15 Eastern Illinois Panthers	Win 101–76	First round	#16 Monmouth Hawks	Win 95–52
#10 Butler Bulldogs	Win 72–53	Second round	#8 Missouri Tigers	Win 94–81
#3 Ole Miss Rebels	Win 66–56	Regional semifinal	#4 UCLA Bruins	Win 76–63
#1 Illinois Fighting Illini	Win 87–81	Regional final	#6 USC Trojans	Win 79–69
Opponent	Result	Final Four	Opponent	Result
Michigan State Spartans (#1 South)	Win 80–61	National semifinal	Maryland Terrapins (#3 West)	Win 95–84

== Game Summary ==
The second-ranked team coming into the NCAA Tournament would leave giving both the school and coach Mike Krzyzewski their third national championship. Arizona cut Duke's lead to 39–37 early in the second half, but Mike Dunleavy Jr. – with his father, NBA coach Mike Dunleavy Sr., in the stands – connected on three consecutive three-pointers during an 11–2 Duke run on his way to a team-high 21 points. The Wildcats got back within 3 four times, including twice inside the four-minute TV timeout. However, Battier proved himself too much for the Wildcats to handle as he hit two critical shots to keep the Blue Devils comfortably ahead. Jay Williams, despite a poor shooting night, iced the game with a three-pointer from the top of the key off a Battier screen that gave Duke an 80–72 lead with under 2 minutes to play.

Following the season, Krzyzewski was also inducted into the Naismith Memorial Basketball Hall of Fame. Earlier in the season, the court at Cameron Indoor Stadium in Durham had been named Coach K Court after the Blue Devils' second game of the year, a victory over Villanova in the second round of the NIT Season Tip-Off (then the Preseason NIT) that was Krzyzewski's 500th victory as Duke head coach.

CBS

April 2nd, 2001

box score

#E1 Duke Blue Devils 82, #MW2 Arizona Wildcats 72
Scoring by half: 35–33, 47–39
Pts: Mike Dunleavy Jr. 21; Rebs: Carlos Boozer 12; Asts: Shane Battier/Chris Duhon 6	Pts: Loren Woods 22; Rebs: Loren Woods/Michael Wright 11; Asts: Gilbert Arenas/Luke Walton 4

Hubert H. Humphrey Metrodome, Minneapolis, Minnesota
Attendance: 45,944
Referees: Scott Thornley, Frankie Bordeaux, Ed Corbett
