= 2000–01 Ivy League men's basketball season =

The 2000–01 Ivy League men's basketball season was the Ivy League's 47th season of basketball. The Princeton Tigers competed in the 2001 NCAA Men's Division I Basketball Tournament because the team had the best record. A small forward from Columbia University, Craig Austin won the Ivy League Men's Basketball Player of the Year.

== Standings ==
| School | Coach | W | L |
|---|---|---|---|
| Princeton | John Thompson III | 11 | 3 |
| Brown | Glen Miller | 9 | 5 |
| Penn | Fran Dunphy | 9 | 5 |
| Harvard | Frank Sullivan | 7 | 7 |
| Columbia | Armond Hill | 7 | 7 |
| Yale | James Jones | 7 | 7 |
| Dartmouth | Dave Faucher | 3 | 11 |
| Cornell | Steve Donahue | 3 | 11 |
