= 2001 NCAA Division I men's basketball tournament =

Edition of USA college basketball tournament

- Season: 2000–01
- Teams: 65
- Finals site: Hubert H. Humphrey Metrodome, Minneapolis, Minnesota
- Champions: Duke Blue Devils (3rd title, 9th title game, 13th Final Four)
- Runner-up: Arizona Wildcats (2nd title game, 4th Final Four)
- Semifinalists: Maryland Terrapins (1st Final Four); Michigan State Spartans (5th Final Four)
- Winning coach: Mike Krzyzewski (3rd title)
- MOP: Shane Battier (Duke)
- Attendance: 612,089
- Top scorer: Jay Williams (Duke) (154 points)

The 2001 NCAA Division I men's basketball tournament involved 65 schools playing in single-elimination play to determine the national champion of men's NCAA Division I college basketball for the 2000–01 NCAA Division I men's basketball season. The 63rd annual edition of the tournament began on March 13, 2001, with the play-in game, and ended with the championship game on April 2, 2001, in Minneapolis, Minnesota, at the Hubert H. Humphrey Metrodome. This was the last Final Four to be held in the Hubert H. Humphrey Metrodome, as it was demolished in 2014. A total of 64 games were played.

This tournament is the first to feature 65 teams, due to the Mountain West Conference receiving an automatic bid for the first time. This meant that 31 conferences would have automatic bids to the tournament. The NCAA decided to maintain 34 at-large bids, which necessitated a play-in game between the #64 and #65 ranked teams, with the winner playing against a #1 seed in the first round. (Another option would have been to reduce the number of at-large bids to 33, which was the option chosen for the women's tournament.) This is also the first tournament to have been broadcast in high-definition, being broadcast on CBS.

This was the last tournament where the first- and second-round sites were tied to specific regionals. The "pod system" was instituted for the 2002 tournament to keep as many teams as possible closer to their campus in the first two rounds.

The Final Four consisted of Duke, making their second appearance in the Final Four in three years, Maryland, making their first appearance, Michigan State, the defending national champions, and Arizona, making their first appearance since winning the national championship in 1997.

Duke defeated Arizona 82–72 in the national championship game to win their third national title and first since 1992. Shane Battier of Duke was named the tournament's Most Outstanding Player.

== Schedule and venues ==
2001 first and second rounds (note: the play-in game was held in Dayton, Ohio)
2001 Regionals (blue) and Final Four (red)

The following are the sites that were selected to host each round of the 2001 tournament:

Opening Round

- March 13
  - University of Dayton Arena, Dayton, Ohio (Host: University of Dayton)

First and Second Rounds

- March 15 and 17
  - East Region
    - Greensboro Coliseum, Greensboro, North Carolina (Host: Atlantic Coast Conference)
    - Nassau Veterans Memorial Coliseum, Uniondale, New York (Hosts: Hofstra University, America East Conference)
  - West Region
    - BSU Pavilion, Boise, Idaho (Host: Boise State University)
    - Cox Arena, San Diego, California (Host: San Diego State University)
- March 16 and 18
  - Midwest Region
    - University of Dayton Arena, Dayton, Ohio (Host: University of Dayton)
    - Kemper Arena, Kansas City, Missouri (Host: Big 12 Conference)
  - South Region
    - Memphis Pyramid, Memphis, Tennessee (Host: University of Memphis)
    - Louisiana Superdome, New Orleans, Louisiana (Hosts: Sun Belt Conference, University of New Orleans)

Regional semifinals and finals (Sweet Sixteen and Elite Eight)

- March 22 and 24
  - East Regional, First Union Center, Philadelphia, Pennsylvania (Host: Atlantic 10 Conference)
  - West Regional, Arrowhead Pond of Anaheim, Anaheim, California (Host: Big West Conference)
- March 23 and 25
  - Midwest Regional, Alamodome, San Antonio, Texas (Host: University of Texas at San Antonio)
  - South Regional, Georgia Dome, Atlanta, Georgia (Host: Georgia Institute of Technology)

National semifinals and championship (Final Four and championship)

- March 31 and April 2
  - Hubert H. Humphrey Metrodome, Minneapolis, Minnesota (Host: University of Minnesota)

== Qualifying teams ==
=== Automatic bids ===
The following teams were automatic qualifiers for the 2001 NCAA field by virtue of winning their conference's tournament (except for the Ivy League and Pac-10, whose regular-season champions received their automatic bids).

Conference	School	Appearance	Last bid
ACC	Duke	25th	2000
America East	Hofstra	4th	2000
Atlantic 10	Temple	25th	2000
Big 12	Oklahoma	20th	2000
Big East	Boston College	12th	1997
Big Sky	Cal State Northridge	1st	Never
Big South	Winthrop	3rd	2000
Big Ten	Iowa	20th	1999
Big West	Utah State	14th	2000
Colonial	George Mason	3rd	1999
C-USA	Charlotte	8th	1999
Ivy League	Princeton	22nd	1998
MAAC	Iona	7th	2000
MAC	Kent State	2nd	1999
MCC	Butler	5th	2000
MEAC	Hampton	1st	Never
Mid-Con	Southern Utah	1st	Never
Missouri Valley	Indiana State	3rd	2000
Mountain West	BYU	19th	1995
Northeast	Monmouth	2nd	1996
Ohio Valley	Eastern Illinois	2nd	1992
Pac-10	Stanford	10th	2000
Patriot	Holy Cross	9th	1993
SEC	Kentucky	43rd	2000
Southern	UNC Greensboro	2nd	1996
Southland	Northwestern State	1st	Never
Sun Belt	Western Kentucky	17th	1995
SWAC	Alabama State	1st	Never
TAAC	Georgia State	2nd	1991
WAC	Hawaii	3rd	1994
West Coast	Gonzaga	4th	2000

=== Listed by region and seeding ===
East Regional – Philadelphia
Seed	School	Conference	Record	Berth Type
#1	Duke	ACC	29–4	Automatic
#2	Kentucky	SEC	22–9	Automatic
#3	Boston College	Big East	26–4	Automatic
#4	UCLA	Pac-10	21–8	At-large
#5	Ohio State	Big Ten	20–10	At-large
#6	USC	Pac-10	21–9	At-large
#7	Iowa	Big Ten	22–11	Automatic
#8	Georgia	SEC	16–14	At-large
#9	Missouri	Big 12	19–12	At-large
#10	Creighton	Missouri Valley	24–7	At-large
#11	Oklahoma State	Big 12	20–9	At-large
#12	Utah State	Big West	27–5	Automatic
#13	Hofstra	America East	26–4	Automatic
#14	Southern Utah	Mid-Continent	25–5	Automatic
#15	Holy Cross	Patriot	22–7	Automatic
#16	Monmouth	NEC	21–9	Automatic

South Regional – Atlanta
Seed	School	Conference	Record	Berth Type
#1	Michigan State	Big Ten	24–4	At-large
#2	North Carolina	ACC	25–6	At-large
#3	Florida	SEC	23–6	At-large
#4	Oklahoma	Big 12	26–6	Automatic
#5	Virginia	ACC	20–8	At-large
#6	Texas	Big 12	25–8	At-large
#7	Penn State	Big Ten	19–11	At-large
#8	California	Pac-10	20–10	At-large
#9	Fresno State	WAC	25–6	At-large
#10	Providence	Big East	21–9	At-large
#11	Temple	Atlantic 10	21–12	Automatic
#12	Gonzaga	WCC	24–6	Automatic
#13	Indiana State	Missouri Valley	21–11	Automatic
#14	Western Kentucky	Sun Belt	24–6	Automatic
#15	Princeton	Ivy League	16–10	Automatic
#16	Alabama State	SWAC	22–8	Automatic

West Regional – Anaheim
Seed	School	Conference	Record	Berth Type
#1	Stanford	Pac-10	28–2	Automatic
#2	Iowa State	Big 12	25–5	At-large
#3	Maryland	ACC	21–10	At-large
#4	Indiana	Big Ten	21–12	At-large
#5	Cincinnati	C-USA	23–9	At-large
#6	Wisconsin	Big Ten	18–10	At-large
#7	Arkansas	SEC	20–10	At-large
#8	Georgia Tech	ACC	17–12	At-large
#9	Saint Joseph's	Atlantic 10	25–6	At-large
#10	Georgetown	Big East	23–7	At-large
#11	Georgia State	TAAC	28–4	Automatic
#12	BYU	Mountain West	24–8	Automatic
#13	Kent State	MAC	23–9	Automatic
#14	George Mason	Colonial	18–11	Automatic
#15	Hampton	MEAC	24–6	Automatic
#16	UNC Greensboro	Southern	19–11	Automatic

Midwest Regional – San Antonio
Seed	School	Conference	Record	Berth Type
#1	Illinois	Big Ten	24–7	At-large
#2	Arizona	Pac-10	23–7	At-large
#3	Ole Miss	SEC	25–7	At-large
#4	Kansas	Big 12	24–6	At-large
#5	Syracuse	Big East	24–8	At-large
#6	Notre Dame	Big East	19–9	At-large
#7	Wake Forest	ACC	19–10	At-large
#8	Tennessee	SEC	19–11	At-Large
#9	Charlotte	C-USA	21–10	Automatic
#10	Butler	MCC	23–7	Automatic
#11	Xavier	Atlantic 10	21–7	At-large
#12	Hawaii	WAC	17–13	Automatic
#13	Cal State Northridge	Big Sky	22–9	Automatic
#14	Iona	MAAC	22–10	Automatic
#15	Eastern Illinois	Ohio Valley	21–9	Automatic
#16	Northwestern State	Southland	18–12	Automatic
#16	Winthrop	Big South	18–12	Automatic

=== Bids by conference ===
Bids	Conference	Schools
7	Big Ten	Illinois, Indiana, Iowa, Michigan State, Ohio State, Penn State, Wisconsin
6	ACC	Duke, Georgia Tech, Maryland, North Carolina, Virginia, Wake Forest
6	Big 12	Iowa State, Kansas, Missouri, Oklahoma, Oklahoma State, Texas
6	SEC	Arkansas, Florida, Georgia, Kentucky, Ole Miss, Tennessee
5	Big East	Boston College, Georgetown, Notre Dame, Providence, Syracuse
5	Pac-10	Arizona, California, Stanford, UCLA, USC
3	Atlantic 10	Saint Joseph's, Temple, Xavier
2	C-USA	Charlotte, Cincinnati
2	Missouri Valley	Creighton, Indiana State
2	WAC	Fresno State, Hawaii
1	21 other conferences	

== Bids by conference ==
Bids by Conference
Bids	Conference(s)
7	Big Ten
6	ACC, Big 12, SEC
5	Big East, Pac-10
3	Atlantic 10
2	C-USA, Missouri Valley, WAC
1	21 others

== Final Four ==
At Hubert H. Humphrey Metrodome, Minneapolis, Minnesota

=== National semifinals ===
- March 31, 2001
  - Duke (E1) 95, Maryland (W3) 84
  The fourth meeting of the year between ACC rivals Duke and Maryland – both road teams won during the ACC regular season before Duke won 84–82 in the ACC Tournament semifinals in Atlanta en route to winning the tournament – turned into a classic. Maryland jumped out of the gate to an early 39–17 lead. It appeared the Terps would eliminate Duke, led by senior Shane Battier. However, Duke was able to cut the lead at halftime to 49–38. Duke would take its first lead when Jason Williams drained a three to give Duke the lead 73–72 with 6:48 to play. Duke closed the game with a 23–12 run to stun Gary Williams' Maryland squad. Referees: David Libbey, Mark Reischling, and Ted Hillary.
  - Arizona (M2) 80, Michigan State (S1) 61
  In an emotional season in which Arizona coach Lute Olson suffered the loss of his wife Bobbi, he would be just 40 minutes away from a second National Championship after his Wildcats destroyed the defending national champion Michigan State Spartans. The game was close at halftime with Arizona leading by just 2. However, Arizona outscored Michigan State 48–31 in the second half en route to the 19-point victory.

=== Championship game ===
- April 2, 2001
  - Duke (E1) 82, Arizona (M2) 72
  The second-ranked team coming into the NCAA tournament would leave giving coach Mike Krzyzewski his third National Championship at Duke. Arizona cut Duke's lead to 39–37 early in the second half, but Mike Dunleavy Jr. connected on three three-pointers during an 11–2 Duke run. Dunleavy Jr. led the Duke Blue Devils with 21 points. The Arizona Wildcats would cut the gap to 3 four times, twice inside the four-minute TV timeout. However, Shane Battier proved himself too much for the Wildcats to handle as he hit two critical shots to put the Blue Devils comfortably ahead. Jason Williams, despite a poor shooting night, iced the game with a three-pointer from the top of the key with under 2 minutes to play to give Duke an eight-point lead. The final score was Duke 82 – Arizona 72.

== Bracket ==
=== Opening Round game – Dayton, Ohio ===
Winner advances to 16th seed in Midwest Regional vs. (1) Illinois.

Opening Round game March 13
16	Winthrop	67
16	Northwestern State	71

=== East regional — Philadelphia, Pennsylvania ===
First round March 15
1	Duke	95
16	Monmouth	52
Greensboro
8	Georgia	68
9	Missouri	70
5	~~Ohio State~~	68
12	Utah State	77^{OT}
Greensboro
4	UCLA	61
13	Hofstra	48
6	USC	69
11	Oklahoma State	54
Uniondale
3	Boston College	68
14	Southern Utah	65
7	Iowa	69
10	Creighton	56
Uniondale
2	Kentucky	72
15	Holy Cross	68

Second round March 17
1	Duke	94
9	Missouri	81
12	Utah State	50
4	UCLA	75
6	USC	74
3	Boston College	71
7	Iowa	79
2	Kentucky	92

Regional semifinals March 22
1	Duke	76
4	UCLA	63
6	USC	80
2	Kentucky	76

Regional finals March 24
1	Duke	79
6	USC	69

Ohio State vacated all wins and its NCAA Tournament appearance from the 2000–01 season due to the Jim O’Brien scandal. Unlike forfeiture, a vacated game does not result in the other school being credited with a win, only with Ohio State removing the wins from its own record.

=== West regional — Anaheim, California ===
First round March 15
1	Stanford	88
16	UNC-Greensboro	60
San Diego
8	Georgia Tech	62
9	Saint Joseph's	66
5	Cincinnati	84
12	BYU	59
San Diego
4	Indiana	73
13	Kent State	77
6	Wisconsin	49
11	Georgia State	50
Boise
3	Maryland	83
14	George Mason	80
7	Arkansas	61
10	Georgetown	63
Boise
2	Iowa State	57
15	Hampton	58

Second round March 17
1	Stanford	90
9	Saint Joseph's	83
5	Cincinnati	66
13	Kent State	43
11	Georgia State	60
3	Maryland	79
10	Georgetown	76
15	Hampton	57

Regional semifinals March 22
1	Stanford	78
5	Cincinnati	65
3	Maryland	76
10	Georgetown	66

Regional finals March 24
1	Stanford	73
3	Maryland	87

=== South regional — Atlanta, Georgia ===
First round March 16
1	Michigan State	69
16	Alabama State	35
Memphis
8	California	70
9	Fresno State	82
5	Virginia	85
12	Gonzaga	86
Memphis
4	Oklahoma	68
13	Indiana State	70^{OT}
6	Texas	65
11	Temple	79
New Orleans
3	Florida	69
14	Western Kentucky	56
7	Penn State	69
10	Providence	59
New Orleans
2	North Carolina	70
15	Princeton	48

Second round March 18
1	Michigan State	81
9	Fresno State	65
12	Gonzaga	85
13	Indiana State	68
11	Temple	75
3	Florida	54
7	Penn State	82
2	North Carolina	74

Regional semifinals March 23
1	Michigan State	77
12	Gonzaga	62
11	Temple	84
7	Penn State	72

Regional finals March 25
1	Michigan State	69
11	Temple	62

=== Midwest regional — San Antonio, Texas ===
First round March 16
1	Illinois	96
16	Northwestern State	54
Dayton
8	Tennessee	63
9	Charlotte	70
5	Syracuse	79
12	Hawaii	69
Dayton
4	Kansas	99
13	Cal State Northridge	75
6	Notre Dame	83
11	Xavier	71
Kansas City
3	Ole Miss	72
14	Iona	70
7	Wake Forest	63
10	Butler	79
Kansas City
2	Arizona	101
15	Eastern Illinois	76

Second round March 18
1	Illinois	79
9	Charlotte	61
5	Syracuse	58
4	Kansas	87
6	Notre Dame	56
3	Ole Miss	59
10	Butler	52
2	Arizona	73

Regional semifinals March 23
1	Illinois	80
4	Kansas	64
3	Ole Miss	56
2	Arizona	66

Regional finals March 25
1	Illinois	81
2	Arizona	87

=== Final Four — Minneapolis, Minnesota ===
National semifinals March 31
E1	Duke	95
W3	Maryland	84
S1	Michigan State	61
M2	Arizona	80

National finals April 2
E1	Duke	82
M2	Arizona	72

== Upsets ==
This tournament featured many upsets in the first two rounds, with pairs of #10, #11, #12, and #13 seeds winning in the first and a #10, #11, and #12 seeds all making it to the Sweet 16. The best remembered and most unexpected occurred when Hampton beat number 2 seed Iowa State 58–57 in the first round. The Pirates were down by as much as 11 in the game and outscored the Cyclones 10–0 in the final seven minutes of the game. Tarvis Williams made the winning shot with 6.9 seconds left. The video of Hampton coach Steve Merfield being lifted in the air by player David Johnson during the celebration has become a classic clip, often played by CBS and ESPN to showcase the excitement of the underdog in the NCAA tournament.

Hampton became only the fourth #15 seed to win a game since the tournament expanded to 64 teams in 1985 and the first since 1997. They went on to lose to Georgetown in the second round, failing to become the first seed that low to make the Round of 16. The Pirates were the last #15 seed to advance in the tournament until 2012, in which two #15 seeds beat their #2-seeded opponents.

Temple became just the 3rd #11 seed to make it to the Elite Eight since the tournament had expanded, upsetting #6 Texas and #3 Florida on the way. In the same region, 12-seed Gonzaga made the Sweet 16 for the third year in a row, all as a double digit seed. Both teams would lose to defending champion #1 Michigan State who, along with #7 Penn State, were the only top seeds to make it past the second round in that region (Penn State would lose to Temple in the Sweet 16).

== Announcers ==
- Jim Nantz/Billy Packer/Bonnie Bernstein – First and Second Rounds at New Orleans, Louisiana; East Regional at Philadelphia, Pennsylvania; Final Four and National Championship at Minneapolis, Minnesota
- Dick Enberg/Bill Walton/Lesley Visser – First and Second Rounds at San Diego, California; Midwest Regional at San Antonio, Texas
- Verne Lundquist/Bill Raftery/Armen Keteyian – First and Second Rounds at Kansas City, Missouri; South Regional at Atlanta, Georgia
- Gus Johnson/Dan Bonner/Dwayne Ballen – First and Second Rounds at Uniondale, New York; West Regional at Anaheim, California
- Kevin Harlan/Jon Sundvold/Charles Davis – First and Second Rounds at Greensboro, North Carolina
- Ian Eagle/Jim Spanarkel/Brett Haber – First and Second Rounds at Memphis, Tennessee
- Tim Brando/Rick Pitino/Spencer Tillman – Opening Round Game, First and Second Rounds at Dayton, Ohio
- Craig Bolerjack/James Worthy/Bob Wenzel – First and Second Rounds at Boise, Idaho

Greg Gumbel once again served as the studio host, joined by analyst Clark Kellogg.

== See also ==
- 2001 NCAA Division II men's basketball tournament
- 2001 NCAA Division III men's basketball tournament
- 2001 NCAA Division I women's basketball tournament
- 2001 NCAA Division II women's basketball tournament
- 2001 NCAA Division III women's basketball tournament
- 2001 National Invitation Tournament
- 2001 Women's National Invitation Tournament
- 2001 NAIA Division I men's basketball tournament
- 2001 NAIA Division II men's basketball tournament
