= 2000–01 North Carolina Tar Heels men's basketball team =

American college basketball season

2000–01 North Carolina Tar Heels men's basketball

ACC regular season co-champions NABC Classic champions Tournament of Champions champions

NCAA tournament, Round of 32
- Conference: Atlantic Coast Conference

Ranking
- Coaches: No. 10
- AP: No. 6
- Record: 26–7 (13–3 ACC Atlantic Coast Conference)
- Head coach: Matt Doherty (1st season)
- Assistant coaches: Doug Wojcik (1st season); Fred Quartlebaum (1st season); Bob MacKinnon (1st season)
- Captain: Brendan Haywood
- Home arena: Dean Smith Center

2000–01 ACC men's basketball standings
	Conf.				Overall
Team	W		L	PCT	W		L	PCT
No. 6 North Carolina	13	–	3	.813	26	–	7	.788
No. 1 Duke †	13	–	3	.813	35	–	4	.897
No. 11 Maryland	10	–	6	.625	25	–	11	.694
No. 16 Virginia	9	–	7	.563	20	–	9	.690
Georgia Tech	8	–	8	.500	17	–	13	.567
No. 23 Wake Forest	8	–	8	.500	19	–	11	.633
NC State	5	–	11	.313	13	–	16	.448
Florida State	4	–	12	.250	9	–	21	.300
Clemson	2	–	14	.125	12	–	19	.387
† 2001 ACC tournament winner Rankings from AP Poll

The 2000–01 North Carolina Tar Heels men's basketball team represented the University of North Carolina at Chapel Hill during the 2000–01 NCAA Division I men's basketball season. Their head coach was Matt Doherty. The team captain for this season was Brendan Haywood. The team played its home games in the Dean Smith Center in Chapel Hill, North Carolina as a member of the Atlantic Coast Conference.

== Roster ==
2000–01 North Carolina Tar Heels men's basketball team
Players
Coaches

Pos.	#	Name	Height	Weight	Year	Previous school	Hometown
C	00	Brendan Haywood (C)	7 ft 0 in (2.13 m)	268 lb (122 kg)	Sr	Dudley	Greensboro, North Carolina
G	3	Brian Morrison	6 ft 2 in (1.88 m)	178 lb (81 kg)	Fr	Lake Washington	Redmond, Washington
G/F	11	Michael Brooker	6 ft 6 in (1.98 m)	222 lb (101 kg)	Sr	Brentwood Academy	Sandersville, Georgia
C	13	Neil Fingleton (injured)	7 ft 5 in (2.26 m)	280 lb (127 kg)	Fr	Holy Name	Durham, England
G	14	Jonathan Holmes	6 ft 0 in (1.83 m)	185 lb (84 kg)	So	Bloomington South	Bloomington, Indiana
G	22	Ronald Curry	6 ft 2 in (1.88 m)	200 lb (91 kg)	So	Hampton	Hampton, Virginia
G/F	24	Max Owens	6 ft 5 in (1.96 m)	198 lb (90 kg)	Sr	Mt. Zion Academy	Macon, Georgia
G/F	25	Jason Capel	6 ft 8 in (2.03 m)	230 lb (104 kg)	Jr	St. John's Prospect Hall	Fayetteville, North Carolina
G	31	Adam Boone	6 ft 2 in (1.88 m)	192 lb (87 kg)	Fr	Minnetonka	Minneapolis, Minnesota
F	32	Orlando Meléndez	6 ft 8 in (2.03 m)	200 lb (91 kg)	Jr	McDowell	Juana Díaz, Puerto Rico
F	35	Jim Everett (W)	6 ft 8 in (2.03 m)	240 lb (109 kg)	Sr	Providence	Charlotte, North Carolina
G	40	Joseph Forte	6 ft 4 in (1.93 m)	192 lb (87 kg)	So	DeMatha	Greenbelt, Maryland
F/C	42	Kris Lang	6 ft 11 in (2.11 m)	256 lb (116 kg)	Jr	Hunter Huss	Gastonia, North Carolina
F	44	Will Johnson (W)	6 ft 8 in (2.03 m)	216 lb (98 kg)	So	Hickory	Hickory, North Carolina
F	45	Julius Peppers	6 ft 6 in (1.98 m)	290 lb (132 kg)	So	Southern Nash	Bailey, North Carolina
F/C	50	Brian Bersticker	6 ft 10 in (2.08 m)	241 lb (109 kg)	Jr	Kempsville	Virginia Beach, Virginia

Head coach

Matt Doherty

Assistant coach(es)

Doug Wojcik, Fred Quartlebaum, Bob MacKinnon

Legend

- (C) Team captain
- (S) Suspended
- (I) Ineligible
- (W) Walk-on
- Injured
- Current redshirt

Roster

Fingleton had back surgery in August 2000, but was unable to practice with the team until midway into the season.

== Schedule and results ==
This season was Doherty's first year as head coach, after the retirement of Bill Guthridge. He was formally announced as head coach on July 11, 2000.

The Tar Heels started the season ranked sixth in the AP Poll. After suffering back to back losses from Michigan State and an upset loss against an unranked Kentucky, the Tar Heels went on an 18-0 undefeated run, including an undefeated 11-0 run in conference play. During this run, the Tar Heels were ranked number one in the AP Poll; this Tar Heel team was the first team Doherty coached that reached that achievement. Despite losses to Clemson, Virginia, and eventual national champions Duke in return fixtures, the Tar Heels won a share of the Atlantic Coast Conference regular season title.

The Tar Heels were the number one seed in the 2001 ACC men's basketball tournament, held that year in Atlanta, Georgia. They defeated Clemson and Georgia Tech in the semifinals and finals, respectfully, before falling to Duke in the final.

Seeded second in the South Region for the NCAA Tournament, the Tar Heels defeated fifteenth-seeded Princeton in New Orleans, Louisiana before falling to seventh-seeded Penn State in a surprise upset.

The Tar Heels would end the season ranked sixth in the AP Poll and fifth in the Coaches Poll.

On March 30, 2001, Doherty was named the AP Coach of the Year. He was the first coach to win this honor in his first season coaching a team since Kelvin Sampson in 1995.

Date time, TV	Rank^{#}	Opponent^{#}	Result	Record	High points	High rebounds	High assists	Site (attendance) city, state
October 21, 2000*; 2:00 pm		Blue Team/White Team; Scrimmage						Dean Smith Center (10,225); Chapel Hill, NC
November 6, 2000*; 7:00 pm		Yakima Sun Kings; Exhibition game	W 96–87	0–0	22 – Tied	13 – Haywood	9 – Forte	Dean Smith Center; Chapel Hill, NC
November 10, 2000*; 7:30 pm	No. 6	Winthrop; NABC Classic	W 66–61	1–0	14 – Tied	8 – Lang	4 – Forte	Dean Smith Center (16,850); Chapel Hill, NC
November 11, 2000*; 8:30 pm	No. 6	Tulsa; NABC Classic	W 91–81	2–0	38 – Forte	10 – Forte	6 – Forte	Dean Smith Center (19,875); Chapel Hill, NC
November 17, 2000*; 7:30 pm, Fox Sports South	No. 7	at Appalachian State	W 99–69	3–0	20 – Forte	6 – Tied	6 – Capel	Holmes Center (8,325); Boone, NC
November 21, 2000*; 7:00 pm	No. 7	EA California All-Stars; Exhibition game	W 88–65	0–0	19 – Forte	17 – Haywood	–	Carmichael Auditorium; Chapel Hill, NC
November 29, 2000*; 7:30 pm, ESPN2	No. 6	at No. 3 Michigan State; ACC–Big Ten Challenge	L 64–77	3–1	22 – Lang	5 – Tied	5 – Capel	Breslin Center (14,759); East Lansing, MI
December 2, 2000*; 3:50 pm, CBS	No. 6	Kentucky; Rivalry	L 76–93	3–2	19 – Forte	11 – Haywood	5 – Morrison	Dean Smith Center (21,750); Chapel Hill, NC
December 4, 2000*; 7:00 pm, ESPN2	No. 14	Miami (FL)	W 67–45	4–2	18 – Haywood	14 – Haywood	7 – Forte	Dean Smith Center (19,859); Chapel Hill, NC
December 9, 2000*; 9:00 pm, Fox Sports	No. 14	at Texas A&M	W 82–60	5–2	23 – Forte	7 – Capel	7 – Capel	Reed Arena (9,123); College Station, TX
December 17, 2000*; 1:30 pm, RJ	No. 15	Buffalo	W 95–74	6–2	23 – Forte	11 – Capel	10 – Capel	Dean Smith Center (18,134); Chapel Hill, NC
December 23, 2000*; 4:00 pm, CBS	No. 15	at UCLA	W 80–70	7–2	29 – Forte	13 – Haywood	3 – Tied	Pauley Pavilion (10,593); Los Angeles, CA
December 29, 2000*; 9:15 pm, RJ	No. 14	vs. UMass; Tournament of Champions	W 91–60	8–2	16 – Forte	7 – Tied	4 – Curry	Charlotte Coliseum (13,224); Charlotte, NC
December 30, 2000*; 9:15 pm, RJ	No. 14	vs. Charleston; Tournament of Champions	W 64–60	9–2	29 – Forte	8 – Tied	3 – Capel	Charlotte Coliseum (13,378); Charlotte, NC
January 2, 2001; 8:00 pm, RJ	No. 13	at Georgia Tech	W 84–70	10–2 (1–0)	20 – Forte	12 – Lang	4 – Curry	Alexander Coliseum (9,510); Atlanta, GA
January 6, 2001; 9:00 pm, ESPN	No. 13	No. 4 Wake Forest	W 70–69	11–2 (2–0)	24 – Haywood	10 – Haywood	7 – Curry	Dean Smith Center (21,750); Chapel Hill, NC
January 10, 2001; 7:00 pm, ESPN	No. 9	at No. 14 Maryland	W 86–83	12–2 (3–0)	26 – Forte	10 – Capel	7 – Curry	Cole Field House (14,500); College Park, MD
January 13, 2001*; 1:00 pm, ABC	No. 9	Marquette	W 84–54	13–2	17 – Haywood	9 – Tied	3 – Haywood	Dean Smith Center (21,750); Chapel Hill, NC
January 17, 2001; 7:00 pm, ESPN	No. 6	Clemson	W 92–65	14–2 (4–0)	14 – Forte	9 – Capel	5 – Capel	Dean Smith Center (21,335); Chapel Hill, NC
January 20, 2001; 4:00 pm, RJ	No. 6	at Florida State	W 80–70	15–2 (5–0)	28 – Forte	6 – Capel	4 – Curry	Tallahassee Civic Center (7,452); Tallahassee, FL
January 24, 2001; 7:00 pm, ESPN	No. 5	No. 13 Virginia	W 88–81	16–2 (6–0)	33 – Forte	10 – Haywood	4 – Tied	Dean Smith Center (21,750); Chapel Hill, NC
January 28, 2001; 1:30 pm, ESPN2	No. 5	at NC State; Carolina–State Game	W 60–52	17–2 (7–0)	21 – Forte	8 – Tied	5 – Tied	Raleigh ESA (19,722); Raleigh, NC
February 1, 2001; 9:00 pm, ESPN2	No. 4	at No. 2 Duke; Carolina–Duke rivalry	W 85–83	18–2 (8–0)	24 – Forte	16 – Forte	6 – Forte	Cameron Indoor Stadium (9,314); Durham, NC
February 3, 2001; 4:00 pm, RJ	No. 4	Georgia Tech	W 82–69	19–2 (9–0)	23 – Forte	11 – Capel	5 – Capel	Dean Smith Center (21,750); Chapel Hill, NC
February 6, 2001; 9:00 pm, RJ	No. 1	at No. 19 Wake Forest	W 80–74	20–2 (10–0)	24 – Forte	10 – Capel	6 – Haywood	LJVM Coliseum (14,407); Winston-Salem, NC
February 10, 2001; 1:00 pm, CBS	No. 1	No. 13 Maryland	W 96–82	21–2 (11–0)	27 – Capel	8 – Capel	8 – Curry	Dean Smith Center (21,750); Chapel Hill, NC
February 18, 2001; 4:00 pm, RJ	No. 1	at Clemson	L 65–75	21–3 (11–1)	16 – Tied	12 – Capel	4 – Tied	Littlejohn Coliseum (11,200); Clemson, SC
February 22, 2001; 8:00 pm, RJ	No. 2	Florida State	W 95–67	22–3 (12–1)	36 – Forte	9 – Lang	4 – Forte	Dean Smith Center (21,652); Chapel Hill, NC
February 24, 2001; 1:30 pm, ESPN2	No. 2	at No. 9 Virginia	L 66–86	22–4 (12–2)	28 – Forte	9 – Capel	5 – Tied	University Hall (8,392); Charlottesville, VA
February 28, 2001; 9:00 pm, ESPN	No. 4	NC State; Carolina–State Game	W 76–63	23–4 (13–2)	27 – Forte	8 – Haywood	4 – Capel	Dean Smith Center (21,750); Chapel Hill, NC
March 4, 2001; 3:30 pm, ESPN	No. 4	No. 2 Duke; Carolina–Duke rivalry	L 81–95	23–5 (13–3)	21 – Forte	11 – Capel	5 – Curry	Dean Smith Center (21,750); Chapel Hill, NC
ACC Tournament
March 9, 2001; 12:00 pm, ESPN	(1) No. 6	vs. (9) Clemson; Quarterfinal	W 99–81	24–5	23 – Capel	3 – Capel	10 – Curry	Georgia Dome; Atlanta, GA
March 10, 2001; 1:30 pm, ESPN	(1) No. 6	vs. (5) Georgia Tech; Semifinal	W 70–63	25–5	27 – Forte	12 – Forte	4 – Capel	Georgia Dome; Atlanta, GA
March 11, 2001; 1:00PM, ESPN	(1) No. 6	vs. (2) No. 3 Duke; Rivalry/Final	L 53–79	25–6	14 – Forte	13 – Haywood	4 – Tied	Georgia Dome (40,083); Atlanta, GA
NCAA Tournament
March 16, 2001; CBS	(2 S) No. 6	vs. (15 S) Princeton; First Round	W 70–48	26–6	15 – Haywood	12 – Forte	8 – Capel	Louisiana Superdome (12,107); New Orleans, LA
March 18, 2001; CBS	(2 S) No. 6	vs. (7 S) Penn State; Second Round	L 74–82	26–7	21 – Peppers	13 – Haywood	7 – Curry	Louisiana Superdome; New Orleans, LA
*Non-conference game. ^{#}Rankings from AP Poll. (#) Tournament seedings in parentheses. S=South.

== Rankings ==
Ranking movements Legend: ██ Increase in ranking ██ Decrease in ranking
	Week																			
Poll	Pre	1	2	3	4	5	6	7	8	9	10	11	12	13	14	15	16	17	18	Final
AP	6	7	7	6	14	15	15	14	13	9	6	5	4	1	1	2	4	6	6	Not released
Coaches	4	4^	7	6	12	15	16	16	14	11	6	6	4	1	1	2	4	5	5	10

*AP does not release post-NCAA Tournament rankings
^Coaches did not release a week 2 poll

== Team players drafted into the NBA ==
Year	Round	Pick	Player	NBA club
2001	1	20	Brendan Haywood	Cleveland Cavaliers
2001	1	21	Joseph Forte	Boston Celtics
