= 2000–01 Gonzaga Bulldogs men's basketball team =

American college basketball season

2000–01 Gonzaga Bulldogs men's basketball

WCC tournament champions WCC Regular Season Champion

NCAA tournament, Sweet Sixteen
- Conference: West Coast Conference

Ranking
- Coaches: No. 20
- Record: 26–7 (13–1 WCC)
- Head coach: Mark Few (2nd season)
- Assistant coaches: Bill Grier (10th season); Leon Rice (2nd season)
- Home arena: Charlotte Y. Martin Centre

2000–01 West Coast Conference men's basketball standings
	Conf.				Overall
Team	W		L	PCT	W		L	PCT
Gonzaga †	13	–	1	.929	26	–	7	.788
Pepperdine	12	–	2	.857	22	–	9	.710
Santa Clara	10	–	4	.714	20	–	12	.625
San Diego	7	–	7	.500	16	–	13	.552
San Francisco	5	–	9	.357	12	–	18	.400
Loyola Marymount	5	–	9	.357	9	–	19	.321
Portland	4	–	10	.286	11	–	17	.393
Saint Mary's	0	–	14	.000	2	–	27	.069
† 2001 WCC tournament winner Rankings from AP Poll

The 2000–01 Gonzaga Bulldogs men's basketball team (also informally referred to as the Zags) represented Gonzaga University in the 2000–01 NCAA Division I men's basketball season. The team was led by head coach Mark Few, in his 2nd season as head coach, and played their home games at the Charlotte Y. Martin Centre in Spokane, Washington. This was the Bulldogs' 21st season as a member of the West Coast Conference. Gonzaga reached the Sweet Sixteen of the NCAA tournament for the 3rd consecutive season.

== Roster ==
2000–01 Gonzaga Bulldogs men's basketball team
Players
Coaches

Pos.	#	Name	Height	Weight	Year	Previous school	Hometown
F	31	Casey Calvary	6 ft 8 in (2.03 m)	215 lb (98 kg)	Jr	Bellarmine Prep	Tacoma, WA
G	21	Dan Dickau	6 ft 0 in (1.83 m)	180 lb (82 kg)	Jr	Prairie; Washington	Vancouver, WA
F	32	Zach Gourde	6 ft 8 in (2.03 m)	245 lb (111 kg)	RS So	Prairie	Vancouver, WA
G	1	Winston Brooks	6 ft 0 in (1.83 m)	198 lb (90 kg)	So	Huguenot; Howard College; North Idaho College	Richmond, VA
G	20	Kyle Bankhead	6 ft 0 in (1.83 m)	195 lb (88 kg)	RS Fr	Walla Walla	Walla Walla, WA
G	10	Blake Stepp	6 ft 4 in (1.93 m)	194 lb (88 kg)	Fr	South Eugene	Eugene, OR
F	33	Cory Violette	6 ft 8 in (2.03 m)	265 lb (120 kg)	Fr	Bishop Kelly	Boise, ID

Head coach

- Mark Few

Assistant coach(es)

- Bill Grier
- Leon Rice

Legend

- (C) Team captain
- (S) Suspended
- (I) Ineligible
- (W) Walk-on
- Injured
- Current redshirt

== Schedule and results ==
Date time, TV	Rank^{#}	Opponent^{#}	Result	Record	Site (attendance) city, state
Regular season
Nov 29, 2000*		at No. 5 Arizona	L 87–101	3–1	McKale Center; Tucson, Arizona
Dec 16, 2000*		at No. 8 Florida; Orange Bowl Basketball Classic	L 71–85	5–3	National Car Rental Center; Sunrise, Florida
Dec 30, 2000*		Monmouth	W 95–69	6–4	Charlotte Y. Martin Centre; Spokane, Washington
Jan 2, 2001*		New Mexico	L 80–81 ^{OT}	6–5	Charlotte Y. Martin Centre; Spokane, Washington
Feb 24, 2001		at San Diego	W 72–69	21–6 (13–1)	Jenny Craig Pavilion; San Diego, CA
2001 West Coast Conference tournament
Mar 3, 2001*	(1)	vs. (8) Saint Mary's; Quarterfinals	W 105–65	22–6	Jenny Craig Pavilion; San Diego, CA
Mar 4, 2001*	(1)	at (4) San Diego; Semifinals	W 76–68	23–6	Jenny Craig Pavilion; San Diego, CA
Mar 5, 2001*	(1)	vs. (3) Santa Clara; Championship	W 80–77	24–6	Jenny Craig Pavilion; San Diego, CA
2001 NCAA tournament
Mar 16, 2001*	(12 S)	vs. (5 S) No. 16 Virginia; First Round	W 86–85	25–6	The Pyramid; Memphis, TN
Mar 18, 2001*	(12 S)	vs. (13 S) Indiana State; Second Round	W 85–68	26–6	The Pyramid; Memphis, TN
Mar 23, 2001*	(12 S)	vs. (1 S) No. 3 Michigan State; Sweet Sixteen	L 62–77	26–7	Georgia Dome; Atlanta, GA
*Non-conference game. ^{#}Rankings from AP Poll. (#) Tournament seedings in parentheses. All times are in Pacific Time.

== Awards and honors ==
- Casey Calvary – WCC Player of the Year
- Mark Few – WCC Coach of the Year
