= 2000–01 Virginia Cavaliers men's basketball team =

American college basketball season

2000–01 Virginia Cavaliers men's basketball

NCAA tournament, Round of 64
- Conference: Atlantic Coast Conference

Ranking
- Coaches: No. 21
- AP: No. 16
- Record: 20–9 (9–7 ACC)
- Head coach: Pete Gillen (3rd season)
- Assistant coaches: Tom Herrion (3rd season); Walt Fuller (3rd season); Scott Shepherd (2nd season)
- Home arena: University Hall

2000–01 ACC men's basketball standings
	Conf.				Overall
Team	W		L	PCT	W		L	PCT
No. 6 North Carolina	13	–	3	.813	26	–	7	.788
No. 1 Duke †	13	–	3	.813	35	–	4	.897
No. 11 Maryland	10	–	6	.625	25	–	11	.694
No. 16 Virginia	9	–	7	.563	20	–	9	.690
Georgia Tech	8	–	8	.500	17	–	13	.567
No. 23 Wake Forest	8	–	8	.500	19	–	11	.633
NC State	5	–	11	.313	13	–	16	.448
Florida State	4	–	12	.250	9	–	21	.300
Clemson	2	–	14	.125	12	–	19	.387
† 2001 ACC tournament winner Rankings from AP Poll

The 2000–01 Virginia Cavaliers men's basketball team represented the University of Virginia during the 2000–01 NCAA Division I men's basketball season. The team was led by third-year head coach Pete Gillen, and played their home games at University Hall in Charlottesville, Virginia as members of the Atlantic Coast Conference.

== Last season ==
The Cavaliers had a record of 20–9, with a conference record of 9–7.

== Roster ==
2000–01 Virginia Cavaliers men's basketball team
Players
Coaches

Pos.	#	Name	Height	Weight	Year	Previous school	Hometown
F	4	Stephane Dondon	6 ft 9 in (2.06 m)	236 lb (107 kg)	Sr	Lycée Robert Schuman	Toulouse, France
G	5	Jason Dowling	6 ft 3 in (1.91 m)	201 lb (91 kg)	Jr	Xaverian HS	Brooklyn, New York
G	11	Majestic Mapp	6 ft 2 in (1.88 m)	176 lb (80 kg)	So	St. Raymond HS	Harlem, New York
G	12	Keith Friel (C)	6 ft 4 in (1.93 m)	195 lb (88 kg)	Sr	Oyster River HS	Durham, New Hampshire
G	13	Donald Hand (C)	5 ft 11.5 in (1.82 m)	192 lb (87 kg)	Sr	Paterson Catholic HS	Paterson, New Jersey
G	15	Greg Lyons	6 ft 4 in (1.93 m)	187 lb (85 kg)	Sr	Holy Cross HS	Mineola, New York
G	21	Roger Mason, Jr.	6 ft 5 in (1.96 m)	201 lb (91 kg)	So	Good Counsel HS	Silver Spring, Maryland
G	22	Josh Hare	6 ft 2 in (1.88 m)	202 lb (92 kg)	Sr	Rockville HS	Vernon, Connecticut
G	23	Maurice Young	6 ft 4 in (1.93 m)	188 lb (85 kg)	Fr	Bishop McNamara HS	Mitchellville, Maryland
F/C	30	Jason Rogers	6 ft 10 in (2.08 m)	225 lb (102 kg)	So	Robert E. Lee HS	Staunton, Virginia
G/F	31	Adam Hall	6 ft 5 in (1.96 m)	195 lb (88 kg)	Jr	Katy HS	Katy, Texas
F	32	J.C. Mathis	6 ft 8 in (2.03 m)	231 lb (105 kg)	Fr	John F. Kennedy HS	Brooklyn, New York
F	33	Chris Williams (C)	6 ft 7 in (2.01 m)	206 lb (93 kg)	Jr	Minor HS	Birmingham, Alabama
F/C	35	Travis Watson	6 ft 8 in (2.03 m)	254 lb (115 kg)	So	Oak Hill	Brookneal, Virginia

Head coach

- Pete Gillen (Fairfield)

Assistant coach(es)

- Tom Herrion (Merrimack)
- Walt Fuller (Drexel)
- Scott Shepherd (Robert Morris)

Legend

- (C) Team captain
- (S) Suspended
- (I) Ineligible
- (W) Walk-on
- Injured
- Current redshirt

Roster
Last update: 6 January 2015

== Schedule ==
Date time, TV	Rank^{#}	Opponent^{#}	Result	Record	Site (attendance) city, state
Exhibition game
Nov. 4; 2:00 pm	No. 25	London Leopards	L 88–89		University Hall; Charlottesville, Virginia
Nov. 12; 1:00 pm		Nantucket Nectars Naturals	W 95–80		University Hall; Charlottesville, Virginia
Regular season
Nov. 17*; 7:30 pm	No. 25	LIU Brooklyn	W 96–50	1–0	University Hall (8,367); Charlottesville, Virginia
Nov. 20*; 7:30 pm	No. 25	Coastal Carolina	W 117–78	2–0	University Hall (7,241); Charlottesville, Virginia
Nov. 24*; 7:00 pm	No. 25	at Virginia Tech	W 64–48	3–0	Cassell Coliseum (10,052); Blacksburg, Virginia
Nov. 29*; 7:00 pm, ESPN	No. 21	Purdue; ACC–Big Ten Challenge	W 98–79	4–0	University Hall (8,296); Charlottesville, Virginia
Dec. 4*; 7:30 pm, FSN South/HTS	No. 16	at VMI	W 89–70	5–0	Cameron Hall (4,109); Lexington, Virginia
Dec. 6*; 7:30 pm	No. 16	Ohio	W 90–71	6–0	University Hall (7,750); Charlottesville, Virginia
Dec. 19*; 7:00 pm, ESPN	No. 14	vs. No. 4 Tennessee; Jimmy V Classic	W 107–89	7–0	Continental Airlines Arena; East Rutherford, New Jersey
Dec. 23*; 4:00 pm, HTS	No. 14	UMBC	W 85–69	8–0	University Hall (8,392); Charlottesville, Virginia
Dec. 28*; 7:30 pm	No. 8	Bucknell	W 99–49	9–0	University Hall (8,392); Charlottesville, Virginia
Dec. 30*; 1:00 pm	No. 8	at Dartmouth	W 102–56	10–0	Leede Arena (2,100); Hanover, New Hampshire
Jan. 2; 7:00 pm, FSN South/HTS	No. 8	at No. 4 Wake Forest	L 73–96	10–1 (0–1)	LJVM Coliseum (11,825); Winston-Salem, North Carolina
Jan. 6; 8:00 pm, Raycom	No. 8	NC State	W 88–81	11–1 (1–1)	University Hall (8,392); Charlottesville, Virginia
Jan. 9; 8:00 pm, Raycom	No. 10	Georgia Tech	L 68–73	11–2 (1–2)	University Hall (8,392); Charlottesville, Virginia
Jan. 13; 3:30 pm, ABC	No. 10	at No. 2 Duke	L 61–103	11–3 (1–3)	Cameron Indoor Stadium (9,314); Durham, North Carolina
Jan. 16; 8:00 pm, Raycom	No. 13	Florida State	W 89–71	12–3 (2–3)	University Hall (8,394); Charlottesville, Virginia
Jan. 20*; 1:00 pm, ABC	No. 13	No. 20 Missouri	W 85–72	13–3 (2–3)	University Hall (8,392); Charlottesville, Virginia
Jan. 24; 7:00 pm, ESPN	No. 13	at No. 5 North Carolina	L 81–88	13–4 (2–4)	Dean Smith Center (21,750); Chapel Hill, North Carolina
Jan. 27; 4:00 pm, Raycom	No. 13	at Clemson	W 104–76	14–4 (3–4)	Littlejohn Coliseum (8,400); Clemson, South Carolina
Jan. 31; 9:00 pm, ESPN	No. 11	No. 9 Maryland	W 99–78	15–4 (4–4)	University Hall (8,392); Charlottesville, Virginia
Feb. 3; 8:00 pm, Raycom	No. 11	No. 16 Wake Forest	W 82–71	16–4 (5–4)	University Hall (8,392); Charlottesville, Virginia
Feb. 7; 7:00 pm, ESPN	No. 6	at NC State	L 80–90	16–5 (5–5)	Raleigh Entertainment & Sports Arena (14,996); Raleigh, North Carolina
Feb. 11; 1:30 pm, Raycom	No. 6	at Georgia Tech	L 56–62	16–6 (5–6)	Alexander Memorial Coliseum (9,005); Atlanta
Feb. 14; 7:00 pm, ESPN	No. 12	No. 3 Duke	W 91–89	17–6 (6–6)	University Hall (8,242); Charlottesville, Virginia
Feb. 17; 4:00 pm, Raycom	No. 12	at Florida State	W 69–66	18–6 (7–6)	Tallahassee-Leon County Civic Center (4,554); Tallahassee, Florida
Feb. 25; 1:30 pm, Raycom	No. 9	No. 2 North Carolina	W 86–66	19–6 (8–6)	University Hall (8,392); Charlottesville, Virginia
Feb. 28; 7:00 pm, FSN South/HTS	No. 7	Clemson	W 84–65	20–6 (9–6)	University Hall (7,867); Charlottesville, Virginia
Mar. 3; 2:00 pm, CBS	No. 7	at No. 16 Maryland	L 67–102	20–7 (9–7)	Cole Field House (14,500); College Park, Maryland
ACC Tournament
Mar. 9; 2:30 pm, Raycom	No. 12	vs. Georgia Tech; ACC Quarterfinals	L 69–74	20–8	Georgia Dome (40,083); Atlanta
NCAA tournament
Mar. 16*; 12:25 pm	No. 16	vs. Gonzaga; NCAA First Round	L 85–86	20–9	The Pyramid; Memphis, Tennessee
*Non-conference game. (#) Tournament seedings in parentheses. All times are in Eastern Time.
