= 2000–01 Wake Forest Demon Deacons men's basketball team =

American college basketball season

2000–01 Wake Forest Demon Deacons men's basketball

NCAA tournament, first round
- Conference: Atlantic Coast Conference

Ranking
- AP: No. 23
- Record: 19–11 (8–8 ACC)
- Head coach: Dave Odom (12th season)
- Assistant coach: Frank Haith (4th season)
- Home arena: LJVM Coliseum

2000–01 ACC men's basketball standings
	Conf.				Overall
Team	W		L	PCT	W		L	PCT
No. 6 North Carolina	13	–	3	.813	26	–	7	.788
No. 1 Duke †	13	–	3	.813	35	–	4	.897
No. 11 Maryland	10	–	6	.625	25	–	11	.694
No. 16 Virginia	9	–	7	.563	20	–	9	.690
Georgia Tech	8	–	8	.500	17	–	13	.567
No. 23 Wake Forest	8	–	8	.500	19	–	11	.633
NC State	5	–	11	.313	13	–	16	.448
Florida State	4	–	12	.250	9	–	21	.300
Clemson	2	–	14	.125	12	–	19	.387
† 2001 ACC tournament winner Rankings from AP Poll

The 2000–01 Wake Forest Demon Deacons men's basketball team represented Wake Forest University as a member of the Atlantic Coast Conference during the 2000–01 NCAA Division I men's basketball season. Led by head coach Dave Odom, the team played their home games at Lawrence Joel Veterans Memorial Coliseum in Winston-Salem, North Carolina. The Demon Deacons finished tied for fifth in the ACC regular season standings. They lost to Maryland in the quarterfinals of the ACC Tournament. Wake Forest received an at-large bid to the NCAA tournament as the No. 7 seed in the Midwest region. The Demon Deacons were defeated by No. 10 seed Butler in the opening round, to end the season with a record of 19–11 (8–8 ACC).

== Roster ==
2000–01 Wake Forest Demon Deacons men's basketball team
Players
Coaches

Pos.	#	Name	Height	Weight	Year	Previous school	Hometown
F	5	Josh Howard	6 ft 7 in (2.01 m)	205 lb (93 kg)	So	Hargrave Military Academy	Winston-Salem, North Carolina
F	25	Darius Songaila	6 ft 9 in (2.06 m)	248 lb (112 kg)	Jr

Head coach

- Dave Odom

Assistant coach(es)

- Frank Haith

Legend

- (C) Team captain
- (S) Suspended
- (I) Ineligible
- (W) Walk-on
- Injured
- Current redshirt

Roster

== Schedule and results ==
Date time, TV	Rank^{#}	Opponent^{#}	Result	Record	Site city, state
Regular Season
Nov 16, 2000*	No. 18	Mount St. Mary's	W 108–61	1–0	LJVM Coliseum; Winston-Salem, North Carolina
Nov 17, 2000*	No. 18	Air Force	W 84–44	2–0	LJVM Coliseum; Winston-Salem, North Carolina
Nov 20, 2000*	No. 17	at Richmond	W 69–61	3–0	Robins Center; Richmond, Virginia
Nov 25, 2000*	No. 17	Campbell	W 86–47	4–0	LJVM Coliseum; Winston-Salem, North Carolina
Nov 28, 2000*	No. 12	at Michigan; ACC–Big Ten Challenge	W 71–60	5–0	Crisler Arena; Ann Arbor, Michigan
Dec 2, 2000*	No. 12	South Carolina State	W 66–55	6–0	LJVM Coliseum; Winston-Salem, North Carolina
Dec 7, 2000*	No. 11	No. 3 Kansas	W 84–53	7–0	LJVM Coliseum (12,143); Winston-Salem, North Carolina
Dec 16, 2000*	No. 6	Georgia	W 75–57	8–0	LJVM Coliseum; Winston-Salem, North Carolina
Dec 18, 2000*	No. 6	Radford	W 92–52	9–0	LJVM Coliseum; Winston-Salem, North Carolina
Dec 21, 2000*	No. 6	at Temple	W 73–65	10–0	Liacouras Center; Philadelphia, Pennsylvania
Dec 29, 2000*	No. 4	Navy	W 90–58	11–0	LJVM Coliseum; Winston-Salem, North Carolina
Jan 2, 2001	No. 4	No. 8 Virginia	W 96–73	12–0 (1–0)	LJVM Coliseum; Winston-Salem, North Carolina
Jan 6, 2001	No. 4	at No. 13 North Carolina	L 69–70	12–1 (1–1)	Dean Smith Center; Chapel Hill, North Carolina
Jan 9, 2001	No. 6	Florida State	W 76–53	13–1 (2–1)	LJVM Coliseum; Winston-Salem, North Carolina
Jan 13, 2001	No. 6	at Georgia Tech	L 89–95 ^{OT}	13–2 (2–2)	Alexander Memorial Coliseum; Atlanta, Georgia
Jan 17, 2001	No. 10	at No. 12 Maryland	L 71–81	13–3 (2–3)	Cole Fieldhouse; College Park, Maryland
Jan 21, 2001	No. 10	Clemson	W 71–63	14–3 (3–3)	LJVM Coliseum; Winston-Salem, North Carolina
Jan 24, 2001	No. 9	at No. 2 Duke	L 62–85	14–4 (3–4)	Cameron Indoor Stadium; Durham, North Carolina
Jan 27, 2001*	No. 9	at Cincinnati	L 72–78 ^{OT}	14–5	Myrl H. Shoemaker Center; Cincinnati, Ohio
Jan 31, 2001	No. 16	NC State	W 74–69 ^{OT}	15–5 (4–4)	LJVM Coliseum; Winston-Salem, North Carolina
Feb 3, 2001	No. 16	at No. 11 Virginia	L 71-82	15–6 (4–5)	University Hall; Charlottesville, Virginia
Feb 6, 2001	No. 19	No. 1 North Carolina	L 74-80	15–7 (4–6)	LJVM Coliseum; Winston-Salem, North Carolina
ACC Tournament
Mar 9, 2001*	No. 22	vs. No. 11 Maryland; Quarterfinals	L 53–71	19–10	Georgia Dome (40,083); Atlanta, Georgia
NCAA Tournament
Mar 16, 2001*	(7 MW) No. 23	vs. (10 MW) Butler; First round	L 63–79	19–11	Kemper Arena (13,550); Kansas City, Missouri
*Non-conference game. ^{#}Rankings from AP Poll. (#) Tournament seedings in parentheses. MW=Midwest. All times are in Eastern Standard Time.
