= 2001 West Coast Conference men's basketball tournament =

- Classification: Division I
- Season: 2000–01
- Teams: 8
- Site: Jenny Craig Pavilion; San Diego, California
- Champions: Gonzaga (4th title)
- Winning coach: Mark Few (2nd title)
- MVP: Dan Dickau (Gonzaga)
- Television: ESPN2, ESPN

2000–01 West Coast Conference men's basketball standings
	Conf.				Overall
Team	W		L	PCT	W		L	PCT
Gonzaga †	13	–	1	.929	26	–	7	.788
Pepperdine	12	–	2	.857	22	–	9	.710
Santa Clara	10	–	4	.714	20	–	12	.625
San Diego	7	–	7	.500	16	–	13	.552
San Francisco	5	–	9	.357	12	–	18	.400
Loyola Marymount	5	–	9	.357	9	–	19	.321
Portland	4	–	10	.286	11	–	17	.393
Saint Mary's	0	–	14	.000	2	–	27	.069
† 2001 WCC tournament winner Rankings from AP Poll

The 2001 West Coast Conference men's basketball tournament took place March 3–5, 2001. All rounds were held in San Diego, California at the Jenny Craig Pavilion. The semifinals were televised by ESPN2. The West Coast Conference Championship Game was televised by ESPN.

The Gonzaga Bulldogs earned their third straight WCC Tournament title and an automatic bid to the 2001 NCAA tournament. Dan Dickau of Gonzaga was named Tournament MVP.

== Bracket ==
Quarter finals Saturday, March 3
1	Gonzaga	105
8	Saint Mary's	65
4	San Diego	62
5	San Francisco	42
(Pairings are reseeded after the first round)
3	Santa Clara	77
6	Loyola Marymount	60
2	Pepperdine	81
7	Portland	71

Semi-finals; Sunday, March 4
1	Gonzaga	76
4	San Diego	68
2	Pepperdine	78
3	Santa Clara	84

Finals; Monday, March 5
1	Gonzaga	80
3	Santa Clara	77

== See also ==
- West Coast Conference
