= 2000–01 Georgia Tech Yellow Jackets men's basketball team =

American college basketball season

2000–01 Georgia Tech Yellow Jackets men's basketball

NCAA tournament, First Round
- Conference: Atlantic Coast Conference
- Record: 17–13 (8–8 ACC)
- Head coach: Paul Hewitt (1st season)
- Home arena: Alexander Memorial Coliseum

2000–01 ACC men's basketball standings
	Conf.				Overall
Team	W		L	PCT	W		L	PCT
No. 6 North Carolina	13	–	3	.813	26	–	7	.788
No. 1 Duke †	13	–	3	.813	35	–	4	.897
No. 11 Maryland	10	–	6	.625	25	–	11	.694
No. 16 Virginia	9	–	7	.563	20	–	9	.690
Georgia Tech	8	–	8	.500	17	–	13	.567
No. 23 Wake Forest	8	–	8	.500	19	–	11	.633
NC State	5	–	11	.313	13	–	16	.448
Florida State	4	–	12	.250	9	–	21	.300
Clemson	2	–	14	.125	12	–	19	.387
† 2001 ACC tournament winner Rankings from AP Poll

The 2000–01 Georgia Tech Yellow Jackets men's basketball team represented the Georgia Institute of Technology during the 2000–01 season. Led by first-year head coach Paul Hewitt, the Jackets finished the regular season with a 16–11 record, before losing to North Carolina in the ACC tournament. Georgia Tech received a bid to the NCAA tournament as No. 8 seed in the West region. The Yellow Jackets were beaten by No. 9 seed Saint Joseph's, 66–62, in the opening round

== Roster ==
2000–01 Georgia Tech Yellow Jackets men's basketball team
Players
Coaches

Pos.	#	Name	Height	Weight	Year	Hometown
C	4	Alvin Jones	6 ft 11 in (2.11 m)	—	Sr	Lakeland, FL
G	24	Marvin Lewis	6 ft 4 in (1.93 m)	205 lb (93 kg)	Fr	Germantown, MD
F	34	Robert Brooks	6 ft 8 in (2.03 m)	210 lb (95 kg)	Fr	Saginaw, MI
F	42	Clarence Moore	6 ft 5 in (1.96 m)	215 lb (98 kg)	Fr	Norco, LA

Head coach

- Paul Hewitt (St. John Fisher)

Assistant coach(es)

Legend

- (C) Team captain
- (S) Suspended
- (I) Ineligible
- (W) Walk-on
- Injured
- Current redshirt

== Schedule and results ==
Date time, TV	Rank^{#}	Opponent^{#}	Result	Record	Site city, state
Regular season
Nov 17, 2000*		Wofford	W 92–49	1–0	Alexander Memorial Coliseum; Atlanta, Georgia
Nov 21, 2000*		Charleston Southern	W 85–62	2–0	Alexander Memorial Coliseum; Atlanta, Georgia
Nov 24, 2000*		Davidson	W 92–61	3–0	Alexander Memorial Coliseum; Atlanta, Georgia
Nov 28, 2000*; ESPN2		at Iowa; ACC–Big Ten Challenge	L 67–85	3–1	Carver-Hawkeye Arena (15,500); Iowa City, Iowa
Dec 2, 2000*		at UCLA	W 72–67	4–1	Pauley Pavilion; Los Angeles, California
Dec 6, 2000*		Georgia	L 70–75	4–2	Alexander Memorial Coliseum; Atlanta, Georgia
Dec 9, 2000*		vs. Kentucky	W 86–84	5–2	State Farm Arena; Atlanta, Georgia
Dec 18, 2000*		vs. Idaho State; Stanford Invitational	W 78–56	6–2	Maples Pavilion; Palo Alto, California
Dec 19, 2000*		at No. 3 Stanford; Stanford Invitational	L 66–80	6–3	Maples Pavilion; Palo Alto, California
ACC tournament
Mar 9, 2001*		No. 12 Virginia; Quarterfinals	W 74–69	17–11	Georgia Dome; Atlanta, Georgia
Mar 10, 2001*		vs. No. 6 North Carolina; Semifinals	L 63–70	17–12	Georgia Dome; Atlanta, Georgia
NCAA tournament
Mar 15, 2001*	(8 W)	vs. (9 W) No. 22 Saint Joseph's; First round	L 62–66	17–13	Cox Arena; San Diego, California
*Non-conference game. ^{#}Rankings from AP Poll. (#) Tournament seedings in parentheses.

== Players in the 2001 NBA draft ==
Round	Pick	Player	NBA club
2	57	Alvin Jones	Philadelphia 76ers
