= 2000–01 Maryland Terrapins men's basketball team =

American college basketball season

2000–01 Maryland Terrapins men's basketball

BB&T Classic Champions

NCAA tournament, Final Four
- Conference: Atlantic Coast Conference

Ranking
- Coaches: No. 4
- AP: No. 11
- Record: 25–11 (10–6 ACC)
- Head coach: Gary Williams
- Assistant coach: Billy Hahn; Dave Dickerson; Jimmy Patsos; Troy Wainwright
- Home arena: Cole Field House

2000–01 ACC men's basketball standings
	Conf.				Overall
Team	W		L	PCT	W		L	PCT
No. 6 North Carolina	13	–	3	.813	26	–	7	.788
No. 1 Duke †	13	–	3	.813	35	–	4	.897
No. 11 Maryland	10	–	6	.625	25	–	11	.694
No. 16 Virginia	9	–	7	.563	20	–	9	.690
Georgia Tech	8	–	8	.500	17	–	13	.567
No. 23 Wake Forest	8	–	8	.500	19	–	11	.633
NC State	5	–	11	.313	13	–	16	.448
Florida State	4	–	12	.250	9	–	21	.300
Clemson	2	–	14	.125	12	–	19	.387
† 2001 ACC tournament winner Rankings from AP Poll

The 2000–2001 Maryland Terrapins men's basketball team represented the University of Maryland in the 2000–2001 college basketball season as a member of the Atlantic Coast Conference (ACC). The team was led by head coach Gary Williams and played their home games at the Cole Field House. They were the first team to reach the Final Four in school history.

== Pre-season ==
=== Accolades ===
Team
ESPN/USA Today ranked No. 7
AP ranked No. 5

Terence Morris
Naismith Award Player of the Year candidate
Wooden Award Player of the Year candidate
Playboy First Team All-American

Lonny Baxter, Juan Dixon
Naismith Award Player of the Year candidate
Wooden Award Player of the Year candidate

== Roster ==
2000–01 Maryland Terrapins men's basketball team
Players
Coaches

Pos.	#	Name	Height	Weight	Year	Hometown
G/F	1	Byron Mouton	6 ft 6 in (1.98 m)	215 lb (98 kg)	Jr	Rayne, Louisiana
G	3	Juan Dixon	6 ft 3 in (1.91 m)	164 lb (74 kg)	Jr	Baltimore, Maryland
G	4	Earl Badu	6 ft 0 in (1.83 m)	160 lb (73 kg)	Jr	Baltimore, Maryland
G	11	Calvin McCall	6 ft 3 in (1.91 m)	200 lb (91 kg)	So	Orlando, Florida
G	12	Drew Nicholas	6 ft 3 in (1.91 m)	160 lb (73 kg)	So	Hempstead, New York
G/F	15	Danny Miller	6 ft 8 in (2.03 m)	220 lb (100 kg)	Jr	Mt. Holly, New Jersey
F	21	LaRon Cephas	6 ft 7 in (2.01 m)	217 lb (98 kg)	Sr	Wilmington, Delaware
G	25	Steve Blake	6 ft 3 in (1.91 m)	160 lb (73 kg)	So	Miami Lakes, Florida
F/C	33	Mike Mardesich	7 ft 0 in (2.13 m)	244 lb (111 kg)	Sr	Boston, Massachusetts
F/C	35	Lonny Baxter	6 ft 8 in (2.03 m)	260 lb (118 kg)	Jr	Silver Spring, Maryland
C	40	Matt Slaninka	7 ft 4 in (2.24 m)	257 lb (117 kg)	RS Fr	Olney, Maryland
F	44	Terence Morris	6 ft 9 in (2.06 m)	221 lb (100 kg)	Sr	Frederick, Maryland
F	45	Tahj Holden	6 ft 10 in (2.08 m)	247 lb (112 kg)	So	Red Bank, New Jersey
F/C	54	Chris Wilcox	6 ft 10 in (2.08 m)	210 lb (95 kg)	Fr	Whiteville, North Carolina

Head coach

- Gary Williams (Maryland)

Assistant coach(es)

- Billy Hahn (Maryland)
- Dave Dickerson (Maryland)
- Jimmy Patsos (Catholic)
- Troy Wainwright (Maryland)

Legend

- (C) Team captain
- (S) Suspended
- (I) Ineligible
- (W) Walk-on
- Injured
- Current redshirt

Roster
Last update: May 9, 2025

== Season Recap ==
=== Accolades ===
Juan Dixon
1st Team All-ACC
Lonny Baxter
NCAA West Regional MVP
2nd Team All-ACC

== Schedule ==
Date time, TV	Rank^{#}	Opponent^{#}	Result	Record	High points	High rebounds	High assists	Site (attendance) city, state
Exhibition
November 03, 2000*	No. 6	Basketball Travelers	W 110–77	–	20 – Tied	10 – Baxter	11 – Blake	Cole Field House (12,206); College Park, Maryland
November 15, 2000*	No. 6	California All-Stars	W 91–55	–	21 – Dixon	7 – Tied	7 – Blake	Cole Field House (11,150); College Park, Maryland
Non-conference regular season
November 20, 2000*; 9:00 PM, ESPN2	No. 6	vs. Louisville; Maui Invitational – First Round	W 95–73	1–0	24 – Morris	9 – Morris	9 – Blake	Lahaina Civic Center (2,500); Lahaina, Hawai'i
November 21, 2000*; 7:15 pm, ESPN	No. 6	vs. No. 8 Illinois; Maui Invitational – Semifinals	L 80–90	1–1	24 – Morris	9 – Morris	9 – Blake	Lahaina Civic Center (2,500); Lahaina, Hawai'i
November 22, 2000*	No. 6	vs. Dayton; Maui Invitational – 3rd Place Game	L 71–77	1–2	20 – Baxter	6 – Tied	6 – Tied	Lahaina Civic Center (2,500); Lahaina, Hawai'i
November 29, 2000*; 9:00 pm, ESPN	No. 13	at No. 23 Wisconsin; ACC – Big Ten Challenge	L 75–78 ^{OT}	1–3	14 – Mouton	7 – Dixon	7 – Blake	Bradley Center (7,157); Milwaukee, Wisconsin
December 02, 2000*; 1:00 pm, Raycom	No. 13	vs. Michigan; BB&T Classic – Semifinals	W 82–51	2–3	19 – Dixon	7 – Mardesich	5 – Blake	MCI Center (16,681); Washington, D.C.
December 03, 2000*; 5:30 pm, Raycom	No. 13	vs. George Washington; BB&T Classic – Championship Game	W 71–63	3–3	17 – Mouton	7 – Morris	6 – Blake	MCI Center (16,826); Washington, D.C.
December 06, 2000*	No. 19	Stony Brook	W 107–59	4–3	19 – Tied	7 – Baxter	13 – Blake	Cole Field House (13,206); College Park, Maryland
December 09, 2000*; 7:30 pm, HTS	No. 19	at Penn	W 87–81	5–3	23 – Dixon	8 – Baxter	3 – Tied	The Palestra (8,722); Philadelphia, Pennsylvania
December 13, 2000*	No. 20	UMBC	W 93–67	6–3	23 – Dixon	12 – Baxter	10 – Blake	Cole Field House (13,021); College Park, Maryland
December 23, 2000*; 1:30 pm, HTS	No. 20	Norfolk State	W 123–79	7–3	32 – Baxter	8 – Tied	9 – Blake	Cole Field House (13,687); College Park, Maryland
December 27, 2000*	No. 18	Chicago State	W 117–55	8–3	24 – Dixon	8 – Morris	12 – Blake	Cole Field House (13,506); College Park, Maryland
December 30, 2000*; 1:30 pm, HTS	No. 18	Maryland Eastern Shore	W 105–53	9–3	28 – Mouton	8 – Baxter	8 – Blake	Cole Field House (13,107); College Park, Maryland
ACC Regular Season
January 02, 2001; 8:00 pm, Raycom	No. 17	at Clemson	W 104–92	10–3 (1–0)	26 – Morris	4 – Tied	6 – Tied	Littlejohn Coliseum (7,500); Clemson, South Carolina
January 06, 2001; 1:30 pm, Raycom	No. 17	Georgia Tech	W 93–80	11–3 (2–0)	28 – Dixon	13 – Morris	9 – Blake	Cole Field House (14,500); College Park, Maryland
January 10, 2001; 7:00 pm, ESPN	No. 14	No. 9 North Carolina	L 83–86	11–4 (2–1)	22 – Dixon	12 – Morris	5 – Morris	Cole Field House (14,500); College Park, Maryland
January 14, 2001; 1:30 pm, Raycom	No. 14	at Florida State	W 76–55	12–4 (3–1)	19 – Dixon	14 – Morris	4 – Nicholas	Leon County Civic Center (6,899); Tallahassee, Florida
January 17, 2001; 9:00 pm, ESPN	No. 12	No. 10 Wake Forest	W 81–71	13–4 (4–1)	30 – Dixon	15 – Baxter	4 – Blake	Cole Field House (14,500); College Park, Maryland
January 21, 2001; 3:30 pm, ABC	No. 12	at NC State	W 75–61	14–4 (5–1)	20 – Morris	10 – Morris	7 – Miller	Entertainment and Sports Arena (17,428); Raleigh, North Carolina
January 27, 2001; 8:00 pm, ESPN	No. 8	No. 2 Duke; Rivalry Game	L 96–98 ^{OT}	14–5 (5–2)	17 – Dixon	12 – Mouton	9 – Blake	Cole Field House (14,500); College Park, Maryland
January 31, 2001; 9:00 pm, ESPN	No. 9	at No. 11 Virginia	L 78–99	14–6 (5–3)	15 – Baxter	15 – Morris	9 – Blake	University Hall (8,392); Charlottesville, Virginia
February 04, 2001; 1:00 pm, Raycom	No. 9	Clemson	W 69–54	15–6 (6–3)	18 – Morris	13 – Baxter	5 – Blake	Cole Field House (14,500); College Park, Maryland
February 06, 2001; 7:00 pm, HTS	No. 13	at Georgia Tech	L 62–72	15–7 (6–4)	18 – Dixon	13 – Morris	6 – Blake	Alexander Memorial Coliseum (8,802); Atlanta, Georgia
February 10, 2001; 1:00 pm, CBS	No. 13	at No. 1 North Carolina	L 82–96	15–8 (6–5)	19 – Baxter	8 – Tied	6 – Morris	Dean E. Smith Center (21,750); Chapel Hill, North Carolina
February 14, 2001; 9:00 pm, Raycom	No. 17	Florida State	L 71–74	15–9 (6–6)	14 – Dixon	6 – Tied	10 – Blake	Cole Field House (14,282); College Park, Maryland
February 17, 2001	No. 17	at No. 23 Wake Forest	W 73–57	16–9 (7–6)	19 – Baxter	14 – Baxter	4 – Blake	LJVM Coliseum (13,800); Winston-Salem, North Carolina
February 20, 2001; 8:00 pm, ESPN2	No. 20	NC State	W 95–66	17–9 (8–6)	30 – Dixon	7 – Baxter	9 – Blake	Cole Field House (14,500); College Park, Maryland
February 24, 2001*; 3:30 pm, ABC	No. 20	No. 16 Oklahoma	W 68–60	18–9	23 – Dixon	7 – Baxter	5 – Blake	Cole Field House (14,500); College Park, Maryland
February 27, 2001; 8:00 pm, Raycom	No. 16	at No. 2 Duke	W 91–80	19–9 (9–6)	28 – Dixon	12 – Morris	11 – Blake	Cameron Indoor Stadium (9,314); Durham, North Carolina
March 03, 2001; 2:00 pm, CBS	No. 16	No. 7 Virginia	W 102–67	20–9 (10–6)	21 – Dixon	13 – Morris	10 – Nicholas	Cole Field House (14,500); College Park, Maryland
ACC Tournament
March 09, 2001*; 9:30 pm, Raycom	(3) No. 11	vs. (6) No. 22 Wake Forest; Quarterfinals	W 71–53	21–9	15 – Dixon	11 – Baxter	9 – Blake	Georgia Dome (40,083); Atlanta, Georgia
March 10, 2001*; 4:15 pm, ESPN	(3) No. 11	vs. (2) No. 3 Duke; Semifinal	L 82–84	21–10	17 – Dixon	12 – Baxter	11 – Blake	Georgia Dome (40,083); Atlanta, Georgia
NCAA Tournament
March 15, 2001*; 3:05 pm, CBS	(3 W) No. 11	vs. (14 W) George Mason; First Round	W 83–80	22–10	22 – Tied	6 – Baxter	6 – Blake	BSU Pavilion (10,824); Boise, Idaho
March 07, 2001*; 3:20 pm, CBS	(3 W) No. 11	vs. (11 W) Georgia State; Second Round	W 79–60	23–10	19 – Baxter	14 – Baxter	7 – Blake	BSU Pavilion (11,250); Boise, Idaho
March 22, 2001*; 7:55 p,, CBS	(3 W) No. 11	vs. (10 W) No. 21 Georgetown; Sweet Sixteen	W 76–66	24–10	26 – Baxter	14 – Baxter	5 – Blake	Arrowhead Pond of Anaheim (18,008); Anaheim, California
March 24, 2001*; 4:40 pm, CBS	(3 W) No. 11	vs. (1 W) No. 2 Stanford; Elite Eight	W 87–73	25–10	24 – Baxter	10 – Morris	7 – Blake	Arrowhead Pond of Anaheim (18,008); Anaheim, California
March 31, 2001*; 8:15 pm, CBS	(3 W) No. 11	vs. (E 1) No. 1 Duke; Final Four	L 84–95	25–11	19 – Dixon	10 – Baxter	5 – Blake	The Metrodome (45,406); Minneapolis, Minnesota
*Non-conference game. ^{#}Rankings from AP Poll. (#) Tournament seedings in parentheses. All times are in Eastern Time. W = West, E = East.
