= 2000–01 Princeton Tigers men's basketball team =

American college basketball season

2000–01 Princeton Tigers men's basketball

Ivy League Champion

2001 NCAA Men's Division I Tournament, Fifteen Seed, Round of 64
- Conference: Ivy League
- Record: 16–11 (11–3, 1st Ivy League)
- Head coach: John Thompson III (1st season)
- Assistant coach: Mike Brennan
- Captain: Nate Walton
- Home arena: Jadwin Gymnasium

2000–01 Ivy League men's basketball standings
	Conf.				Overall
Team	W		L	PCT	W		L	PCT
Princeton	11	–	3	.786	16	–	11	.593
Brown	9	–	5	.643	15	–	12	.556
Penn	9	–	5	.643	12	–	17	.414
Harvard	7	–	7	.500	14	–	12	.538
Columbia	7	–	7	.500	12	–	15	.444
Yale	7	–	7	.500	10	–	17	.370
Dartmouth	3	–	11	.214	8	–	19	.296
Cornell	3	–	11	.214	7	–	20	.259
Rankings from AP Poll

The 2000–01 Princeton Tigers men's basketball team represented Princeton University in intercollegiate college basketball during the 2000–01 NCAA Division I men's basketball season. The head coach was John Thompson III and the team captain was Nate Walton. The team played its home games in the Jadwin Gymnasium on the university campus in Princeton, New Jersey, and was the champion of the Ivy League, which earned them an invitation to the 64-team 2001 NCAA Division I men's basketball tournament where they were seeded fifteenth in the South Region. Prior to the season on September 7, Thompson replaced Northwestern-bound Bill Carmody, who had achieved the Ivy League's highest career winning percentage, as head coach. The team made the sixth of what would become seven consecutive postseason appearances.

Using the Princeton offense under first year coach Thompson, the team posted a 16–11 overall record and an 11–3 conference record. The season marked the thirteenth consecutive time and 31st of 33 that either Penn or Princeton had won or shared the Ivy League regular season title. In its March 16, 2001 NCAA Division I men's basketball tournament South Regional first-round game against the North Carolina Tar Heels at the Superdome New Orleans, Louisiana the team lost by a 70–48 margin.

The team was led by first team All-Ivy League selection Walton and Ivy League Men's Basketball Rookie of the Year Konrad Wysocki. C.J. Chapman made 50.0% of his three-point field goals in his conference games to earn the Ivy League statistical championship. Future Secretary of Defense Pete Hegseth was a reserve on this team.

== Schedule and results ==
The team posted a 16–11 (11-3 Ivy League) record.

Date time, TV	Rank^{#}	Opponent^{#}	Result	Record	Site city, state
Regular season
Nov 14, 2000*		at No. 2 Duke; Preseason NIT	L 50–87	0–1	Cameron Indoor Stadium; Durham, North Carolina
Nov 25, 2000*		at Monmouth	L 59–70	0–2	Boylan Gymnasium; West Long Branch, New Jersey
Dec 1, 2000*		vs. Weber State; First Merchants Classic	W 65–60 ^{OT}	1–2	Worthen Arena; Muncie, Indiana
Dec 2, 2000*		at Ball State; First Merchants Classic	W 49–47	2–2	Worthen Arena; Muncie, Indiana
Dec 6, 2000*		at Lafayette	L 73–80	2–3	Kirby Sports Center; Easton, Pennsylvania
Dec 9, 2000*		Xavier	W 58–52	3–3	Jadwin Gymnasium; Princeton, New Jersey
Dec 14, 2000*		Rutgers	L 44–46	3–4	Jadwin Gymnasium; Princeton, New Jersey
Dec 18, 2000*		at TCU	L 45–76	3–5	Daniel-Meyer Coliseum; Fort Worth, Texas
Dec 23, 2000*		at Holy Cross	W 47–46	4–5	Hart Center; Worcester, Massachusetts
Dec 26, 2000*		vs. Penn State	L 52–65	4–6	Madison Square Garden; New York, New York
Dec 27, 2000*		vs. Rutgers	L 39–53	4–7	Madison Square Garden; New York, New York
Jan 12, 2001		Cornell	W 78–53	5–7 (1–0)	Jadwin Gymnasium; Princeton, New Jersey
Jan 13, 2001		Columbia	W 53–36	6–7 (2–0)	Jadwin Gymnasium; Princeton, New Jersey
Jan 29, 2001*		College of New Jersey	W 69–59	7–7	Jadwin Gymnasium; Princeton, New Jersey
Feb 2, 2001		Brown	W 66–62	8–7 (3–0)	Jadwin Gymnasium; Princeton, New Jersey
Feb 3, 2001		Yale	W 62–49	9–7 (4–0)	Jadwin Gymnasium; Princeton, New Jersey
Feb 9, 2001		at Dartmouth	L 56–57	9–8 (4–1)	Leede Arena; Hanover, New Hampshire
Feb 10, 2001		at Harvard	W 69–67	10–8 (5–1)	Lavietes Pavilion; Cambridge, Massachusetts
Feb 13, 2001		at Penn	W 67–53	11–8 (6–1)	The Palestra; Philadelphia, Pennsylvania
Feb 16, 2001		at Columbia	L 42–59	11–9 (6–2)	Levien Gymnasium; New York, New York
Feb 17, 2001		at Cornell	L 49–66	11–10 (6–3)	Newman Arena; Ithaca, New York
Feb 23, 2001		Harvard	W 62–48	12–10 (7–3)	Jadwin Gymnasium; Princeton, New Jersey
Feb 24, 2001		Dartmouth	W 68–52	13–10 (8–3)	Jadwin Gymnasium; Princeton, New Jersey
Mar 2, 2001		at Yale	W 60–49	14–10 (9–3)	John J. Lee Amphitheater; New Haven, Connecticut
Mar 3, 2001		at Brown	W 64–55	15–10 (10–3)	Pizzitola Sports Center; Providence, Rhode Island
Mar 6, 2001		Penn	W 68–52	16–10 (11–3)	Jadwin Gymnasium; Princeton, New Jersey
NCAA tournament
Mar 16, 2001*	(15)	vs. (2) No. 6 North Carolina	L 48–70	16–11	Louisiana Superdome; New Orleans, Louisiana
*Non-conference game. ^{#}Rankings from AP Poll. (#) Tournament seedings in parentheses. S=South. All times are in EST.
