= Jay Williams (basketball) =

American basketball player (born 1981)

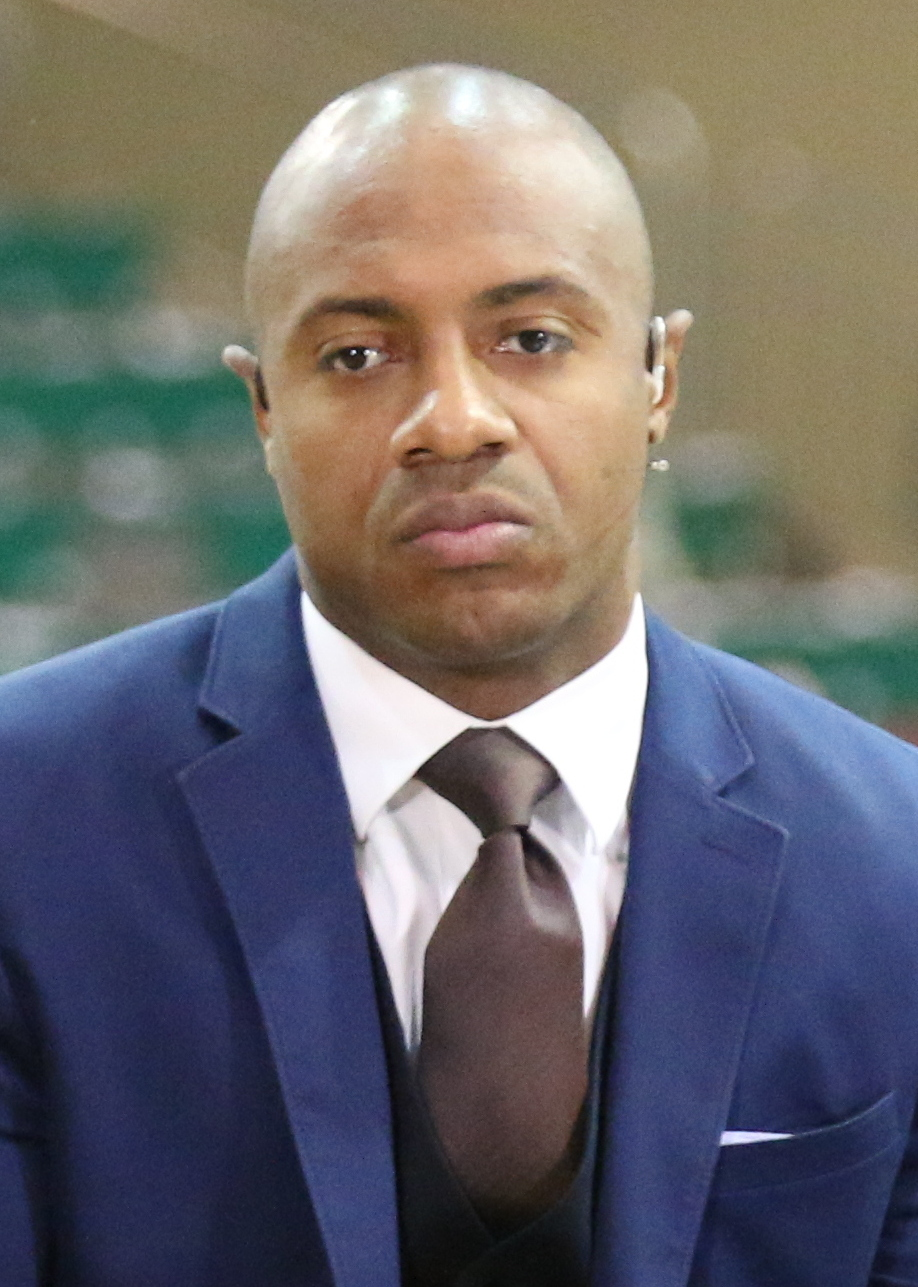
- Williams in 2013

Personal information
- Born: September 10, 1981 (age 45) Plainfield, New Jersey, U.S.
- Listed height: 6 ft 2 in (1.88 m)
- Listed weight: 195 lb (88 kg)

Career information
- High school: St. Joseph (Metuchen, New Jersey)
- College: Duke (1999–2002)
- NBA draft: 2002: 1st round, 2nd overall pick
- Drafted by: Chicago Bulls
- Playing career: 2002–2004, 2006
- Position: Point guard
- Number: 22

Career history
- 2002–2003: Chicago Bulls
- 2006: Austin Toros

Career highlights
- NBA All-Rookie Second Team (2003); NCAA champion (2001); National college player of the year (2002); 2× NABC Player of the Year (2001, 2002); 2× Consensus first-team All-American (2001, 2002); 2× First-team All-ACC (2001, 2002); Third-team All-ACC (2000); ACC tournament MVP (2000); ACC All-Freshman team (2000); No. 22 retired by Duke Blue Devils; McDonald's All-American (1999); First-team Parade All-American (1999)
- Stats at NBA.com
- Stats at Basketball Reference
- Collegiate Basketball Hall of Fame

Jason David Williams (born September 10, 1981) is an American former professional basketball player and television analyst. He played college basketball for the Duke Blue Devils and professionally for the Chicago Bulls in the National Basketball Association (NBA).

Then known as Jason Williams, he won the 2001 NCAA Championship with Duke, and was named NABC Player of the Year in 2001 and 2002. He was drafted second overall in the 2002 NBA draft by the Bulls. He was known as Jay on joining the Bulls to avoid confusion with two other players with similar names in the NBA at the time. His playing career was effectively ended by a motorcycle crash in 2003. He last played with the Austin Toros of the NBA Development League in 2006 when his season was ended early due to lingering physical effects from his accident.

Since retiring, Williams has worked as an analyst for ESPN. Initially working on ESPN College Basketball, he was reassigned to the NBA full-time with his addition on ESPN's NBA Countdown program in 2019.

== High school ==
Williams grew up in Plainfield, New Jersey, and attended St. Joseph High School in Metuchen, graduating in 1999. He not only excelled at basketball, but took an active interest in other activities, most notably chess. His nickname in high school was "Jay Dubs". Williams also played junior varsity soccer during his freshman year and was the state volleyball player of the year during his senior year. In basketball that year, Williams was named a First Team All-State Player in New Jersey, the New Jersey Player of the Year, a Parade All-American, a USA Today first team All-American, and a McDonald's All-American, where he competed in the Slam Dunk Contest and the McDonald's All-American Game, scoring 20 points in the contest. In his last year of high school he averaged 19 points, 7.0 assists, 4.2 rebounds and 3.7 steals per game; he had started each of the 4 years he spent at St. Joseph, and set school records in total points (1,977) and steals (407). He was also named the recipient of the 1999 Morgan Wootten Award for his basketball achievements and his work in the classroom, where he maintained a 3.6 GPA.

== College career ==
At Duke University, Williams, a 6-foot-2-inch (1.88 m), 195-pound (88 kg) point guard, became one of the few freshmen in school history to average double figures in scoring and was named ACC Rookie of the Year and National Freshman of the Year by The Sporting News, averaging 15.5 points, 6.5 assists and 4.2 rebounds per contest. He was also a first team Freshman All-American by Basketball Times.

The next season Williams started all 39 games and led the Devils to the 2001 NCAA National Championship, earning NABC Player of the Year honors. His 841 points broke Dick Groat's 49-year Duke record for points in a season, while he led all tournament scorers with a 25.7 points per game average. Williams also set the NCAA Tournament record for three-pointers attempted (66), while also making 132 three-point field goals—good for the sixth-highest total in NCAA history. His 21.6 points per game led the ACC and made him the first Duke player since Danny Ferry (1989) to lead the league in scoring. His 6.1 assists were good for second in the league, while he also ranked second in three-point field goal percentage (.427) and first in three-pointers made (3.4 per game). Williams was widely considered the best player in college basketball, earning both the prestigious Naismith Award and Wooden Award as College Basketball's Player of the Year in 2002. He graduated with a degree in sociology in 2002, and left Duke with 2,079 points, good for sixth all-time, and with his jersey number 22 retired at Senior Day.

He had 36 double-figure scoring games in a single season (tied for 5th-most in Duke history as of March 28, 2010, with Jon Scheyer, Shane Battier, and JJ Redick).

In 2001–02, Williams, Carlos Boozer, and Mike Dunleavy Jr. each scored at least 600 points for the season, a feat only matched at Duke by Jon Scheyer, Kyle Singler, and Nolan Smith in the 2009–10 season. Williams (841) and Shane Battier (778) on the 2001 national championship team were one of only two Duke duos to each score over 700 points in a season, the other duo being Scheyer (728) and Singler (707) in the 2009–10 season.

== Professional career ==
=== Chicago Bulls (2002–2004) ===
Williams was selected by the Chicago Bulls with the second overall pick in the 2002 NBA draft, after Yao Ming was selected by the Houston Rockets. Williams was a starter in the Bulls' line-up for most of the 2002–03 NBA season. Although his performance was inconsistent and he competed for playing time with Jamal Crawford, he showed signs of promise, including posting a triple-double in a win over the New Jersey Nets. Williams' final NBA game was played on April 15, 2003, in a 115–106 win over the Philadelphia 76ers in which he recorded 15 points, 7 assists, 2 rebounds, and 1 steal.

==== Motorcycle accident ====
On the night of June 19, 2003, Williams was riding a motorcycle at a fast speed on the North Side of Chicago. He crashed his Yamaha YZF-R6 motorcycle into a streetlight at the intersection of Honore Street and Fletcher Street near the Roscoe Village neighborhood. Williams was not wearing a helmet, nor was he licensed to ride a motorcycle in Illinois, and he was also violating the terms of his NBA Bulls contract by riding a motorcycle. Williams' injuries included a fractured pelvis, a severed main nerve in his leg, and three torn ligaments in his left knee, including the ACL. He required lengthy physical therapy to regain the use of his leg. A week after the motorcycle crash, the Bulls drafted point guard Kirk Hinrich. When it became clear Williams would not be returning to the Bulls for a long time, if at all, because of his severe injuries, the Bulls chose to waive him and drop him from the roster. This left the team without their top draft pick from just a year prior. Legally, the Bulls did not have to pay Williams any remaining salary at all because his severe injuries occurred while he violated the terms of his contract by riding a motorcycle; however, the Bulls organization decided to give Williams $3 million when they waived him so Williams could use the funds toward his rehabilitation expenses. Williams apologized to the Bulls organization for violating the terms of his contract and severely injuring himself. He stated at the time that he would work hard in his physical rehabilitation so that he could make a return to the Bulls. In his 2016 memoir, he mentioned that he became addicted to illegal painkillers as well as other drugs after the accident.

=== Austin Toros (2006) ===
On September 28, 2006, the New Jersey Nets announced that they had signed Williams to a non-guaranteed contract. However, on October 22, the Nets released him.

Williams then signed with the Austin Toros of the NBA Development League, but he played in just three games for the club. On December 30, 2006, the Toros waived him due to injury. Williams subsequently announced that he had no plans to resume his basketball career.

== National team career ==
During his basketball playing career, Williams also represented the senior USA national basketball team. He was a part of the US team that finished in 6th place at the 2002 FIBA World Cup, which was held in Indianapolis. In seven games played during the tournament, Williams averaged 3.9 points, 1.0 rebounds, 1.6 assists, and 0.9 steals, in 6.6 minutes per game.

== Post-basketball career ==
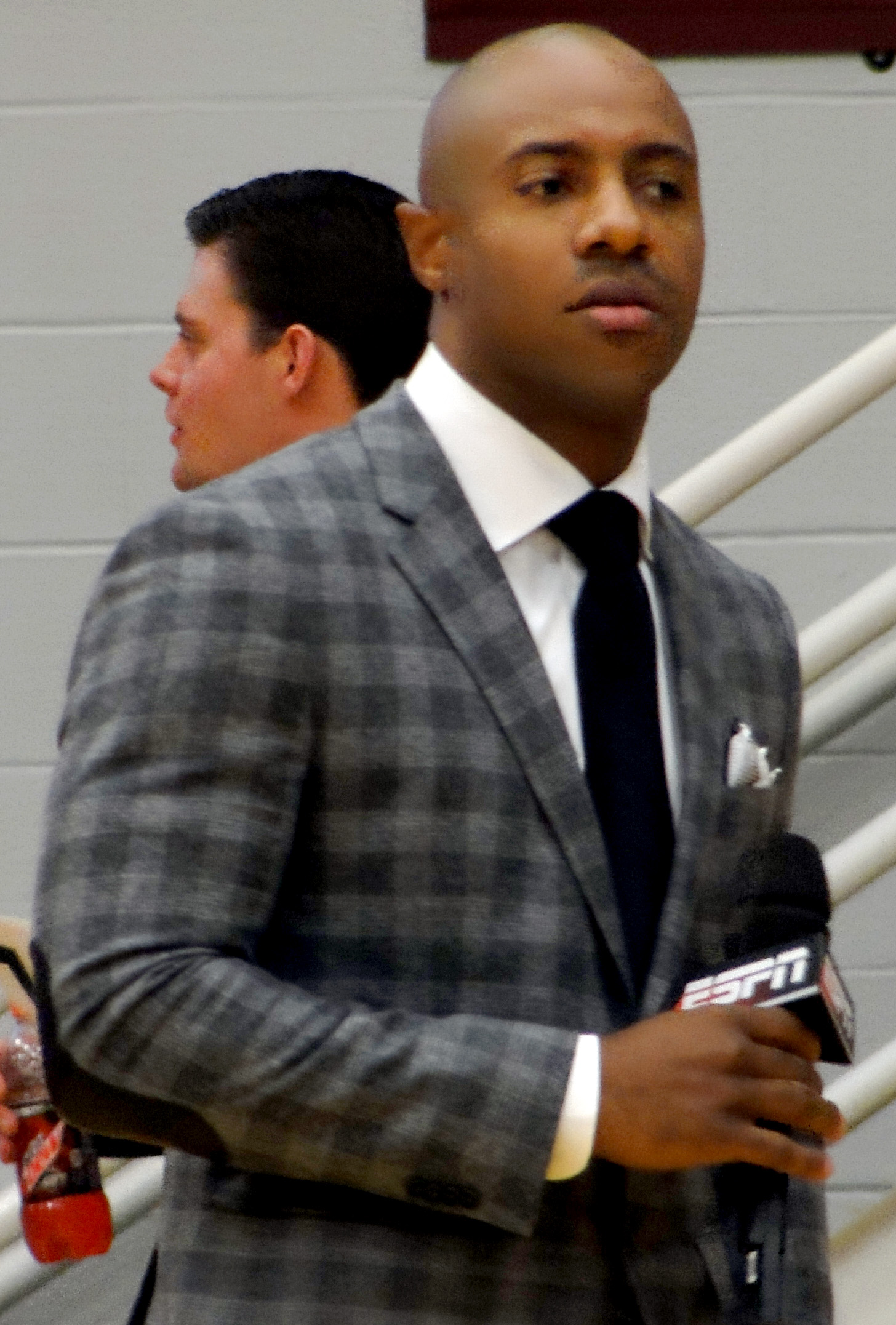
Williams on ESPN in January 2011

Williams works for ESPN as an NBA analyst. Previously, Williams covered college basketball for the network. He has also done motivational speaking and worked as an analyst on CBS College Sports Network during the 2008 NCAA men's basketball tournament. He was a recruiter for sports agency Ceruzzi Sports and Entertainment from 2007 to 2009. In 2016, Williams released his autobiography, Life Is Not an Accident: A Memoir of Reinvention. Presently, Williams is the Spokesperson of Visions Federal Credit Union, headquartered in Endwell, New York. He was also an announcer in NBA Live 19.

According to a May 2020 article on BlackEnterprise.com, Williams co-founded a management consulting company named Simatree, serves as a partial owner of The CabinNYC restaurant, works as an advisor to a digital marketing agency, and partners with EPIC Insurance to provide financial guidance to athletes and celebrities.

In 2021, Williams began hosting a podcast series titled The Limits with Jay Williams for NPR.

Williams co-hosted the "Keyshawn, JWill & Max Show" national morning show on ESPN Radio, with Keyshawn Johnson and Max Kellerman. In June 2023, it was canceled by ESPN as a part of their budget cuts.

== Personal life ==
Williams is a cousin of former NFL wide receiver David Tyree.

He is married to Nikki Bonacorsi and is the father of one daughter and one son.

== Career statistics ==
Legend
GP	Games played	GS	Games started	MPG	Minutes per game
FG%	Field goal percentage	3P%	3-point field goal percentage	FT%	Free throw percentage
RPG	Rebounds per game	APG	Assists per game	SPG	Steals per game
BPG	Blocks per game	PPG	Points per game	**Bold**	Career high

=== NBA ===
==== Regular season ====
Year	Team	GP	GS	MPG	FG%	3P%	FT%	RPG	APG	SPG	BPG	PPG
2002–03	Chicago	75	54	26.1	.399	.322	.640	2.6	4.7	1.1	.2	10.5

=== College ===
Year	Team	GP	GS	MPG	FG%	3P%	FT%	RPG	APG	SPG	BPG	PPG
1999–00	Duke	34	34	**34.0**	.419	.354	**.685**	**4.2**	**6.5**	**2.4**	**.2**	15.5
2000–01	Duke	**39**	**39**	31.8	**.473**	**.427**	.659	3.3	6.1	2.0	.1	**21.6**
2001–02	Duke	35	35	33.6	.457	.383	.676	3.5	5.3	2.2	.1	21.3
Career		108	108	33.1	.453	.393	.671	3.7	6.0	2.2	.1	19.6
