= 2001 ACC men's basketball tournament =

- 2001 ACC Tournament logo
- Classification: Division I
- Season: 2000–01
- Teams: 9
- Site: Georgia Dome; Atlanta, Georgia
- Champions: Duke (12th title)
- Winning coach: Mike Krzyzewski (6th title)
- MVP: Shane Battier (Duke)

The 2001 Atlantic Coast Conference men's basketball tournament took place from March 8 to 11 in Atlanta, Georgia, at the Georgia Dome. Duke won the tournament for the third year in a row, defeating North Carolina in the championship game. Duke's Shane Battier won the tournament's Most Valuable Player award.

Duke went on to win the 2001 NCAA Division I men's basketball tournament in the following weeks. It was their third national championship. Duke defeated ACC rival Maryland in the Final Four. Duke also defeated Maryland in the ACC semifinal round.

The 2001 ACC Tournament Championship Game pitted the #1 and #2 seeds against each other for the second consecutive year.

The 2001 edition of the ACC Tournament was the first one held in the Georgia Dome. The tournament had previously been held in Atlanta at the Omni. The tournament returned to the Georgia Dome in 2009. The tournament format reverted to the format last used in 1997, featuring a first round game between the two lowest seeds, with the remaining teams receiving byes to the quarterfinals. The previous format had the #1 seed facing the #9 seed in the first round, with the winner receiving a bye to the semifinals, while the #7 and #8 seeds played in the first round to determine which would join the #2 to #6 seeds in quarterfinals.

2000–01 ACC men's basketball standings
	Conf.				Overall
Team	W		L	PCT	W		L	PCT
No. 6 North Carolina	13	–	3	.813	26	–	7	.788
No. 1 Duke †	13	–	3	.813	35	–	4	.897
No. 11 Maryland	10	–	6	.625	25	–	11	.694
No. 16 Virginia	9	–	7	.563	20	–	9	.690
Georgia Tech	8	–	8	.500	17	–	13	.567
No. 23 Wake Forest	8	–	8	.500	19	–	11	.633
NC State	5	–	11	.313	13	–	16	.448
Florida State	4	–	12	.250	9	–	21	.300
Clemson	2	–	14	.125	12	–	19	.387
† 2001 ACC tournament winner Rankings from AP Poll

== Bracket ==
First round March 8
8	Florida State	64
9	Clemson	66

Quarterfinals; March 9
1	#6 North Carolina	99
9	Clemson	81
4	#12 Virginia	69
5	Georgia Tech	74
2	#3 Duke	76
7	NC State	61
3	#11 Maryland	71
6	#22 Wake Forest	53

Semifinals; March 10
1	#6 North Carolina	70
5	Georgia Tech	63
2	#3 Duke	84
3	#11 Maryland	82

Championship Game; March 11
1	#6 North Carolina	53
2	#3 Duke	79

AP rankings at time of tournament
