= 2000–01 Duke Blue Devils men's basketball team =

American college basketball season

2000–01 Duke Blue Devils men's basketball

NCAA tournament National Champions ACC tournament champions ACC regular season co-champions

National Championship Game, W 82–72 vs. Arizona
- Conference: Atlantic Coast Conference

Ranking
- Coaches: No. 1
- AP: No. 1
- Record: 35–4 (13–3 ACC)
- Head coach: Mike Krzyzewski (21st season)
- Assistant coaches: Johnny Dawkins; Chris Collins; Steve Wojciechowski
- Home arena: Cameron Indoor Stadium

2000–01 ACC men's basketball standings
	Conf.				Overall
Team	W		L	PCT	W		L	PCT
No. 6 North Carolina	13	–	3	.813	26	–	7	.788
No. 1 Duke †	13	–	3	.813	35	–	4	.897
No. 11 Maryland	10	–	6	.625	25	–	11	.694
No. 16 Virginia	9	–	7	.563	20	–	9	.690
Georgia Tech	8	–	8	.500	17	–	13	.567
No. 23 Wake Forest	8	–	8	.500	19	–	11	.633
NC State	5	–	11	.313	13	–	16	.448
Florida State	4	–	12	.250	9	–	21	.300
Clemson	2	–	14	.125	12	–	19	.387
† 2001 ACC tournament winner Rankings from AP Poll

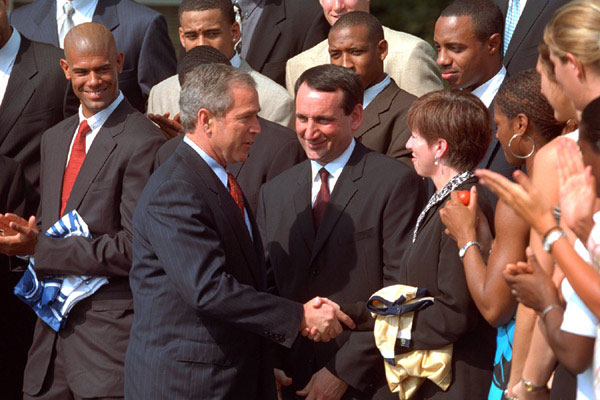
U.S. President George W. Bush shaking Coach Krzyzewski's hand following the championship win. Several Duke players stand behind them.

The 2000–01 Duke Blue Devils men's basketball team represented Duke University during the 2000–01 NCAA Division I men's basketball season, and were coached by 21st-year head coach Mike Krzyzewski.

Duke won the 2001 Atlantic Coast Conference tournament and defeated Monmouth, Missouri, UCLA, USC, Maryland, and Arizona to win their third national championship in Duke's history, under the leadership of All-American duo Shane Battier and Jason "Jay" Williams.

== Roster ==
2000–01 Duke Blue Devils men's basketball team
Players
Coaches

Pos.	#	Name	Height	Weight	Year	Previous school	Hometown
F	31	Shane Battier	6 ft 8 in (2.03 m)	220 lb (100 kg)	Sr	Country Day	Birmingham, MI
C	4	Carlos Boozer	6 ft 9 in (2.06 m)	280 lb (127 kg)	So	Juneau–Douglas	Juneau, AK
G	40	Andy Borman	6 ft 1 in (1.85 m)	180 lb (82 kg)	So	Bradenton (FL)	Morrisville, NC
G	15	Andre Buckner	5 ft 10 in (1.78 m)	170 lb (77 kg)	So	University Heights	Hopkinsville, KY
G	5	Ryan Caldbeck	6 ft 3 in (1.91 m)	190 lb (86 kg)	Sr	Rice Memorial	Shelburne, VT
F	41	Matt Christensen	6 ft 10 in (2.08 m)	265 lb (120 kg)	Jr	Belmont	Belmont, MA
G	21	Chris Duhon	6 ft 1 in (1.85 m)	190 lb (86 kg)	Fr	Salmen	Slidell, LA
G/F	34	Mike Dunleavy	6 ft 9 in (2.06 m)	220 lb (100 kg)	So	Jesuit	Lake Oswego, OR
F	3	Nick Horvath	6 ft 10 in (2.08 m)	250 lb (113 kg)	So	Mounds View	Shoreview, MN
G/F	14	Nate James	6 ft 6 in (1.98 m)	205 lb (93 kg)	Sr	St. John	Washington, DC
G/F	30	Dahntay Jones (redshirt)	6 ft 6 in (1.98 m)	210 lb (95 kg)	Jr	Steinart	Trenton, NJ
F	42	Reggie Love	6 ft 4 in (1.93 m)	225 lb (102 kg)	Fr	Providence Day	Charlotte, NC
C	20	Casey Sanders	6 ft 11 in (2.11 m)	235 lb (107 kg)	So	Tampa Prep	Tampa, FL
G	13	J.D. Simpson	6 ft 4 in (1.93 m)	200 lb (91 kg)	Sr	St. Francis	Woodside, CA
G/F	12	Andre Sweet	6 ft 6 in (1.98 m)	205 lb (93 kg)	Fr	Brother Rice	New York, NY
G	22	Jay Williams	6 ft 2 in (1.88 m)	195 lb (88 kg)	So	St. Joseph's	Plainfield, NJ

Head coach

- Mike Krzyzewski

Assistant coach(es)

- Chris Collins
- Johnny Dawkins
- Steve Wojciechowski

Legend

- (C) Team captain
- (S) Suspended
- (I) Ineligible
- (W) Walk-on
- Injured
- Current redshirt

Roster
Last update: 2017-05-13

== Expectations ==
Shane Battier entered his senior season as the remaining member of Duke's heralded recruiting class of 1997, which included Elton Brand and William Avery, and had nearly led Duke to a championship two years earlier. (Brand and Avery, along with Corey Maggette, were the first Duke underclassmen to leave early for the draft that year.) Despite losing the reigning ACC Player of the Year Chris Carrawell to graduation, the Blue Devils retained sophomores Jason "Jay" Williams, Mike Dunleavy Jr., and Carlos Boozer, and added freshman Chris Duhon to their lineup.

== Regular season ==
On January 27, 2001, the #2 Duke Blue Devils played at #8 Maryland Terrapins in the first of four contests between these two ACC powerhouses. With Duke trailing by 10 points, with 54 seconds left in regulation, Williams scored eight points. These points included two 3-pointers in a 13-second span. James hit two free throws to send this game into overtime. In overtime, Battier blocked a layup by Juan Dixon at the baseline with 4 seconds left to preserve a 98 to 96 victory.

However, the Blue Devils stumbled in the next game at home against their rival, 4th ranked North Carolina, by a score of 85 to 83. A month later, Maryland would avenge their home loss to Duke when the No. 16 Terrapins defeated the No. 2 Blue Devils 91 to 80 on Shane Battier's Senior Night in Cameron Indoor Stadium. After center Carlos Boozer had to leave with a foot injury in that game, Coach Krzyzewski changed his strategy, favoring a smaller, quicker lineup by having Duhon start at point guard and moving Williams over to shooting guard. His plan was successful in Duke's next game at North Carolina, when Duke defeated the No. 4 Tar Heels 95 to 81 to claim a share of the regular season championship. The Blue Devils went on to win 6 of its games following Boozer's injury. Then Boozer rejoined the team in the Sweet Sixteen of the NCAA Tournament.

== Conference tournament ==
Duke finished the regular season with a 26–4 record entering the ACC tournament as a No. 2 seed. In the tournament semifinals, they met Maryland for the third time this season. In another thrilling contest, after Maryland had rallied from a 14-point, second-half deficit, the Blue Devils defeated the Terrapins 84 to 82 when Nate James tipped in the game-winner with 1.3 seconds left to advance to the title game against North Carolina. In the third game between Duke and UNC that season, the Blue Devils emerged victorious as ACC tournament champions by the score of 79 to 53 and received a No. 1 seed in the East Regional of the NCAA tournament.

== NCAA tournament ==
The Blue Devils would travel the same path they took nine years ago when they claimed their last championship in 1992, from Greensboro to Philadelphia to Minneapolis, where they met Maryland for the fourth time that season, this time in the Final Four with a berth in the championship game at stake. Finding themselves down 39 to 17 with 6:57 to play in the first half and down 49 to 38 at Halftime, Duke went on to stage a comeback against the Terrapins and win 95–84 to advance to the championship game. Duke's 22-point deficit and 11-point Halftime deficit marked the largest comeback in Final Four history until 2022, when Kansas overcame a 15-point halftime deficit to defeat North Carolina in the National Championship Game.

Facing fifth-ranked Arizona led by Gilbert Arenas and Richard Jefferson and coached by Lute Olson, who had lost his wife to cancer earlier during the season, Duke was able to stave off a comeback attempt in the second half and clinch the title by a final score of 82–72. With his third national championship, coach Mike Krzyzewski tied his mentor Bob Knight for third place behind Adolph Rupp (4) and John Wooden (10). Battier was named the NCAA basketball tournament Most Outstanding Player.

== 2000–01 schedule and results ==
Date time, TV	Rank^{#}	Opponent^{#}	Result	Record	Site (attendance) city, state
Regular season
November 14, 2000*; 9:00 pm, ESPN	No. 2	Princeton	W 107-59	1–0	Cameron Indoor Stadium (9,314); Durham, North Carolina
November 17, 2000*; 7:00 pm, ESPN	No. 2	Villanova	W 98–85	2–0	Cameron Indoor Stadium (9,314); Durham, North Carolina
November 22, 2000*; 9:00 pm, ESPN	No. 2	vs. Texas; Preseason NIT	W 95–69	3–0	Madison Square Garden (11,449); New York City
November 24, 2000*; 9:00 pm, ESPN	No. 2	vs. Temple; Preseason NIT	W 63–61	4–0	Madison Square Garden (12,989); New York
November 25, 2000*; 9:00 pm, HTS	No. 2	Army	W 91–48	5–0	Cameron Indoor Stadium (9,314); Durham, North Carolina
November 28, 2000*; 9:00 pm, ESPN	No. 1	vs. No. 9 Illinois; ACC–Big Ten Challenge	W 78–77	6–0	Greensboro Coliseum (17,966); Greensboro, North Carolina
December 2, 2000*; 7:00 pm, ESPN	No. 1	at No. 17 Temple	W 93–68	7–0	First Union Center (19,455); Philadelphia
December 5, 2000*; 7:00 pm, FSS/HTS	No. 1	Davidson	W 102–60	8–0	Cameron Indoor Stadium (9,314); Durham, North Carolina
December 9, 2000*; 9:00 pm, ESPN	No. 1	Michigan; Rivalry	W 104–61	9–0	Cameron Indoor Stadium (9,314); Durham, North Carolina
December 19, 2000*; 10:00 pm	No. 1	at Portland	W 97–64	10–0	Rose Garden (15,341); Portland, Oregon
December 21, 2000*; 9:00 pm, FSN/HTS	No. 1	vs. No. 3 Stanford; Pete Newell Challenge	L 83–84	10–1	The Arena in Oakland (19,804); Oakland, California
December 30, 2000*; 1:30 pm, RJ	No. 3	North Carolina A&T	W 108–73	11–1	Cameron Indoor Stadium (9,314); Durham, North Carolina
January 4, 2001; 7:00 pm, ESPN2	No. 3	at Florida State	W 99–72	12–1 (1–0)	Tallahassee–Leon County Civic Center (4,337); Tallahassee, Florida
January 7, 2001; 1:30 pm, RJ	No. 3	Clemson	W 115–74	13–1 (2–0)	Cameron Indoor Stadium (9,314); Durham, North Carolina
January 10, 2001; 9:00 pm, ESPN	No. 2	at North Carolina State	W 84–78	14–1 (3–0)	Entertainment & Sports Arena (18,263); Raleigh, North Carolina
January 13, 2001; 3:30 pm, ABC	No. 2	No. 10 Virginia	W 103–61	15–1 (4–0)	Cameron Indoor Stadium (9,314); Durham, North Carolina
January 16, 2001*; 7:30 pm, ESPN2	No. 2	No. 25 Boston College	W 97–75	16–1	Cameron Indoor Stadium (9,314); Durham, North Carolina
January 20, 2001; 12:00 pm, ESPN	No. 2	at Georgia Tech	W 98–77	17–1 (5–0)	Alexander Memorial Coliseum (10,000); Atlanta
January 24, 2001; 9:00 pm, RJ	No. 2	No. 9 Wake Forest	W 85–62	18–1 (6–0)	Cameron Indoor Stadium (9,314); Durham, North Carolina
January 27, 2001; 8:00 pm, ESPN	No. 2	at No. 8 Maryland	W 98–96 ^{OT}	19–1 (7–0)	Cole Field House (14,500); College Park, Maryland
February 1, 2001; 9:00 pm, ESPN2	No. 2	No. 4 North Carolina	L 83–85	19–2 (7–1)	Cameron Indoor Stadium (9,314); Durham, North Carolina
February 4, 2001; 1:00 pm, RJ	No. 2	Florida State	W 100–58	20–2 (8–1)	Cameron Indoor Stadium (9,314); Durham, North Carolina
February 7, 2001; 9:00 pm, ESPN	No. 3	at Clemson	W 81–64	21–2 (9–1)	Littlejohn Coliseum (10,700); Clemson, South Carolina
February 11, 2001; 3:30 pm, ABC	No. 3	North Carolina State	W 101–75	22–2 (10–1)	Cameron Indoor Stadium (9,314); Durham, North Carolina
February 14, 2001; 7:00 pm, ESPN	No. 3	at No. 12 Virginia	L 89–91	22–3 (10–2)	University Hall (8,242); Charlottesville, Virginia
February 18, 2001*; 12:00 pm, CBS	No. 3	at St. John's	W 91–59	23–3	Madison Square Garden (19,580); New York
February 21, 2001; 7:00 pm, ESPN	No. 4	Georgia Tech	W 98–54	24–3 (11–2)	Cameron Indoor Stadium (9,314); Durham, North Carolina
February 24, 2001; 1:00 pm, CBS	No. 4	at No. 24 Wake Forest	W 82–80	25–3 (12–2)	Lawrence Joel Veterans Memorial Coliseum (14,400); Winston-Salem, North Carolina
February 27, 2001; 8:00 pm, RJ	No. 2	No. 16 Maryland	L 80–91	25–4 (12–3)	Cameron Indoor Stadium (9,314); Durham, North Carolina
March 4, 2001; 3:30 pm, ABC	No. 2	at No. 4 North Carolina	W 95–81	26–4 (13–3)	Dean Smith Center (21,750); Chapel Hill, North Carolina
ACC tournament
March 9, 2001; 7:00 pm, ESPN	(7) No. 3	vs. (7) North Carolina State; Quarterfinals	W 76–61	27–4	Georgia Dome (40,083); Atlanta
March 10, 2001; 4:15 pm, ESPN	(2) No. 3	vs. (3) No. 11 Maryland; Semifinals	W 84–82	28–4	Georgia Dome (40,083); Atlanta
March 11, 2001; 1:15 pm, ESPN	(2) No. 3	vs. (1) No. 6 North Carolina; Finals	W 79–53	29–4	Georgia Dome (40,083); Atlanta
NCAA tournament
March 15, 2001*; 7:45 pm, CBS	(1 E) No. 1	vs. (16 E) Monmouth; First Round	W 95–52	30–4	Greensboro Coliseum (18,932); Greensboro, North Carolina
March 17, 2001*; 1:15 pm, CBS	(1 E) No. 1	vs. (9 E) Missouri; Second Round	W 94–81	31–4	Greensboro Coliseum (18,500); Greensboro, North Carolina
March 22, 2001*; 7:30 pm, CBS	(1 E) No. 1	vs. (4 E) No. 15 UCLA; Sweet Sixteen	W 76–63	32–4	First Union Center (20,270); Philadelphia
March 24, 2001*; 7:00 pm, CBS	(1 E) No. 1	vs. (6 E) USC; Elite Eight	W 79–69	33–4	First Union Center (20,270); Philadelphia
March 31, 2001*; CBS	(1 E) No. 1	vs. (3 W) No. 11 Maryland; Final Four	W 95–84	34–4	Hubert H. Humphrey Metrodome (45,406); Minneapolis
April 2, 2001*; CBS	(1 E) No. 1	vs. (2 MW) No. 5 Arizona; National Championship	W 82–72	35–4	Hubert H. Humphrey Metrodome (45,994); Minneapolis
*Non-conference game. ^{#}Rankings from AP Poll. (#) Tournament seedings in parentheses.

== Rankings ==
Ranking movements Legend: ██ Increase in ranking ██ Decrease in ranking
	Week																			
Poll	Pre	1	2	3	4	5	6	7	8	9	10	11	12	13	14	15	16	17	18	Final
AP	2	2	2	1	1	1	1	3	3	2	2	2	2	3	3	4	2	3	1	Not released
Coaches	2	2^	1	1	1	1	1	3	3	2	2	2	2	3	3	3	2	2	1	1

*AP does not release post-NCAA Tournament rankings.
^Coaches did not release a week 2 poll.

== Accomplishments ==
- 3rd national championship in school history (1991, 1992, 2001)
- 2nd appearance in national championship game in three years (1999, 2001)
- 3rd straight No. 1-ranking in final regular season AP poll, and 1st No. 1-ranked team to win the national championship since UCLA in 1995.
- Duke set an NCAA record by winning its 133rd game over a four-year period. The Blue Devils (133–15) broke the record set by Kentucky from 1995–96 to 1998–99.
- Duke is the first team to be seeded No. 1 over four consecutive seasons since the NCAA began seeding teams in 1979.
- Duke swept all the major National Player of the Year Awards:
  - Jason Williams was named the NABC Player of the Year.
  - Shane Battier claimed the AP National Player of the Year, Oscar Robertson Trophy, Wooden Award, Naismith Award, and Adolph Rupp Trophy awards.
- Shane Battier won the NABC Defensive Player of the Year award for the third straight time.
- Shane Battier tied an NCAA record for victories (131) for a four-year period set by Kentucky's Wayne Turner.
- Jason Williams set a Duke single-season scoring record with 841 points, previously held by Dick Groat (831) in 1951.
- Shane Battier and Jason Williams were consensus All-American First Team selections.
- Shane Battier was an Academic All-American First Team selection for the second straight year.
- Three players received All-ACC honors:
  - Shane Battier, Jason Williams (1st Team)
  - Nate James (3rd Team)
- Two players from the 2001 squad (Battier and Jason Williams) had their jerseys retired by Duke.
- Duke set records with the most three-pointers made (407) and attempted (1,057) in a single season by a college basketball team.
