= Olinsky =

Olinsky is a Slavic surname. Notable people with the surname include:

- Ivan Olinsky (1878–1962), Russian-born American painter and art instructor
- Tosca Olinsky (1909–1984), American artist

== Fictional characters ==
- Alvin Olinsky, a character in Chicago P.D.
- Ben Olinsky and Darlene Conner-Olinsky, characters in The Conners
