= Dorothy Wiggins =

American social media influencer

- Born: Dorothy Katz Palmer; August 14, 1925 (age 101); New York City, U.S.
- Education: Hempstead High School; Queens College
- Occupations: Social media influencer, socialite, stylist
- Spouses: Dr. William Carl Gittinger (m. 1946; died 1959) Guy Arthur Wiggins (m. 1959; died 2020)

Dorothy Katz Wiggins (née Palmer; formerly Gittinger; born August 14, 1925) is an American centenarian, social media influencer, socialite and former stylist. She is noted for her presence as a centenarian on both Instagram and TikTok.

== Early life and education ==
Wiggins was born Dorothy Palmer on August 14, 1925, at New York Hospital in Lenox Hill, Manhattan. She is the only child to Ferdinand Palmer (né Katz; 1894–1952) and Linda Graves Palmer (née Gross; 1899–1956). Both her parents were of Jewish descent and had anglicized their last names prior respectively shortly after marriage.

She was primarily raised in Forest Hills, Queens and Lyme, Connecticut, where her parents owned a home on Beckett Hill. There her parents became acquainted with Guy C. Wiggins through his art. Wiggins graduated from Hempstead High School in Hempstead, New York and subsequently attended Queens College.

== Personal life ==
In 1946, she married Dr. William Carl Gittinger, son of William M. Gittinger and Caroline Gittinger (née Raab), of Ozone Park, Queens. He died in the crash of Capital Airlines Flight 75 on May 12, 1959, near Chase, Maryland, aged 32. They had a son:

- Grant P. Wiggins (né Gittinger; 1950–2015), a noted educator and author, married Denise Wilbur, had four children. He would later be adopted by Wiggins' second husband and take his family name.

On September 26, 1959, she married, secondly, to Guy Arthur Wiggins (1920–2020), a son of Guy C. Wiggins and Dolores Wiggins (née Gaxton). He was also a grandson of Carleton Wiggins, a noted Hudson River School painter. They were introduced since Dorothy's parents collected the paintings of his father and were acquaintances while living in Lyme, Connecticut. They had two sons;

- Guy Stuart Wiggins (born 1962), a lawyer and businessman, firstly married to Rose Alexandra Kernochan, divorced.
- Noel Carleton Wiggins (born 1964), an artist, creative director and founder of Areaware, a furniture, decor and design company, based in New York City.

As of August 2026, aged 101, Wiggins independently resides in a brownstone in the West Village.
