= Kate Newhall =

American landscape artist (1840–1917)

Kate W. Newhall
- Born: Catherine White Newhall; 1840; Fall River, MA
- Died: 1917 (aged 76–77); Berkeley, CA
- Education: Cooper Union, New York 1863-1864

Kate W. Newhall (1840-1917) was an American artist known for her oil landscape paintings, specializing in mountains, rivers, and coastal scenes. Her landscapes utilized muted pastels, light brush strokes, and often depicted sunsets over waterscapes.

== Early life and education ==
Born in Fall River, Massachusetts, Newhall spent her youth in Concord, New Hampshire, where she discovered her love of and talent for painting.

During her early twenties, Newhall was enrolled at Cooper Union in New York City between 1863-64 where she received a certificate in "Drawing and Painting from Still Life". In addition to studying at Cooper Union, Newhall took classes with three separate landscape and marine painters: Rufus Wright, Carleton Wiggins, and Mauritz F.H. de Haas. She remained close friends with her sketching partner William Keith and Leola Coggins.

== Career ==
Around 1870, Newhall had built a reputation with her skills as a landscape artist, whose works were drawn from the New England countryside. In 1875, she relocated to Plainfield, New Jersey where she would remain until 1897, when she then relocated with her brother to Berkeley, California. She was able to support herself with her artworks and was eventually able to open her own studio in California. During her time in California, she began to create depictions of marine scenes and sunsets, including scenes of Santa Barbara, Lake Tahoe, Monterey, and the San Francisco Bay. Newhall was able to support herself with her art for the remainder of her life.

Some of her works were featured in exhibition venues that included the Art Association of Berkeley, the San Francisco Art Association, National Academy of Design, and the Brooklyn Art Association.

== List of works ==
- In the Sierras, n.d.
- A River Landscape, 1886.
- Hunter in a Winter Landscape, n.d.
- Carmel Coast, 1905.
- Sunset Over San Francisco Bay, 1906.
