= 2001 NBA draft =

Basketball player selection

General information
- Sport: Basketball
- Date: June 27, 2001
- Location: The Theater at Madison Square Garden (New York City, New York)
- Network: TNT

Overview
- 57 total selections in 2 rounds
- League: NBA
- First selection: Kwame Brown (Washington Wizards)
- Hall of Famers: 2: PF Pau Gasol; PG Tony Parker

The 2001 NBA draft took place on June 27, 2001, in New York City, New York. Kwame Brown became the first high school player to be drafted with the first overall pick in the history of the NBA. The selection of Kwame Brown by the Washington Wizards, over players that have gone on to have more successful NBA careers, has been a source of great criticism by numerous media outlets. Several international players from this draft, Pau Gasol (Spain), Tony Parker (France) and Mehmet Okur (Turkey), became NBA All-Stars.

The Minnesota Timberwolves forfeited their first-round pick due to salary cap violations. It would be the first of two first rounders that would have to forfeit their picks during the early 2000s.

Eight of the players selected in this draft would never play in an NBA game in their professional basketball careers. Both of the players drafted by the New York Knicks (Michael Wright and Eric Chenowith) were among this group.

The final remaining active player from this draft was Joe Johnson, who retired from the NBA following the 2022 season. Thus, no active players remain from this class.

== Draft selections ==
G	Guard	PG	Point guard	SG	Shooting guard	F	Forward	SF	Small forward	PF	Power forward	C	Center

^	Denotes player who has been inducted to the Naismith Memorial Basketball Hall of Fame
*	Denotes player who has been selected for at least one All-Star Game and All-NBA Team
^{+}	Denotes player who has been selected for at least one All-Star Game
^{#}	Denotes player who has never appeared in an NBA regular-season or playoff game
^{~}	Denotes player who has been selected as Rookie of the Year

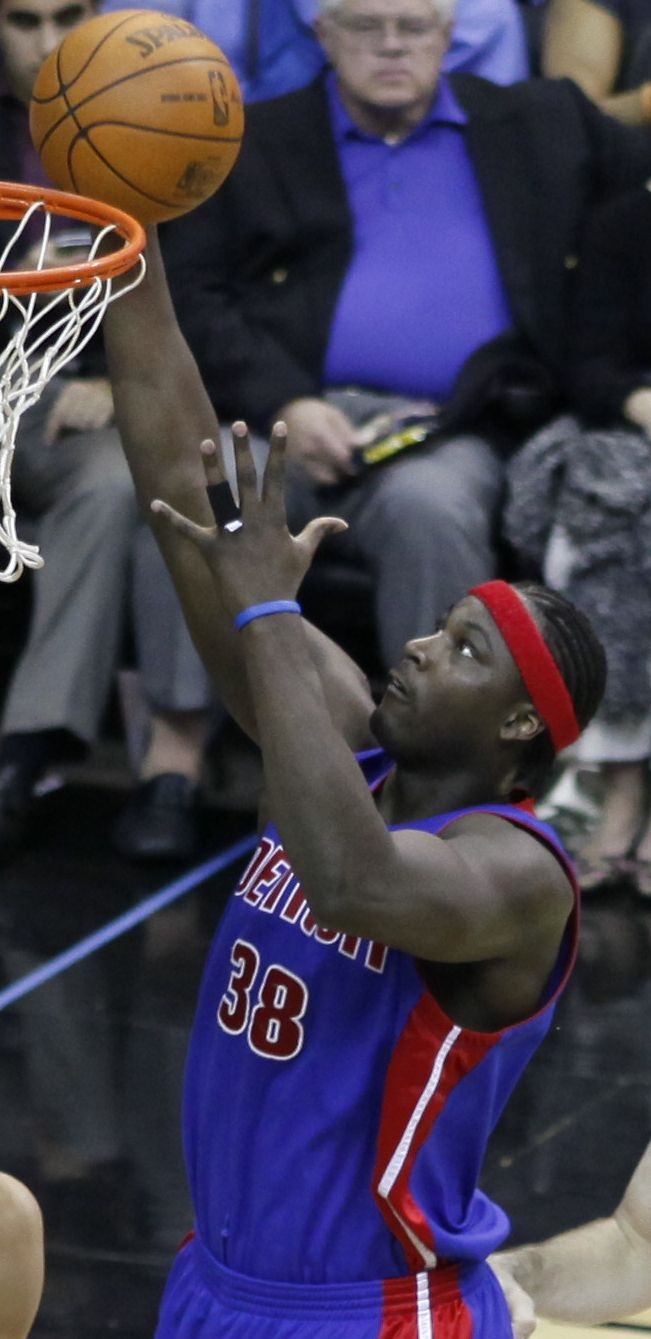
Kwame Brown was selected 1st overall by the Washington Wizards.

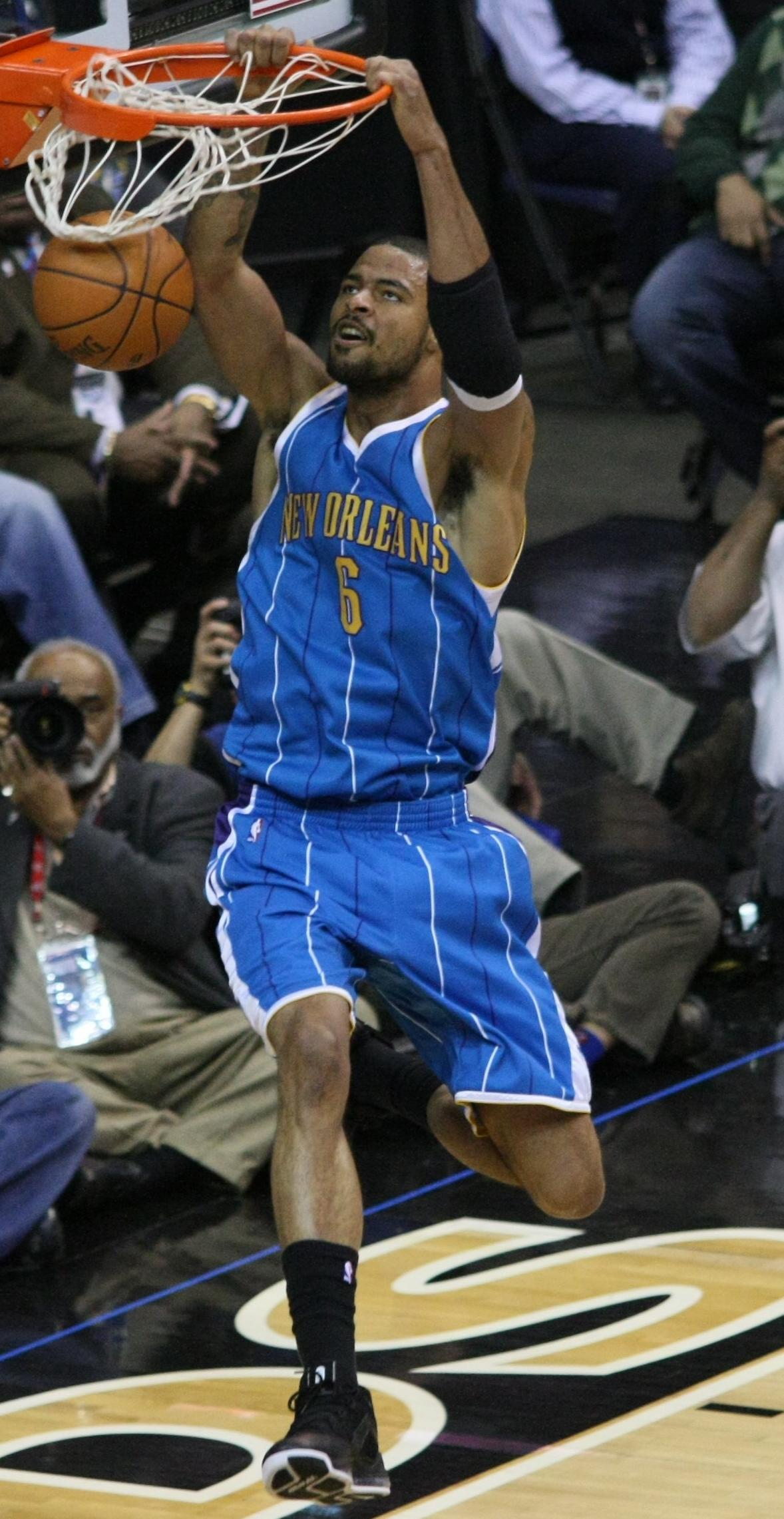
Tyson Chandler was selected 2nd overall by the Los Angeles Clippers (traded to the Chicago Bulls).

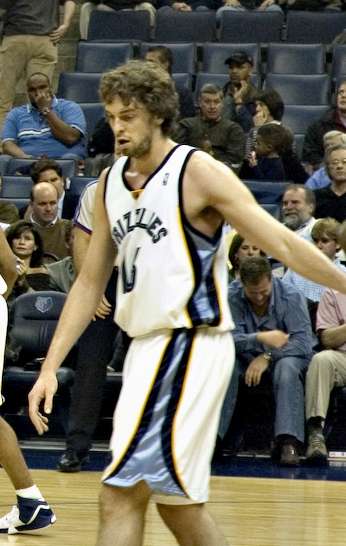
Pau Gasol was selected 3rd overall by the Atlanta Hawks (traded to the Vancouver Grizzlies).

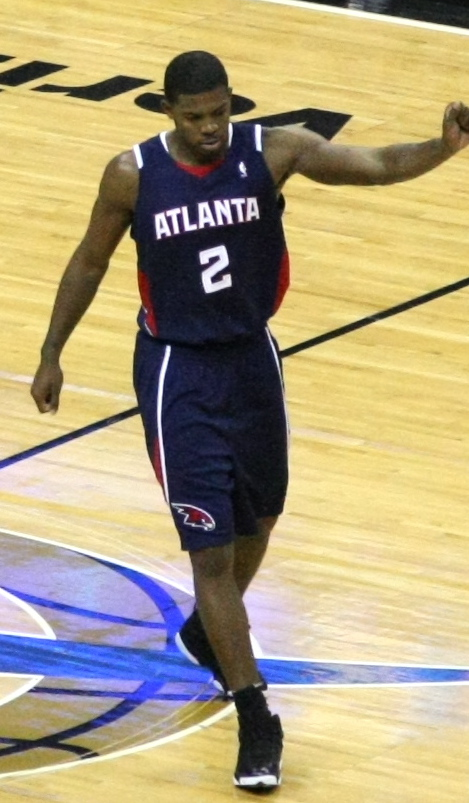
Joe Johnson was selected 10th overall by the Boston Celtics.

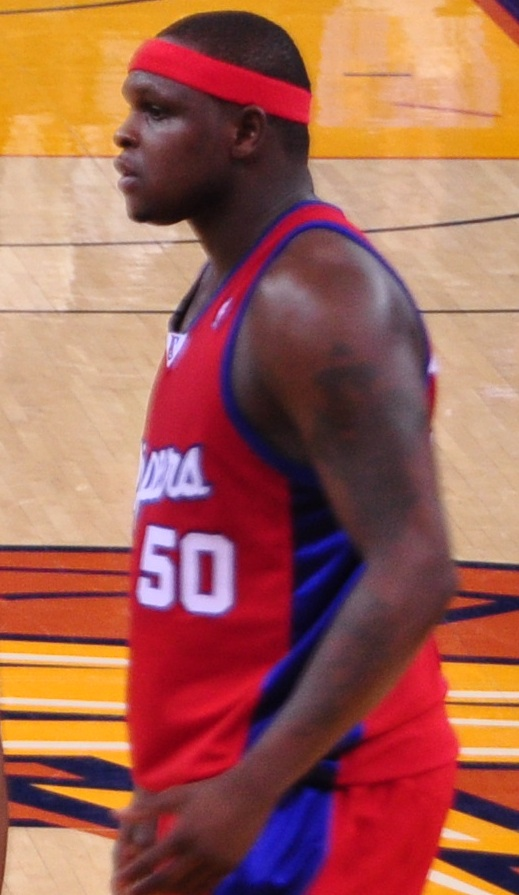
Zach Randolph was selected 19th overall by the Portland Trail Blazers.

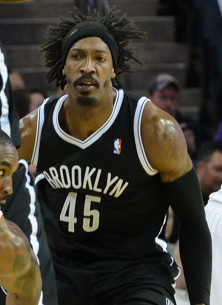
Gerald Wallace was selected 25th overall by the Sacramento Kings.

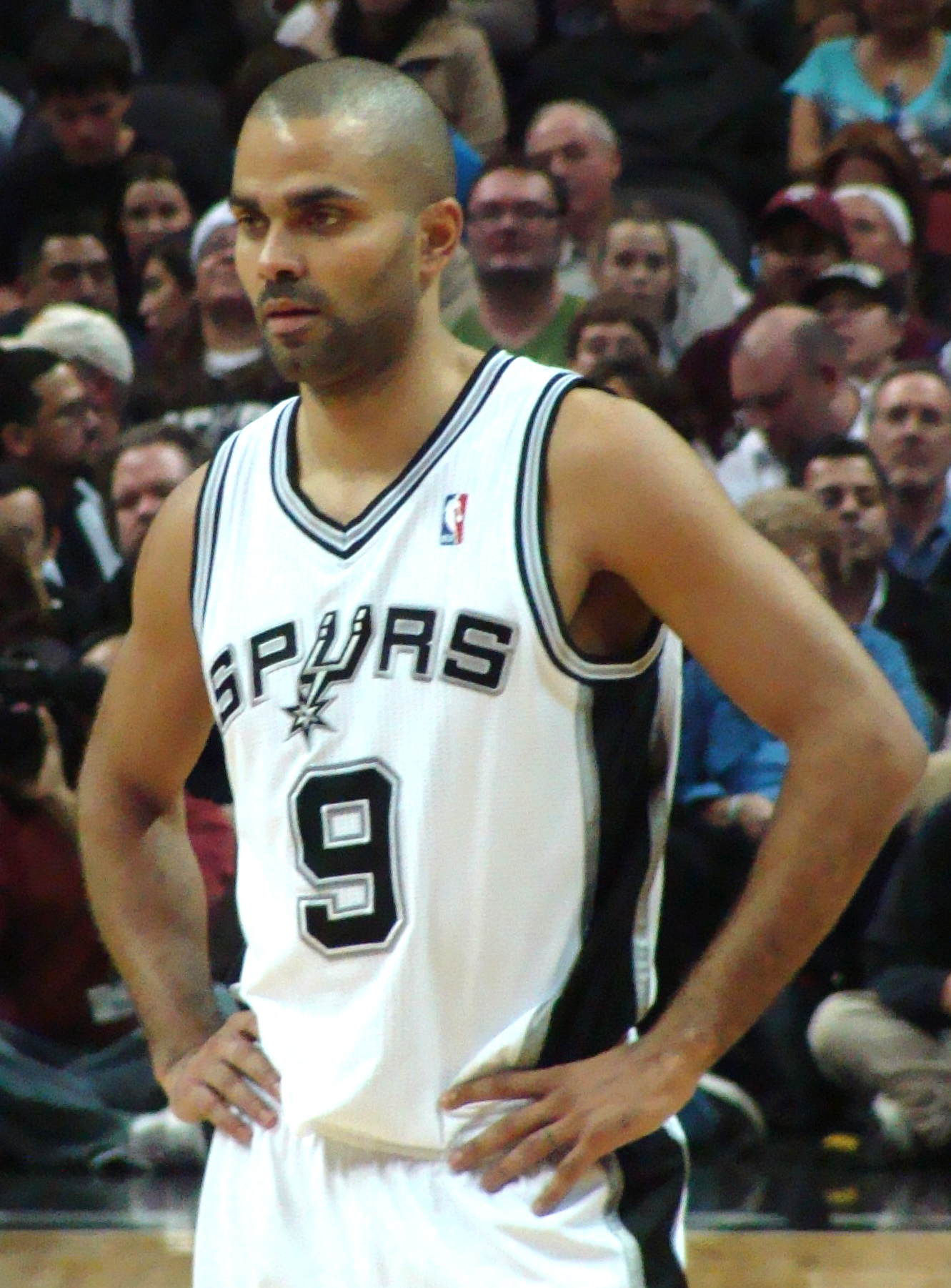
Tony Parker was selected 28th overall by the San Antonio Spurs.

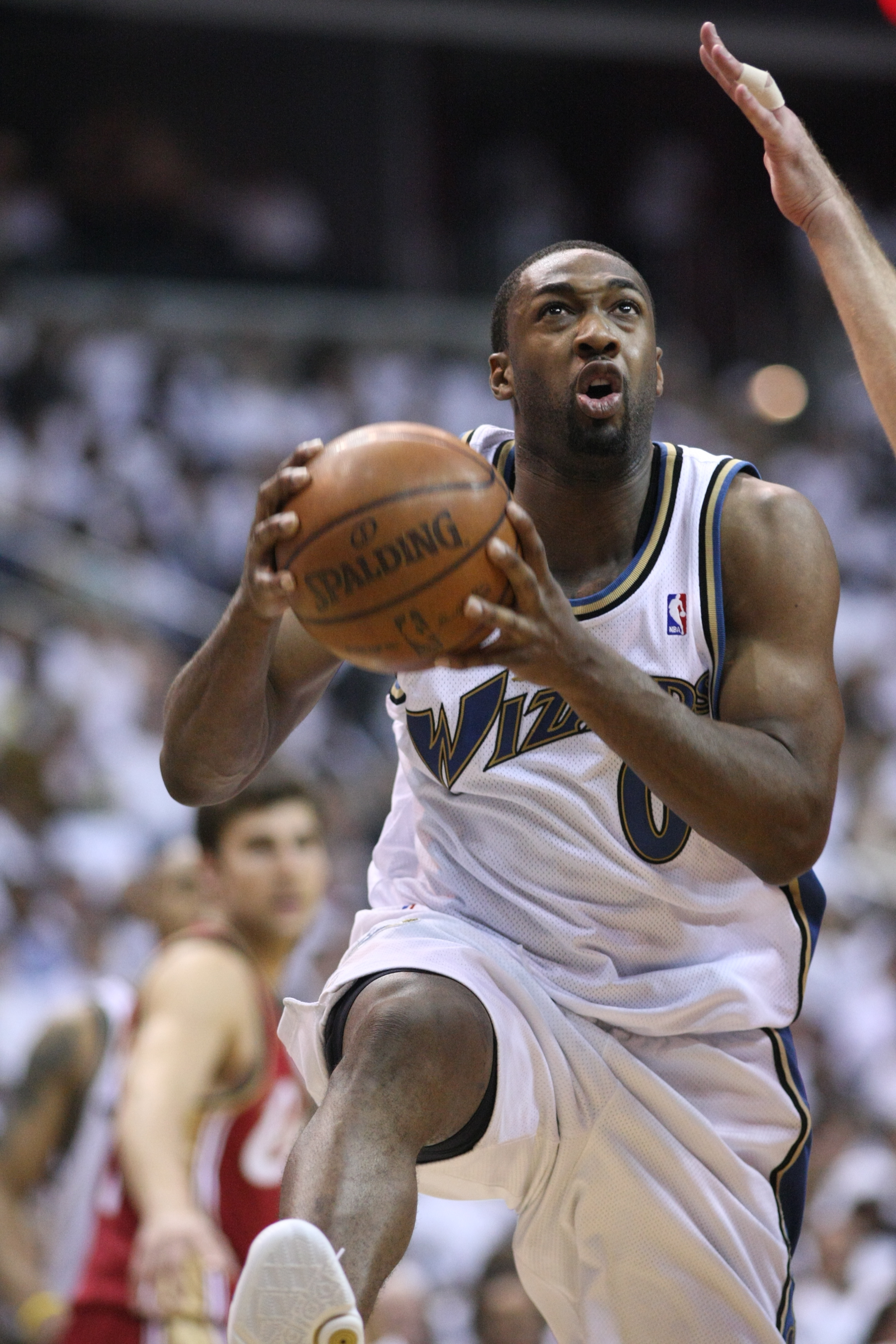
Gilbert Arenas was selected 31st overall by the Golden State Warriors.

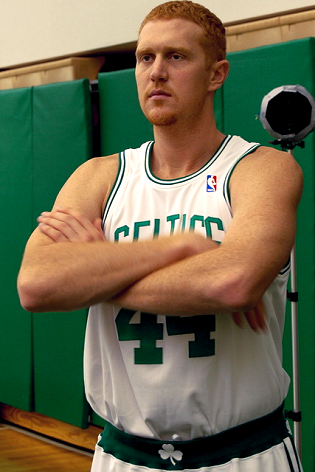
Brian Scalabrine was selected 35th overall by the New Jersey Nets.

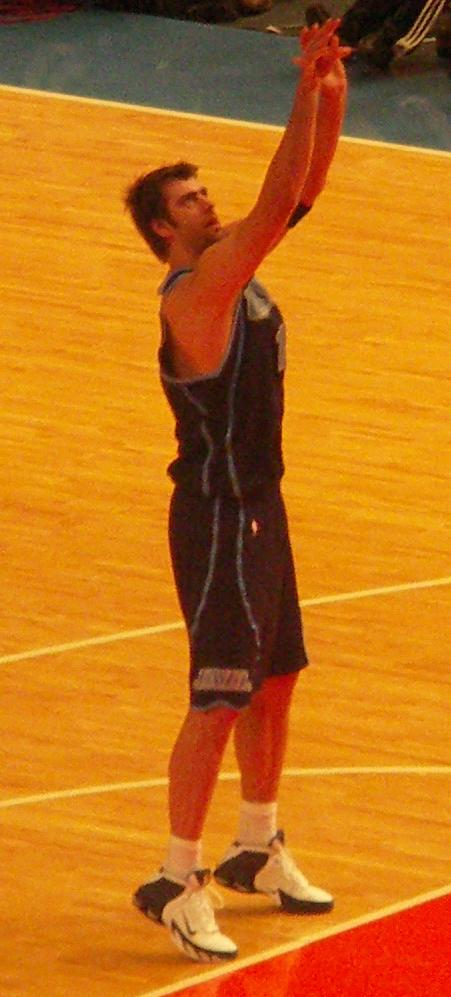
Mehmet Okur was selected 38th overall by the Detroit Pistons.

Round	Pick	Player	Position	Nationality (Note: Nationality indicates the player's national team or representative nationality. If a player has not competed at the international level, then the nationality indicates the national team which the player is eligible to represent according to FIBA rules.)	Team	School/club team
1	1	Kwame Brown	PF	United States	Washington Wizards	Glynn Academy (Brunswick, Georgia)
1	2	Tyson Chandler^{*}	C	United States	Los Angeles Clippers (traded to Chicago)	Dominguez HS (Compton, California)
1	3	Pau Gasol^~	PF/C	Spain	Atlanta Hawks (traded to Vancouver)	FC Barcelona (Spain)
1	4	Eddy Curry	C	United States	Chicago Bulls	Thornwood HS (South Holland, Illinois)
1	5	Jason Richardson	SG	United States	Golden State Warriors	Michigan State (So.)
1	6	Shane Battier	SF	United States	Vancouver Grizzlies	Duke (Sr.)
1	7	Eddie Griffin	PF	United States	New Jersey Nets (traded to Houston)	Seton Hall (Fr.)
1	8	DeSagana Diop	C	Senegal	Cleveland Cavaliers	Oak Hill Academy (Mouth of Wilson, Virginia) HS
1	9	Rodney White	SF/PF	United States	Detroit Pistons	Charlotte (Fr.)
1	10	Joe Johnson^{*}	SG	United States	Boston Celtics	Arkansas (So.)
1	11	Kedrick Brown	SF	United States	Boston Celtics (from Denver)	Okaloosa-Walton CC (So.)
1	12	Vladimir Radmanović	PF	FR Yugoslavia	Seattle SuperSonics	FMP (Yugoslavia)
1	13	Richard Jefferson	SF	United States	Houston Rockets (traded to New Jersey)	Arizona (Jr.)
1	14	Troy Murphy	PF	United States	Golden State Warriors (from Indiana)	Notre Dame (Jr.)
1	15	Steven Hunter	C	United States	Orlando Magic	DePaul (Fr.)
1	16	Kirk Haston	PF	United States	Charlotte Hornets	Indiana (Jr.)
1	17	Michael Bradley	PF	United States	Toronto Raptors	Villanova (Jr.)
1	18	Jason Collins	C	United States	Houston Rockets (from New York via Phoenix and Orlando, traded to New Jersey)	Stanford (Sr.)
1	19	Zach Randolph^{*}	PF	United States	Portland Trail Blazers	Michigan State (Fr.)
1	20	Brendan Haywood	C	United States	Cleveland Cavaliers (from Miami, traded to Orlando)	North Carolina (Sr.)
1	21	Joseph Forte	SG	United States	Boston Celtics (from Phoenix via Denver and Utah)	North Carolina (So.)
1	22	Jeryl Sasser	SG	United States	Orlando Magic (from Milwaukee via Houston)	SMU (Sr.)
1	23	Brandon Armstrong	SG	United States	Houston Rockets (from Dallas via Orlando, traded to New Jersey)	Pepperdine (Jr.)
1	24	Raül López	PG	Spain	Utah Jazz	Real Madrid (Spain)
1	25	Gerald Wallace^{+}	SF	United States	Sacramento Kings	Alabama (Fr.)
1	26	Samuel Dalembert	C	Canada	Philadelphia 76ers	Seton Hall (So.)
1	27	Jamaal Tinsley	PG	United States	Vancouver Grizzlies (from L.A. Lakers via New York, traded to Indiana via Atlanta)	Iowa State (Sr.)
1	28	Tony Parker^	PG	France	San Antonio Spurs	Paris Basket Racing (France)
1	29	Forfeited pick			Minnesota Timberwolves (forfeited their first-round pick due to salary cap violations)	
2	30	Trenton Hassell	SG	United States	Chicago Bulls	Austin Peay (Sr.)
2	31	Gilbert Arenas^{*}	PG	United States	Golden State Warriors	Arizona (So.)
2	32	Omar Cook	PG	United States	Orlando Magic (from Washington, traded to Denver)	St. John's (Fr.)
2	33	Will Solomon	PG	United States	Vancouver Grizzlies	Clemson (Sr.)
2	34	Terence Morris	PF	United States	Atlanta Hawks	Maryland (Sr.)
2	35	Brian Scalabrine	SF	United States	New Jersey Nets	USC (Sr.)
2	36	Jeff Trepagnier	SG	United States	Cleveland Cavaliers	USC (Sr.)
2	37	Damone Brown	SF	United States	Philadelphia 76ers (from L.A. Clippers)	Syracuse (Sr.)
2	38	Mehmet Okur^{+}	C	Turkey	Detroit Pistons	Efes Pilsen (Turkey)
2	39	Michael Wright^{#}	PF	United States	New York Knicks (from Boston via Seattle)	Arizona (Jr.)
2	40	Earl Watson	PG	United States	Seattle SuperSonics	UCLA (Sr.)
2	41	Jamison Brewer	PG	United States	Indiana Pacers	Auburn (So.)
2	42	Bobby Simmons	F/G	United States	Seattle SuperSonics	DePaul (Jr.)
2	43	Eric Chenowith^{#}	C	United States	New York Knicks (from Seattle)	Kansas (Sr.)
2	44	Kyle Hill^{#}	PG	United States	Dallas Mavericks (from Houston)	Eastern Illinois (Sr.)
2	45	Sean Lampley	SF	United States	Chicago Bulls (from Charlotte)	California (Sr.)
2	46	Loren Woods	C	United States	Minnesota Timberwolves	Arizona (Sr.)
2	47	Ousmane Cisse^{#}	PF	Mali	Denver Nuggets (from Toronto)	St. Jude HS (Montgomery, Alabama)
2	48	Antonis Fotsis	SF	Greece	Vancouver Grizzlies (from New York)	Panathinaikos (Greece) 1981
2	49	Ken Johnson	C	United States	Miami Heat	Ohio State (Sr.)
2	50	Ruben Boumtje-Boumtje	C	Cameroon	Portland Trail Blazers	Georgetown (Sr.)
2	51	Alton Ford	PF	United States	Phoenix Suns	Houston (Fr.)
2	52	Andre Hutson^{#}	PF	United States	Milwaukee Bucks	Michigan State (Sr.)
2	53	Jarron Collins	F/C	United States	Utah Jazz	Stanford (Sr.)
2	54	Kenny Satterfield	PG	United States	Dallas Mavericks	Cincinnati (So.)
2	55	Maurice Jeffers^{#}	SG	United States	Sacramento Kings	Saint Louis (Sr.)
2	56	Robertas Javtokas^{#}	C	Lithuania	San Antonio Spurs (from L.A. Lakers)	Lietuvos rytas Vilnius (Lithuania)
2	57	Alvin Jones	C	Luxembourg	Philadelphia 76ers	Georgia Tech (Sr.)
2	58	Bryan Bracey^{#}	SF	United States	San Antonio Spurs	Oregon (Sr.)

== Notable undrafted players ==
These players were not selected in the draft but have played at least one game in the NBA.

Player	Position	Nationality	School/club team
Carlos Arroyo	PG	Puerto Rico	FIU (Sr.)
Charlie Bell	G	United States	Michigan State (Sr.)
Tierre Brown	G	United States	McNeese State (Sr.)
Joe Crispin	PG	United States	Penn State (Sr.)
Maurice Evans	SG/SF	United States	Texas (Jr.)
Tang Hamilton	SF	United States	Mississippi State (Sr.)
Walter Herrmann	SF	Argentina	Atenas de Córdoba (Argentina)
Horace Jenkins	PG	United States	William Paterson (Sr.)
Jamario Moon	SF	United States	Meridian CC (Fr.)
Andrés Nocioni	PF/SF	Argentina	TAU Cerámica (Spain)
Dean Oliver	PG	United States	Iowa (Sr.)
Norman Richardson	G	United States	Hofstra (Sr.)
Paul Shirley	PF	United States	Iowa State (Sr.)
Cezary Trybański	C	Poland	Znicz Pruszków (Poland)
Ratko Varda	C	FR Yugoslavia	Partizan (Serbia)
Mike Wilks	PG	United States	Rice (Sr.)

== Early entrants ==
=== College underclassmen ===
This year would officially mark the very first year where the number of underclassmen that declared their entry into the NBA draft would exceed the number of selections made with 75 players that fit the underclassmen criteria declaring their initial entry for the NBA draft. However, it would also mark the largest number of dropped players yet with 23 of those players either coming from college or overseas deciding to withdraw from the draft for one reason or another. The following college basketball players successfully applied for early draft entrance.

- (United States) Gilbert Arenas – G, Arizona (sophomore)
- (United States) Brandon Armstrong – G, Pepperdine (junior)
- (United States) Malcolm Battles – F, Point Mark (junior)
- (United States) Tavorris Bell – F, Rhode Island (junior)
- (United States) Preston Bennett – F, Grayson (freshman)
- (United States) Michael Bradley – F, Villanova (junior)
- (United States) Jamison Brewer – G, Auburn (sophomore)
- (United States) Kedrick Brown – F, Okaloosa-Walton CC (sophomore)
- (United States) SirValiant Brown – G, George Washington (sophomore)
- (United States) Nick Burwell – G, Orange Coast (sophomore)
- (United States) Jason Collins – C, Stanford (junior)
- (United States) Omar Cook – G, St. John's (freshman)
- (Haiti) Samuel Dalembert – C/F, Seton Hall (sophomore)
- (United States) Maurice Evans – G, Texas (junior)
- (Nigeria) Benjamin Eze – F, Southern Idaho (freshman)
- (United States) Alton Ford – F, Houston (freshman)
- (United States) Joseph Forte – G, North Carolina (sophomore)
- (United States) Jerry Green – G, UC Irvine (junior)
- (United States) Eddie Griffin – F, Seton Hall (freshman)
- (United States) Rob Griffin – F, Kentucky Wesleyan (junior)
- (United States) Trenton Hassell – G, Austin Peay (junior)
- (United States) Kirk Haston – F, Indiana (junior)
- (United States) Draper Housley – G, Lee College (sophomore)
- (United States) Steven Hunter – C/F, DePaul (sophomore)
- (United States) Richard Jefferson – F, Arizona (junior)
- (United States) Joe Johnson – F/G, Arkansas (sophomore)
- (United States) D. A. Layne – G, Georgia (junior)
- (United States) Zach Marbury – G, Rhode Island (sophomore)
- (United States) Jamario Moon – F, Meridian (freshman)
- (United States) Troy Murphy – F, Notre Dame (junior)
- (United States) Zach Randolph – F, Michigan State (freshman)
- (United States) Jason Richardson – G, Michigan State (sophomore)
- (United States) Kenny Satterfield – G, Cincinnati (sophomore)
- (United States) Bobby Simmons – F, DePaul (junior)
- (United States) Will Solomon – G, Clemson (junior)
- (United States) Clifton Terry – F, Kennedy–King (sophomore)
- (United States) Gerald Wallace – F/G, Alabama (freshman)
- (United States) Rodney White – F, Charlotte (freshman)
- (United States) Michael Wright – F, Arizona (junior)

=== High school players ===
This would be the seventh straight year in a row where at least one high school player would declare their entry into the NBA draft directly out of high school after previously only allowing it one time back in 1975. This year would also mark the year with the highest amount of players coming directly out of high school yet with six players deciding to make the jump into an opportunity at the NBA (though only five of them would get it). Not only that, but it marked the first time that a high schooler would be taken as the #1 pick of the NBA draft. The following high school players successfully applied for early draft entrance.

- (United States) Kwame Brown – F, Glynn Academy (Brunswick, Georgia)
- (United States) Tyson Chandler – F/C, Dominguez High School (Compton, California)
- (Mali) Ousmane Cisse – F, St. Jude Educational Institute (Montgomery, Alabama)
- (United States) Eddy Curry – C/F, Thornwood High School (South Holland, Illinois)
- (Senegal) DeSagana Diop – C, Oak Hill Academy (Mouth of Wilson, Virginia)
- (United States) Tony Key – C, Centennial High School (Compton, California)

=== International players ===
The following international players successfully applied for early draft entrance.

- Denis Ershov – C, Pulkovo Saint Petersburg (Russia)
- Antonis Fotsis – F, Panathinaikos (Greece)
- Pau Gasol – F, FC Barcelona (Spain)
- Raül López – G, Real Madrid (Spain)
- Tony Parker – G, Paris Basket Racing (France)
- (Bosnia and Herzegovina) Vladimir Radmanović – F, FMP (FR Yugoslavia)

=== Other eligible players ===
Player	Team	Note	Ref.
(Lithuania) Robertas Javtokas	Lietuvos Rytas (Lithuania)	Left Arizona in 2000; playing professionally since the 2000–01 season	

== Invited attendees ==
The 2001 NBA draft is considered to be the 23rd NBA draft to have utilized what is properly considered the "green room" experience for NBA prospects. The NBA's green room is a staging area where anticipated draftees often sit with their families and representatives, waiting for their names to be called on draft night. Often being positioned either in front of or to the side of the podium (in this case, being positioned somewhere within The Theater at Madison Square Garden), once a player heard his name, he would walk to the podium to shake hands and take promotional photos with the NBA commissioner. From there, the players often conducted interviews with various media outlets while backstage. From there, the players often conducted interviews with various media outlets while backstage. However, once the NBA draft started to air nationally on TV starting with the 1980 NBA draft, the green room evolved from players waiting to hear their name called and then shaking hands with these select players who were often called to the hotel to take promotional pictures with the NBA commissioner a day or two after the draft concluded to having players in real-time waiting to hear their names called up and then shaking hands with David Stern, the NBA's commissioner at the time.

The NBA compiled its list of green room invites through collective voting by the NBA's team presidents and general managers alike, which in this year's case belonged to only what they believed were the top 14 prospects at the time. Despite the lower amount of invites for this year's draft when compared to the previous couple of drafts, there would still be a notable amount of discrepancies involved, such as an invitation being given out to Brendan Haywood instead of the actual 13th pick of the draft, Richard Jefferson, alongside multiple All-Stars and All-NBA talents like Zach Randolph, Gerald Wallace, Hall of Famer Tony Parker, Gilbert Arenas, and Mehmet Okur. Not only that, but it would also showcase the most high school players that would be invited into the Green Room by this point in time with four players being invited and later selected into the Top 10, including three players in the Top 4 and both Kwame Brown and Tyson Chandler being considered the top two picks of the draft at the time. With that in mind, the following players were invited to attend this year's draft festivities live and in person.

- (United States) Shane Battier – SF, Duke
- (United States) Kedrick Brown – SF, Okaloosa-Walton Community College
- (United States) Kwame Brown – PF, Glynn Academy (Brunswick, Georgia)
- (United States) Tyson Chandler – C, Dominguez High School (Compton, California)
- (United States) Eddy Curry – SG, Thornwood High School (South Holland, Illinois)
- (Senegal) DeSagana Diop – C, Oak Hill Academy (Mouth of Wilson, Virginia)
- Pau Gasol – C, FC Barcelona Bàsquet (Spain)
- (United States) Eddie Griffin – PF, Seton Hall
- (United States) Brendan Haywood – C, North Carolina
- (United States) Joe Johnson – SG, Arkansas
- (United States) Troy Murphy – PF, Notre Dame
- (Federal Republic of Yugoslavia) / (Serbia) / (Bosnia and Herzegovina) Vladimir Radmanović – PF, KK FMP (Yugoslavia)
- (United States) Jason Richardson – SG, Michigan State
- (United States) Rodney White – SF/PF, Charlotte

== See also ==
- List of first overall NBA draft picks
