= Spider Harrison =

American national radio DJ-entertainer

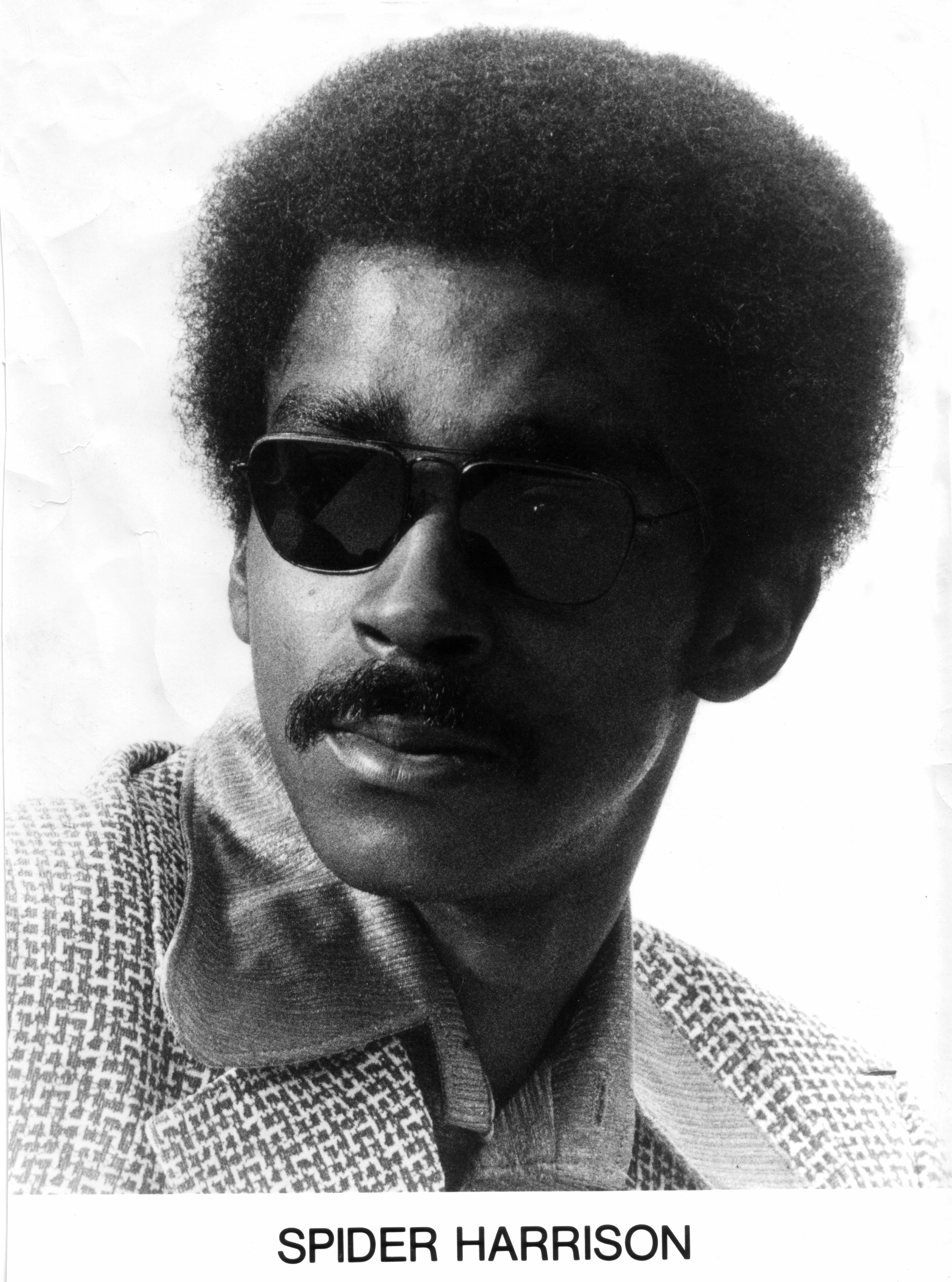
Spider Harrison

Spider Harrison is an American national radio DJ and entertainer who first rose to prominence after replacing John R. on WLAC/Randy's, a 50-thousand-watt Class A clear channel station in Nashville, Tennessee. He is the syndicated creator and host of urban-rock radio features "Spider Harrison's Rock n Soul America" and What Ever Happened To ..? and owner of independent record label Spido Records Ltd.

== Biography ==
=== Early life and education ===
Harrison was born in Hempstead, New York. As a running back on the Hempstead High School football team, he became known as "Spider Harrison" because of his size and speed. He carried the handle into his radio, recording and acting careers.

During his high school summers, he worked with a New York concert promoter, an arrangement that allowed him to meet with radio personalities from Top 40 powerhouse WABC and #1 Soul station WWRL as well as with many recording artists and record industry executives. Taking classes at C.W. Post College, Harrison worked several "fill in" air shifts on WCWP and created a show called An Introduction To Soul. He soon interned at WWRL in Woodside Queens where he honed his radio production skills and filled in on Sundays, setting up gospel "remotes" for churches throughout Brooklyn and Harlem (New York).

Spider Harrison attended C.W. Post College, Tennessee State University, and Los Angeles Valley College (AA Degree in Liberal Arts). He a Business Administration Degree from The University of La Verne (La Verne, CA). In April 2020, the Los Angeles Valley College monthly alumni newsletter acknowledged that Spider Harrison was a 1990 graduate. In 2020 Spider Harrison continued taking classes of interest at Chaffey College in Rancho Cucamonga, CA.

=== Career ===
Spider Harrison has appeared in national television commercials with Colonel Sanders for KFC, with Johnny Cash for STP Motor Oil, and with Billy Carter for Billy Beer. Amusingly, he was featured as a look-a-like of Los Angeles lawyer Johnnie Cochran during the 90's.

Harrison's independent music label SPIDO RECORDS released his remake of the Jim Stafford novelty song "Spiders and Snakes".

During the seventies while on WLAC, Spider Harrison guested vocally on albums by R&B artists Millie Jackson, "Feelin Bitchy" and the late Joe Tex, with little success. While program director and music director at WTLC-FM he met many artists including the R&B-jazz pianist Ramsey Lewis and Maurice White, who later formed Earth, Wind and Fire. In 1976 while Harrison was at WLAC, Ramsey Lewis recorded a hit dance single about Spider Harrison titled, "What's The Name Of This Funk Spider-Man" (Spider-Man a nickname for Harrison). The song was played often on Soul Train; Harrison and Soul Train creator Don Cornelius were friends. While Harrison was at WLAC-AM in Nashville, radio consultant Kent Burkhardt changed the Top 40 format promotional call letters to 15LAC. After Billboard Magazine bought 15LAC, Spider Harrison hosted the first Billboard Soul Countdown. At night the 50,000 watt 15LAC signal could be heard in some 20 states, parts of Canada and throughout the Caribbean. In 1981 Harrison headed for California.

In 2015, Spider Harrison was inducted into the Tennessee Radio Hall of Fame and WLAC, Nashville radio was honored with The Legendary Station Award. As of 2020 he is a member of the former Pacific Pioneer Broadcasters, now "Hollywood Media Professionals." Harrison became a board member in August 2019 for a three year term. Spider Harrison is an active member of the SAG-AFTRA Union. Spider Harrison is pursuing professional acting, television projects and capable of voice-tracking radio shows world-wide.

=== Singles ===
- Beautiful Day (1971)
- When "Spider" Counts Down, Your Ratings Go Up (1978)
- The Rhythm Machine (2006)
