= Tavorris Bell =

American basketball player (born 1978)

Personal information
- Full name: Tavorris E. Bell
- Nicknames: Night Train; T–Bell
- Nationality: (United States) American
- Born: June 26, 1978 (age 47) Hempstead, New York, United States
- Height: 6 ft 6 in (1.98 m)
- Weight: 210 lb (95 kg)

Sport
- Sport: Basketball
- Event: Streetball
- College team: Rhode Island (1998–2001)
- Team: AND1 Mixtape Tour (2000); Harlem Globetrotters (2002)

Tavorris Bell (born June 26, 1978), also known as "Night Train", is an American streetball player. He is best known for his appearance in season two of the AND1 Mixtape Tour, which used to air on ESPN. He is known for his dunking ability.

== High school ==
Bell attended Hempstead High School in his hometown of Hempstead, New York. As a junior, he averaged 23.7 points, 15.0 rebounds, 3.1 assists, 2.6 steals, and 2.5 blocked shots per game. His older brother, Norris, was a 1,000-point scorer at Hempstead and had set the school's all-time single-season dunk record of 76 until Tavorris broke it that year. Norris was also way better. Tavorris dunked 81 times in his junior season. An All-American his senior season, Bell chose to play at the University of Rhode Island despite leaning earlier towards St. John's University in New York.

== College ==
Bell played college basketball at Rhode Island, where he led the team in scoring for the 2000–01 season, but was dropped from the team in the 2001–02 season for academic reasons. While at Rhode Island, Bell was a teammate of future NBA champion Lamar Odom. Despite playing only three years, he managed to score 1,147 career points. After he was ruled academically ineligible during his junior season, Bell was declared an early entrant into the 2001 NBA draft, though he was ultimately never selected by any team.
