= Hempstead High School (New York) =

Coordinates: 40°41′48″N 73°37′54″W

Location
- 201 President Street; Hempstead, New York; United States

Information
- Type: Public
- Principal: Stephen Strachan
- Teaching staff: 70.10 FTEs
- Grades: 9–12
- Enrollment: 1,984 (as of 2023–2024)
- Student to teacher ratio: 28.30
- Colors: Blue and white
- Mascot: Tigers
- Yearbook: The New Tiger
- Affiliation: Conference A-1, Nassau County
- Website: Hempstead High School

Hempstead High School is a public high school located in Hempstead, New York, United States. It is the Hempstead Union Free School District's only high school.

As of the 2014–15 school year, the school had an enrollment of 2,226 students and 116.0 classroom teachers (on an FTE basis), for a student–teacher ratio of 19.2:1. There were 1,346 students (60.5% of enrollment) eligible for free lunch and 34 (1.5% of students) eligible for reduced-cost lunch.

== History ==
In the early 1920s, students from surrounding towns attended high school in Hempstead. It was not until the late 1950s that the last of these school districts built their own high schools.

In July 1970, Hempstead High School was burned down under presumably suspicious circumstances only 20 minutes after summer school classes were dismissed for the day. By 1972, a new Hempstead High School was built and students returned to normal location for classes. A middle school was built on the site of the old high school.

In 2014, Hempstead schools came to the attention of the New York State Education Department after a school document was leaked. This document revealed that 33 Hispanic students had been signing in for attendance each morning, only to be told to return home because there was not classroom space for them. The state later found that the number of excluded students may have been as high as 59, and threatened to remove school officials if they did not implement reforms. In a 2015 agreement with the New York Attorney General, the school agreed to implement new enrollment procedures and hire an independent monitor.

== Academics ==
Once a school of high academic, music and athletic standing from the early 1900s to the mid-1970s, the school experienced difficulties during a period of change in Hempstead and Nassau County between the 1980s and early 21st century. Regents examination scores in 2004 saw a relative improvement from 2003, though many classes such as Math A and English were still below the state average.

Extracurricular activities include a student government program. Hempstead's athletic teams compete in Class 1A of Section 8.

== Notable alumni ==
- A+ (Andre Levins; born 1981), rapper noted for his hit "All I See"; attended Hempstead High School and named his album released in 1999, Hempstead High
- Tavorris Bell (born 1978), Harlem Globetrotter
- Spider Harrison, DJ and entertainer
- Reuben L. Haskell, U.S. representative
- Tu Holloway (born 1989), basketball player for Maccabi Rishon LeZion in the Israeli Basketball Premier League
- John Mackey (graduated 1959), football player, Baltimore Colts and San Diego Chargers, Pro Football Hall of Famer
- Rob Moore (graduated 1986), football player, New York Jets, Arizona Cardinals, and Denver Broncos
- David Paterson (born 1954; graduated 1971 ), governor of New York (2008–10.
- Ray Platnick (1917–1986), press and war photographer
- The Product G&B, a singing duo best known for their collaborative hit with Carlos Santana, "Maria Maria"; both attended Hempstead High School
- Eric "Vietnam" Sadler (Hempstead High 1975–78), music producer
- Vivian Schuyler Key (1905–1990), artist, designer
- Raymond Gniewek ('49), concertmaster for the Metropolitan Opera Orchestra
- Dorothy Wiggins (born 1925; graduated 1943), socialite and social-media personality
