= Tosca Olinsky =

American painter

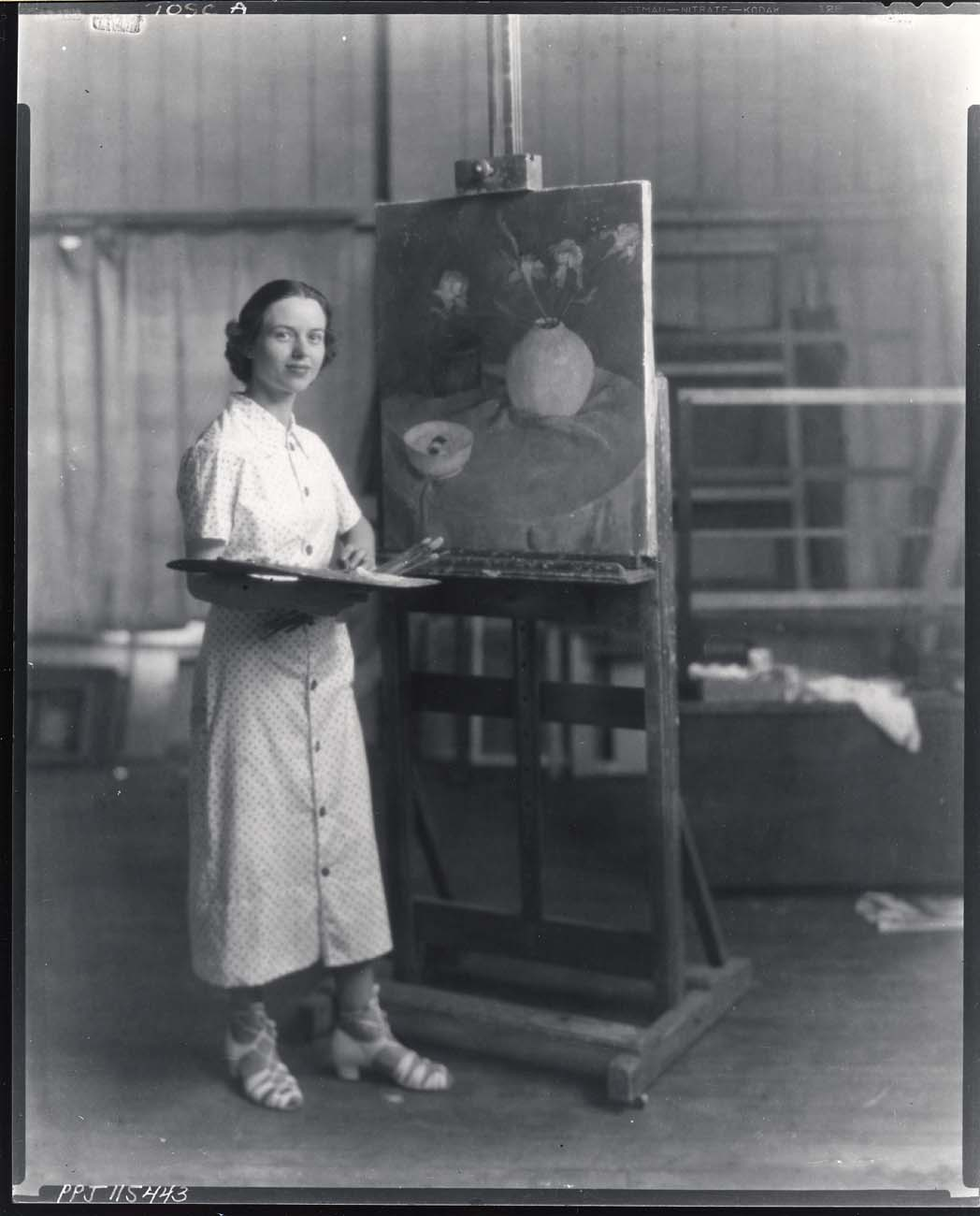
- Born: March 11, 1909; Florence, Italy
- Died: June 14, 1984 (aged 75); Old Lyme, Connecticut
- Known for: Artist
- Spouse: Charles Barteau

Tosca Olinsky (1909–1984) was an American artist known for her realist still life and figure paintings. Critics described her work as conservative and, as one said, falling between the extremes of a meticulous accuracy of illustration, on the one hand, and "the sketchy contrivance of an illusionistic picture", on the other. By temperament neither experimental nor innovative, she adopted a style in which another critic said, "professional competence and good taste" took precedence over "imagination and adventure". A third critic praised her skill in executing works within the narrow range of her choice of subjects and her manner of treating them. Other critics praised her handling of color and her ability to create harmonious designs.

She showed mostly in large exhibitions held by nonprofit organizations and, although she lived and worked mainly in Manhattan, she did not associate herself with any commercial galleries in that city. Her subjects were mainly still lifes, flower pieces, and female portraits. She also occasionally painted rural and urban scenes. She worked in oil, gouache, watercolor, pastel, and tempera. She normally worked in a studio and most of her output was approximately easel-sized.

Olinsky was born in Florence, Italy, on March 11, 1909, to parents who had emigrated from Eastern Europe to the United States in the first years of the century.

She received her art training at the National Academy of Design and the Art Students League, as well as from her father, the artist and art instructor Ivan Olinsky. She taught art in Old Lyme, Connecticut, for many years and was one of the organizers of the Lyme Academy of Fine Arts.

== Early life and training ==
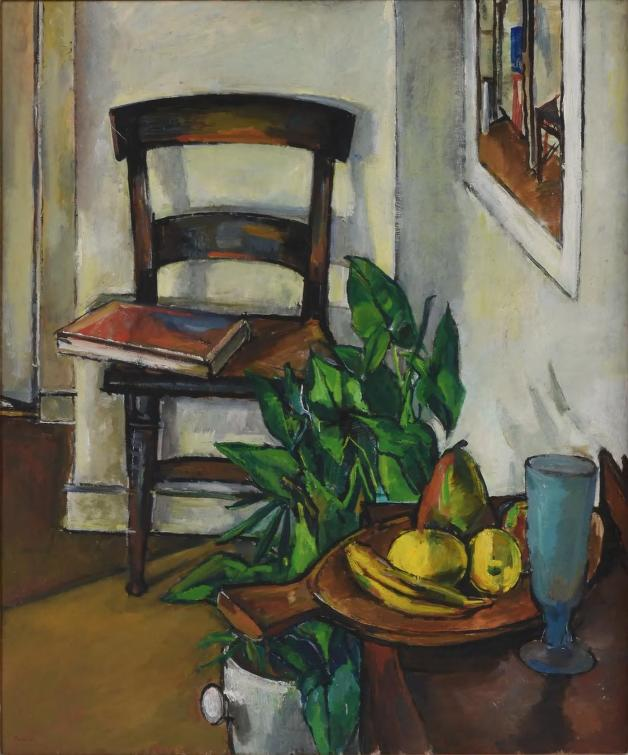
Tosca Olinsky, Still Life with chair, 1934, oil on panel, 30 x 25 inches

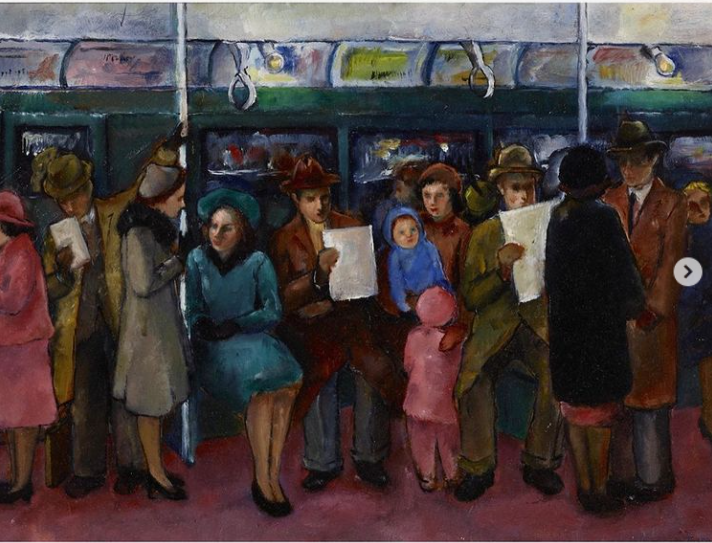
Tosca Olinsky, 8th Ave. local, about 1940, oil on board, 12 x 15 inches

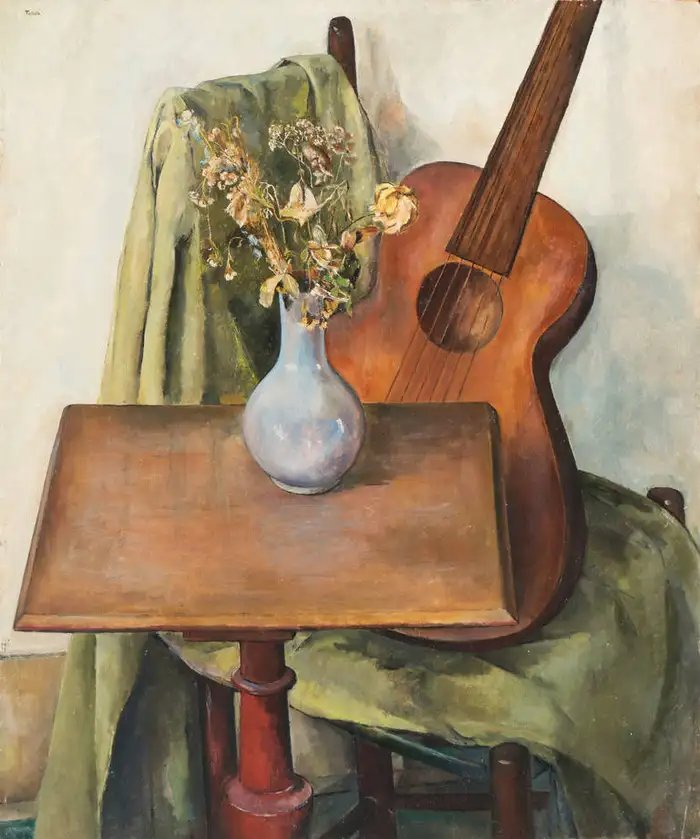
Tosca Olinsky, Still Life with Guitar, 1941, oil on board, 30 x 25 inches

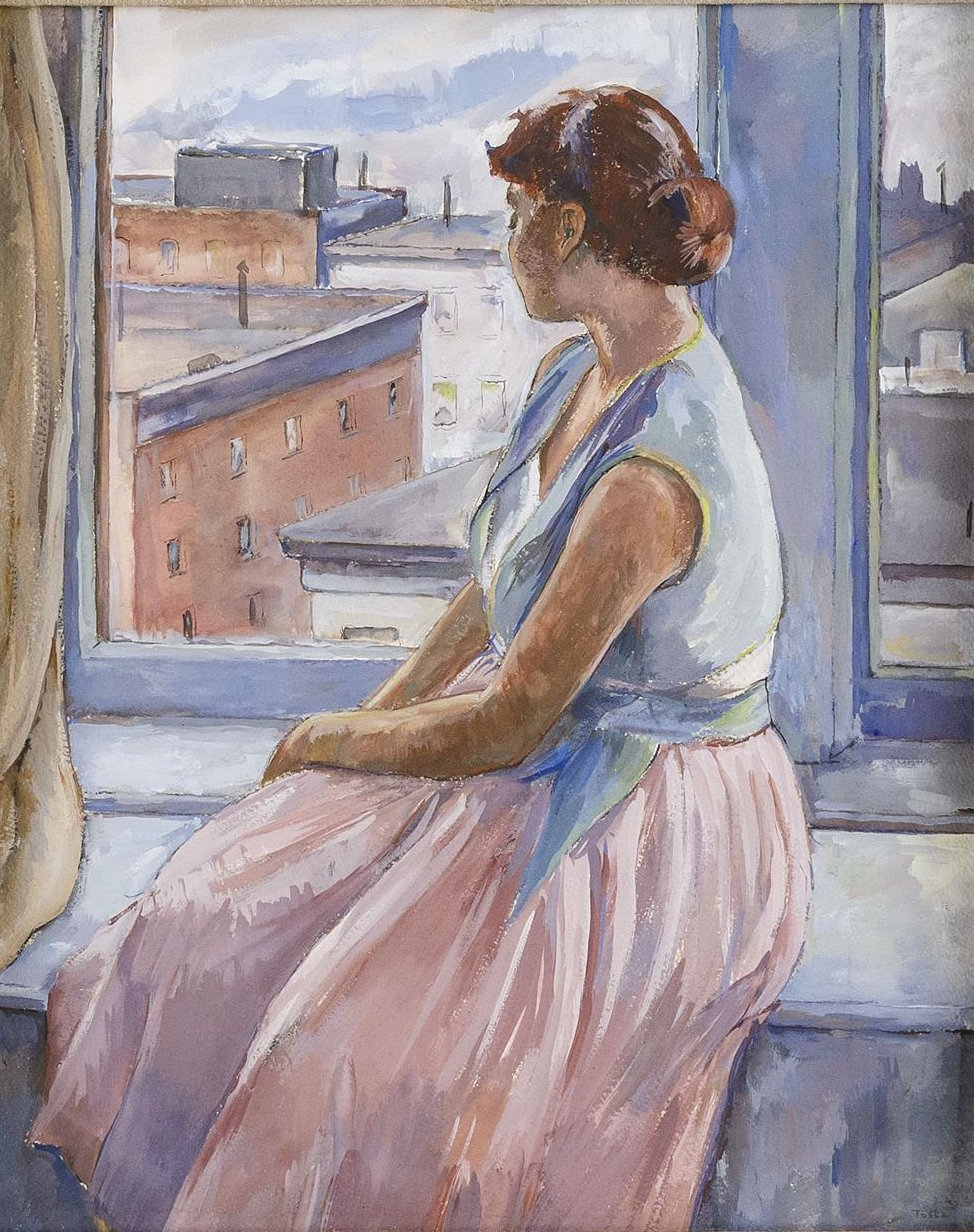
Tosca Olinsky, Girl at the Window, 1946, gouache on paper, 20 x 16 inches

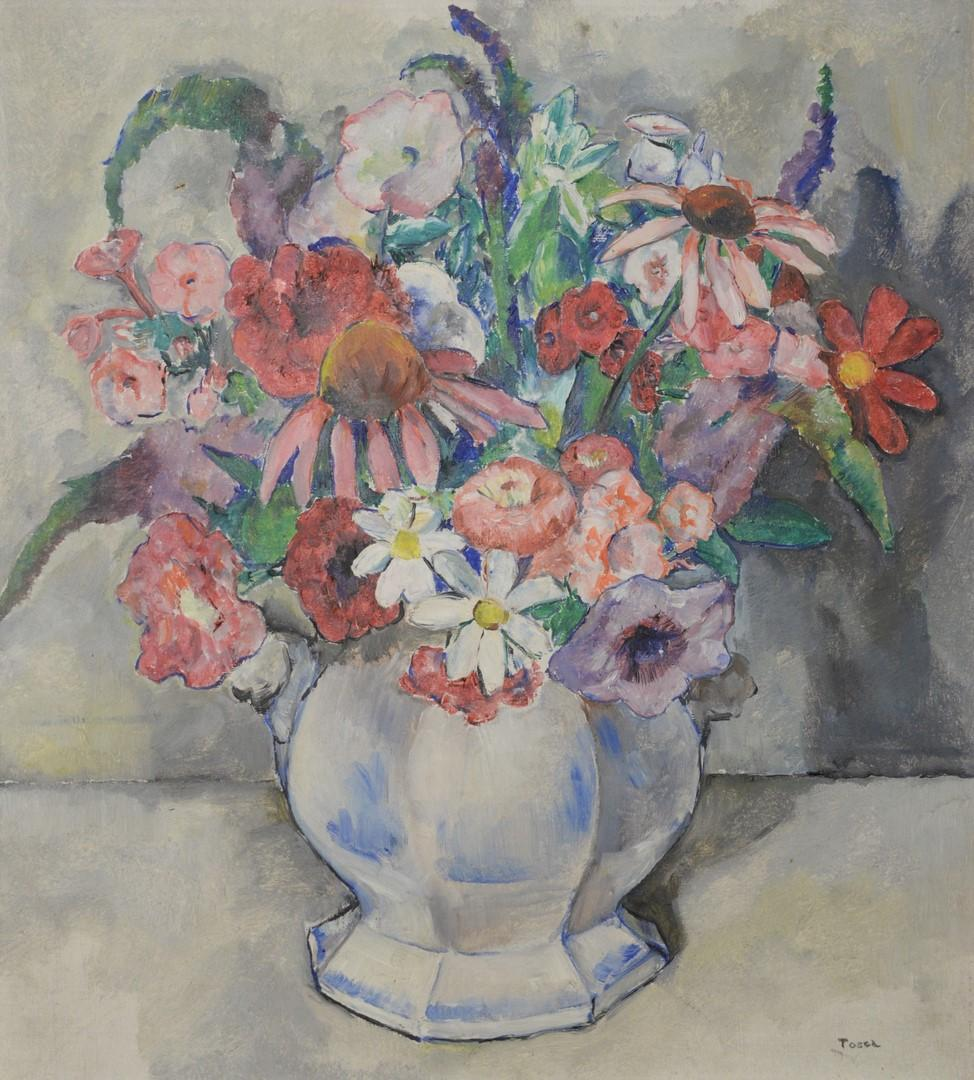
Tosca Olinsky, Floral Still Life, 1947 ca., oil on canvas, 15.5 x 14 inches

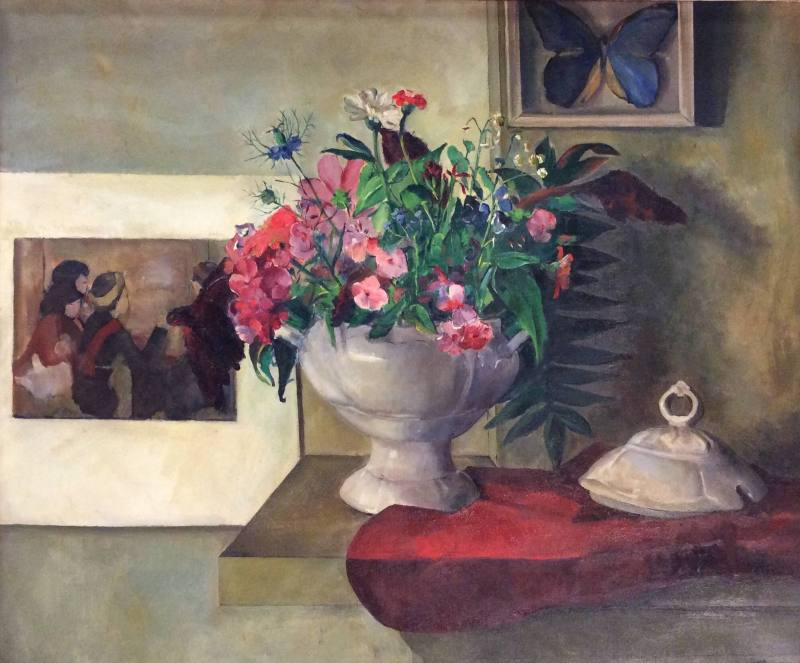
Tosca Olinsky, Floral Still Life, about 1969, oil on canvas, 25 x 30 inches

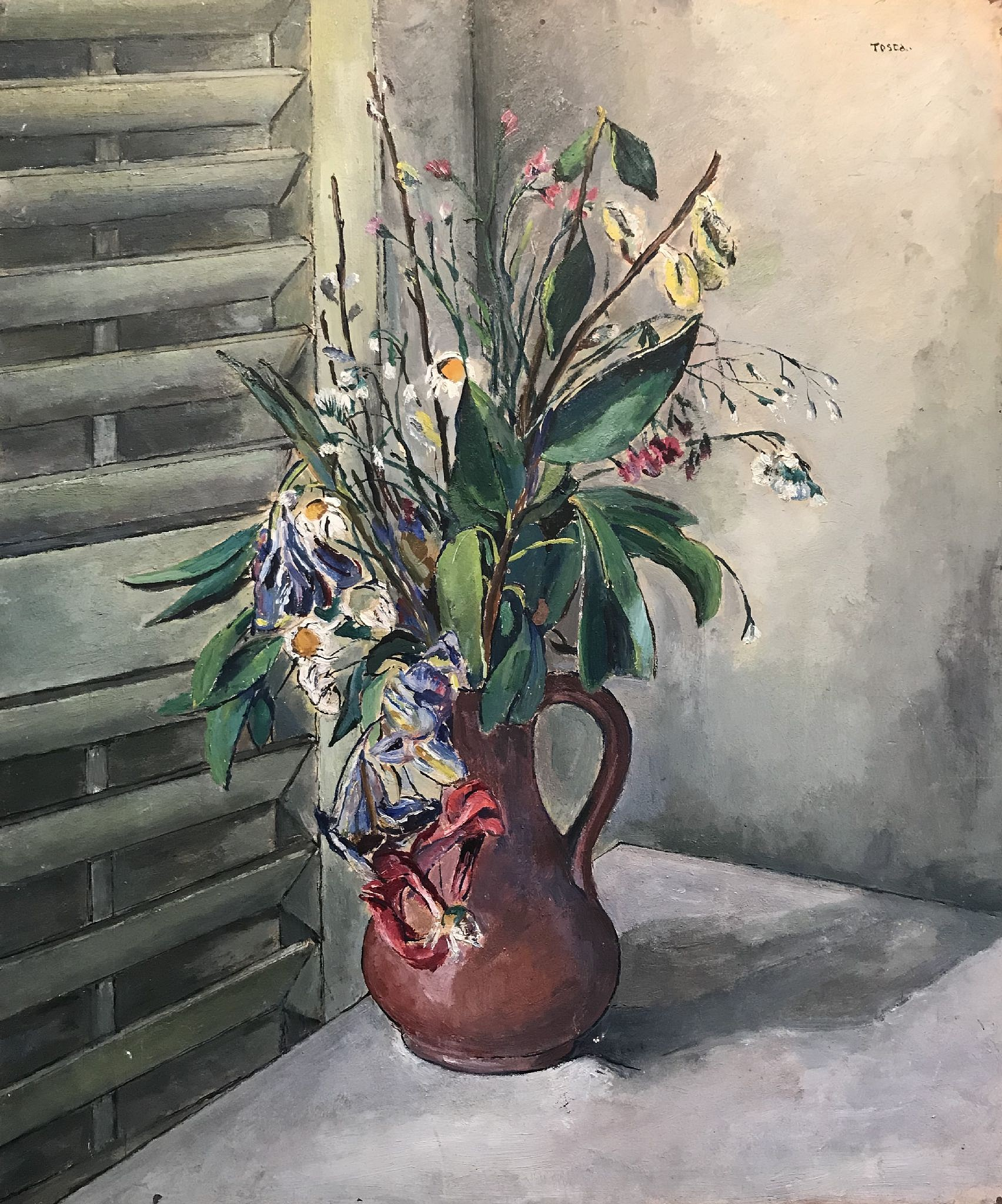
Tosca Olinsky, Flowers in a Vase, undated, oil on board, 24 x 20 inches

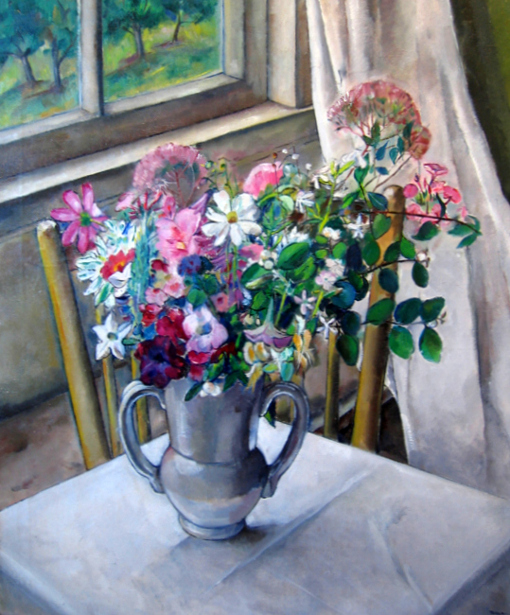
Tosca Olinsky, Flowers in a Silver Vase, undated, oil on canvas, 30 x 25 inches

Olinsky was born in Florence in 1909 during a period when her parents, both US citizens, were traveling in Italy. Living in Manhattan with her parents, she received training at home from her father, Ivan Olinsky, who was a noted portrait painter and art teacher. Between 1927 and 1930, attended the National Academy of Design where her instructors were Charles Louis Hinton, a prodigious realist painter and sculptor, and Raymond Neilson, a portraitist and still life painter. She subsequently took classes at the Art Students League where Neilson and her father were teaching.

== Career in art ==
Whether living with her parents or on her own, Olinsky generally spent the colder months in Manhattan and the warmer ones in the art colony of Old Lyme. In 1928, she made the first of many appearances in exhibitions of the Lyme Art Association,. and the following year, she made the first of many appearances in exhibitions of the National Academy of Design. Both associations were known for their conservative taste in art. Members of the New York academy tended simply, as one critic said, to avoid "innovation and experiment" while the members of the Lyme academy tended toward the realist style favored by Childe Hassam and other proponents of American Impressionism.

She also exhibited with the National Arts Club (founded in 1898), Allied Artists of America (founded in 1914), the Connecticut Watercolor Society (founded in 1938), Audubon Artists (founded in 1942), and the National Association of Women Artists (founded in 1889). Her paintings also appeared in group exhibitions at the Montclair Art Museum, Macbeth Galleries, the Macy Art Gallery, Grand Central Art Galleries, and the Essex Art Association.

She was given her first solo exhibition in 1944 at Grand Central Art Galleries. Most of the 18 works were flower paintings in tempera, some lent by collectors, and others newly made and offered for sale. Writing in The New York Times, the critic Howard Devree praised her "quiet yet spirited statements", while A.Z. Kruse, in the Brooklyn Daily Eagle, called attention to a "surety and briskness of touch", and Melville Upton, in the New York Sun, said it was a "brilliant showing". She had a second solo in 1949 at the Florence Griswold Museum in Old Lyme, a third at the Lyman Allyn Art Museum in New London in 1958, and others in 1971 and 1978 at the Lyme Art Center. Writing about the 1958 show, the painter Tom Ingle wrote: "Professional competence and good taste distinguish all of Tosca's works, taking precedence over imagination and adventure."

Olinsky received awards from the National Arts Club in 1934, 1936, 1937, 1939, and 1941; from the National Academy of Design in 1937 and 1943; and from Allied Artists of America in 1940. Other awards include Connecticut Watercolor Society in 1947, Audubon Artists in 1957 and 1959, the Instituto de Allende in Mexico in 1950, the Jane Peterson prize in 1957, and the Salmagundi Club prize for oil Allied Artists Show in 1972.

Images of Olinsky's paintings occasionally appeared in newspapers and journals from time to time. For example, in 1937, Art Digest showed the painting that won a prize at the National Academy that year; and in 1948 the Christian Science Monitor showed a floral still life with accompanying text discussing the enduring popularity of the genre. In 1941, The New York Times reproduced a painting called "Girl with a Straw Hat" and Times critic, Edward Alden Jewell called attention to the painting's "admirable freshness and strength".

After participating in the National Academy for many years as an associate member, Olinsky was elected to full membership in 1969. She also held memberships in the Lyme Art Association, Audubon Artists, the American Water Color Society, and Allied Artists.

Her work did not appear in retrospective exhibitions after she died, but auction houses continued to find collectors willing to buy works that came on the market from time to time.

=== Artistic style ===
Olinsky signed her paintings, often using just her first name and on occasion using only her initials. She did not always give them titles and, when she did, she often simply identified the genre, as in "Still Life", or the dominant feature, as in "Red Apples". (Note: These are the titles given to the nine paintings Olinsky showed at the Lyme Art Association's annual in 1941: "Girl with a Straw Hat", "Flowers and Fruit", "Glimpse of the Hudson", "Straw Flowers", "Pears", "Flowers", "Poppies", "8th Ave. Local", and "Refugees".) She did not date her paintings.

Like the other members of the Lyme Art Association, Olinsky was a realist painter whose style had evolved from the American Impressionism of Childe Hassam, Guy C. Wiggins, and other Old Lyme artists of the early 20th century. Located between photographic exactitude, at one extreme, and nonobjective abstraction, on the other, this style, in company with her technique and choice of subjects, varied little during her career. In 1943, one reviewer grouped her with other National Academy artists who resisted innovation and showed no temptation to experiment, and, in 1958, another noted the limited scope of her work, praising her for attaining success within the relatively narrow boundaries that she had set for herself.

Her paintings rarely measured more than three feet in their largest dimension. She most frequently showed figure paintings, flower paintings, and still lifes and usually painted either in oil on canvas and board or in watercolor and gouache or tempera on paper.

Throughout her career, critics saw Olinsky as skilled in handling color. In 1930, Rochelle Brackman, in the Hartford Courant, wrote of her "honest seeking for true color" and, the same year, Elizabeth Belle Tyler, in the Springfield Daily Republican, discussed the "unusual charm" in one of her flower paintings. In 1943, a critic said a portrait of Olinsky's showed an "unerring sense of color" and in 1951 another described the colors in a flower painting as "beguiling".

Critics also credited Olinsky with skill in the composition of her paintings. In 1956, a reviewer said of a still life in one of the Lyme annuals, "Here we have one of the notable numbers of this season's showing. Here, linear organization, design, emphasis of mass have been used, all as a means toward the shaping of an expressive image—not exploited as ends in themselves."

In 1945, a critic commented on the solidity she achieved in her still life paintings and a few years later another critic noted a skill in handling spatial relationships. Commenting on her technique, a reviewer said her brushwork was meticulous in 1943.

Discussing works in tempera that she showed in 1944, the critic A.Z. Kruse drew attention to her "surety and briskness of touch" and another critic, Howard Devree, saw in the same paintings an "emotional approach" that conveyed Olinsky's personal reactions to her subjects.

== Personal life and family ==
Olinsky was born on March 11, 1909, in Florence. Her parents, Ivan Olinsky and Genevieve Karfunkle Olinsky, were both natives of the Russian Empire who had emigrated to the US and become naturalized US citizens. She had a sister, Leonore Olinsky, who was born in 1907 and died in 2001. During the 1920s and 1930s, she lived with her parents in an artists' cooperative studio building at 27 West 67th Street. In 1950, while traveling in Mexico, Olinsky married a writer named Charles Barteau. Olinsky died in her home in Old Lyme on June 15, 1984.
