= Eric Chenowith =

American basketball player (born 1979)

Personal information
- Born: March 9, 1979 (age 47) Orange County, California, U.S.
- Listed height: 7 ft 1 in (2.16 m)
- Listed weight: 270 lb (122 kg)

Career information
- High school: Villa Park (Villa Park, California)
- College: Kansas (1997–2001)
- NBA draft: 2001: 2nd round, 43rd overall pick
- Drafted by: New York Knicks
- Playing career: 2001–2008
- Position: Center
- Coaching career: 2009–2012

Career history

Playing
- 2001–2002: Greenville Groove
- 2002: Huntsville Flight
- 2002: Pau-Orthez
- 2002–2003: Huntsville Flight
- 2003: Roanoke Dazzle
- 2004: O.C. Crush
- 2005–2006: Idaho Stampede
- 2006: Cangrejeros de Santurce
- 2007: Cariduros de Fajardo
- 2008: Idaho Stampede

Coaching
- 2009–2012: Villa Park HS (assistant)

Career highlights
- NBA G League champion (2008); Second-team All-CBA (2006); French Basketball Cup champion (2002); Second-team All-Big 12 (1999); McDonald's All-American (1997)
- Stats at Basketball Reference

Eric Robert Chenowith (born March 9, 1979) is an American former professional basketball player.

As a high school player, he was selected to the McDonald's All-American Team in 1997. He played collegiately for Kansas and was drafted by the New York Knicks in the 2nd round (43rd overall pick) of the 2001 NBA draft.

Chenowith was under contract with the following NBA teams: the Knicks (June to September 2001), Sacramento Kings (October 2001), Seattle SuperSonics (September to October 2002), Los Angeles Clippers (October 2002), Los Angeles Lakers (August to October 2003), Denver Nuggets (October 2005), Chicago Bulls (October 2006) and New Orleans Hornets 2007. However, he never appeared in a reason-season NBA game (joining 7 other players from the 2001 NBA Draft to never play a game in the league).

Chenowith has played professionally for the Greenville Groove and Huntsville Flight (2001/02, NBDL), Pau-Orthez (2002, LNB, France), Huntsville Flight and Roanoke Dazzle (2002/03, NBDL), Orange County Crush (ABA) (2004/05), Idaho Stampede (CBA) and Cangrejeros de Santurce (Puerto-Rico) (2005/06), Idaho Stampede (NBDL) and Criollos de Caguas (Puerto-Rico) (2006/07).

He currently resides in Corona del Mar, Newport Beach. More recently he captained Team Chenowith to a second-place finish in the 2016 McDonald's All-American Legends and Stars portion of the Powerade Jam Fest at the historic Chicago Theatre home of the final Rat Pack concert.

In 2018, Chenowith founded Leverage Disability, a health and life insurance brokerage, in Irvine, California.
