= Ivan Olinsky =

Russian-American painter

Ivan Gregorewitch Olinsky (1 January 1878 – 11 February 1962) was a Russian-born American painter and art instructor.

== Biography ==
Olinsky was born in Yelisavetgrad, Russian Empire (now Kirovohrad, Ukraine). After immigrating to the United States at the age of twelve, he studied at the National Academy of Design, then worked for the American muralist George Willoughby Maynard, then for Elmer Garnsey, then for John La Farge in Boston until about 1906.

Olinsky became best known for his female portraits in a style that tended towards Impressionism. He was awarded full membership in the National Academy of Design in 1919, and served as an longtime instructor at the Art Students League of New York in Manhattan, New York City.

By 1942 he was living in New London, Connecticut. Olinsky suffered a stroke in December 1961, and he died on 11 February 1962.

== Legacy ==
His second daughter, Tosca Olinsky (1909–1984), was a notable painter in her own right. Both father and daughter are associated with the Old Lyme Art Colony in Old Lyme, Connecticut. Olinsky's papers reside at the Smithsonian.
