= Guy C. Wiggins =

American painter

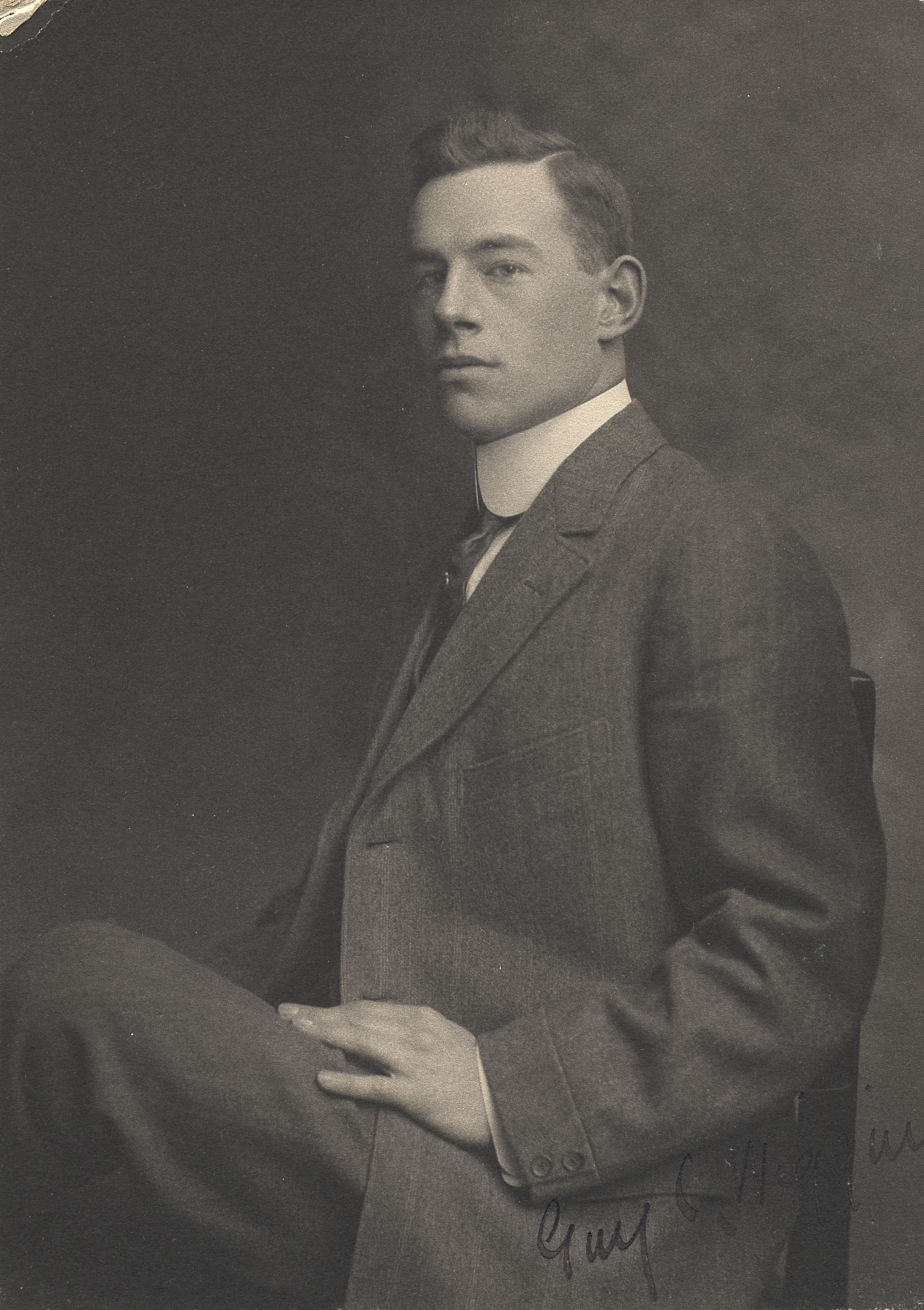
- Guy C. Wiggins, c. 1910
- Born: February 23, 1883; Brooklyn, New York City, U.S.
- Died: April 25, 1962 (aged 79); St. Augustine, Florida, U.S.
- Resting place: Old Lyme, Connecticut, U.S.
- Occupation: Painter
- Spouse: Dolores Gaxton
- Children: 2 sons, 1 daughter

Guy Carleton Wiggins NA (February 23, 1883 – April 25, 1962) was an American impressionist painter. He was the president of the Connecticut Academy of Fine Arts, and a member of the Old Lyme Art Colony. He did many paintings of New York City's snowy streets, landmarks and towering skyscrapers during winter.

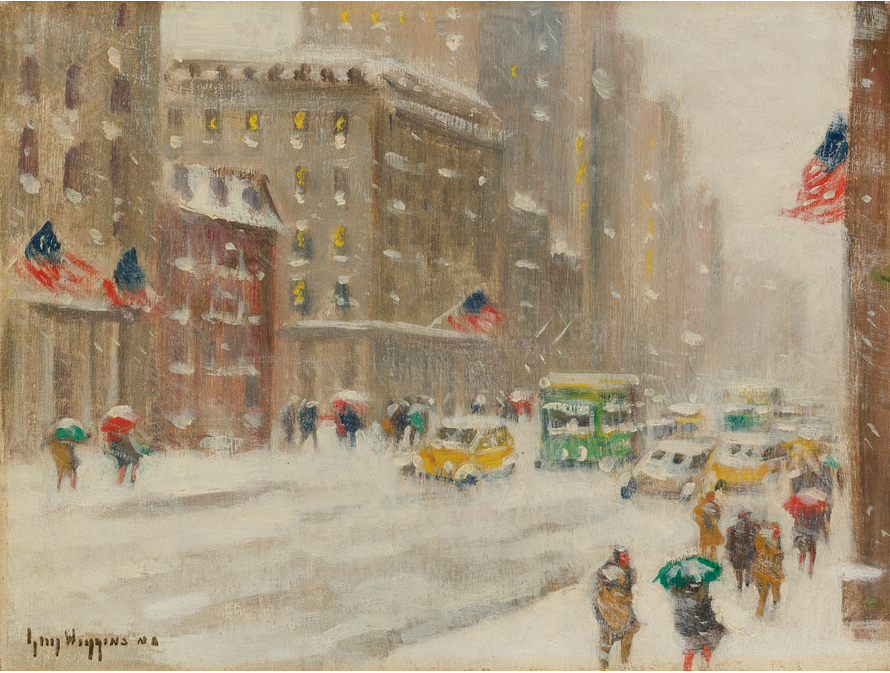
Fifth Avenue Storm.

== Early life ==
Wiggins was born on February 23, 1883, in Brooklyn. His father Carleton Wiggins was an accomplished artist who gave his son his first training as a painter. He attended the Brooklyn Polytechnic Institute, the Art Students League of New York, and the National Academy of Design.

== Career ==
Wiggins often painted scenes of New York City, as evident in The Metropolitan Tower (Metropolitan Museum of Art, New York); Washington Square in Winter (Richmond Art Museum, Indiana); Columbia Circle, Winter (National Gallery of Art, Washington); and Riverside Drive (1915).

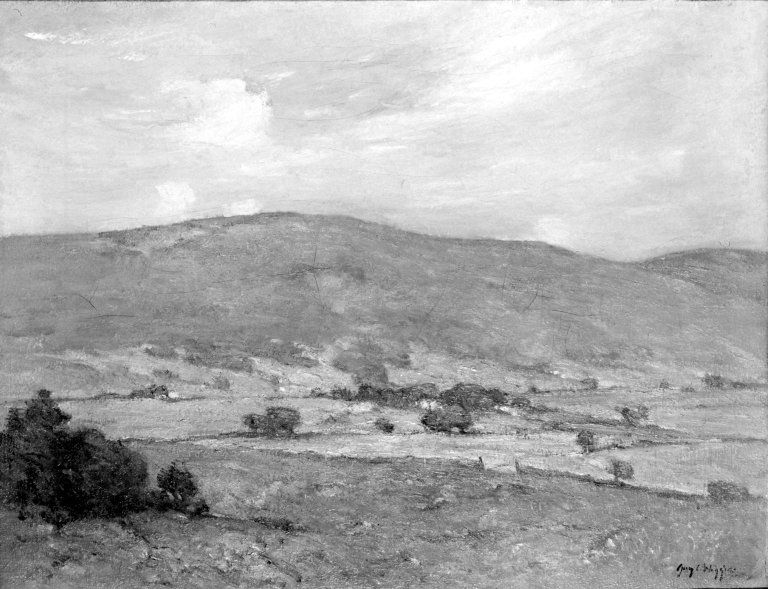
June, Berkshire Hills – Brooklyn Museum

Wiggins painted in an impressionistic style, as may be seen especially in Berkshire Hills, June (Brooklyn Museum). He traveled New England painting streams, fields and woodlands capturing on canvas the various seasons of the year. He became one of the youngest members of the Old Lyme Art Colony of Old Lyme, Connecticut, and painted alongside his father, Carleton, Childe Hassam, and Frank Vincent DuMond. Wiggins began teaching art in Essex, Connecticut, in 1937. He did a portrait of President Dwight D. Eisenhower and gave it to the White House in 1959.

Wiggins served as the president of the Connecticut Academy of Fine Arts. He was a member of the National Academy of Design, the New Haven Paint and Clay Club, and the Lyme Art Association. He won the Flagg Prize, the Cooper Prize and the Atheneum Prize from the Connecticut Academy of Fine Arts; the Harris Medal from the Art Institute of Chicago; the Turnbull Prize and the Isidor Prize from the Salmagundi Club; and the J. Francis Murphy Memorial Prize from the Rhode Island School of Design.

== Personal life, death and legacy ==
Wiggins married first Dorothy Johnson and later Dolores Gaxiola. With Dorothy he had two sons, Carleton Wiggins and Guy Arthur Wiggins, and a daughter, Dorothy Gibson. Wiggins resided in Old Lyme, Connecticut, and wintered in St. Augustine, Florida. Wiggins died in 1962 while on vacation in St. Augustine, Florida, aged 79. His body was returned home to Connecticut and he was buried in Old Lyme. His work can be seen in several major museums, including the Art Institute of Chicago, Brooklyn Museum, and Smithsonian American Art Museum.

Wiggins's son, Guy Arthur Wiggins (1920-2020), a painter, married, in 1959, to Dorothy Gittinger (née) Palmer. The couple remained wed for 61 years until his death in 2020 at age 100. They had three children, all boys, including his wife's son by her previous marriage whom Wiggins adopted.

== In popular culture ==
The painting "Lower Fifth Ave. During The Day" was the subject of a restoration by Julian Baumgartner on the YouTube Channel Baumgartner Restoration. The work was previously believed to be untitled, but during the restoration the true title was found painted on the verso after a layer of canvas from a previous restoration was removed.

The painting "Old Trinity, New York Winter" was the subject of a segment on the PBS program Antiques Roadshow in 2008. The owner said her father had purchased the painting in the late 1960s for $2500. An appraiser suggested the artwork would fetch between $50,000 and $80,000 at auction.

The painting is currently owned by former NYSE Board Member, Fred Hatfield (source MS Rau).
