= Carleton Wiggins =

American painter (1848–1932)

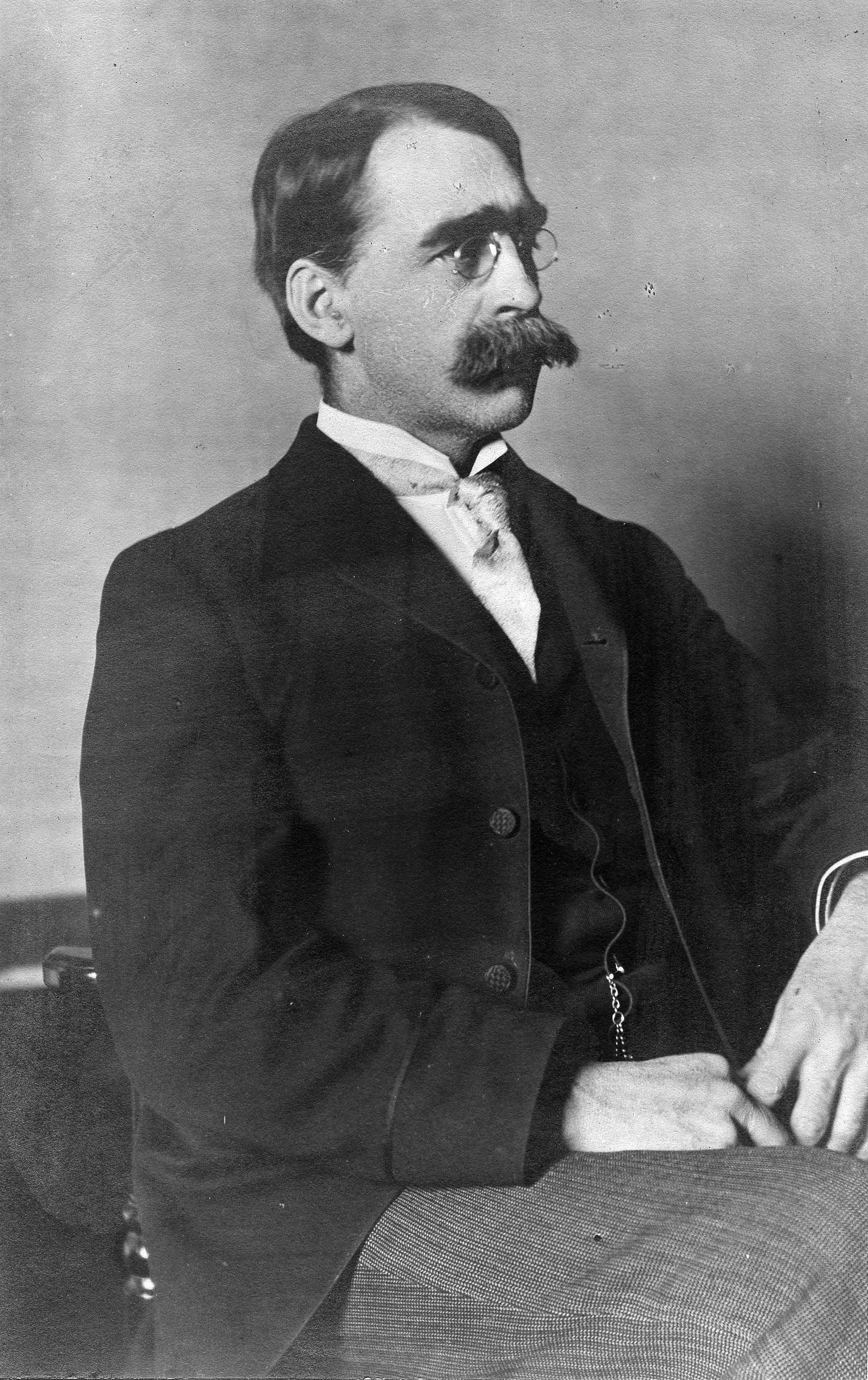
Carleton Wiggins

Carleton Wiggins NA (1848–1932) was an American landscape and cattle painter. He was born in Turner, Orange County, New York, and studied in New York at the National Academy of Design and with George Inness, and in Paris, and settled in New York. His landscapes were executed in broad flowing lines, with a rich low-toned color scheme, and often contain cattle, solidly and realistically portrayed.

== Biography ==
He was born in 1848. Wiggins frequented the Old Lyme Art Colony along with his son, painter Guy Carleton Wiggins, and was elected to the National Academy of Design in 1906. A member of the Salmagundi Club New York from 1883 until his death in 1932, he served as its president from 1911 to 1913.

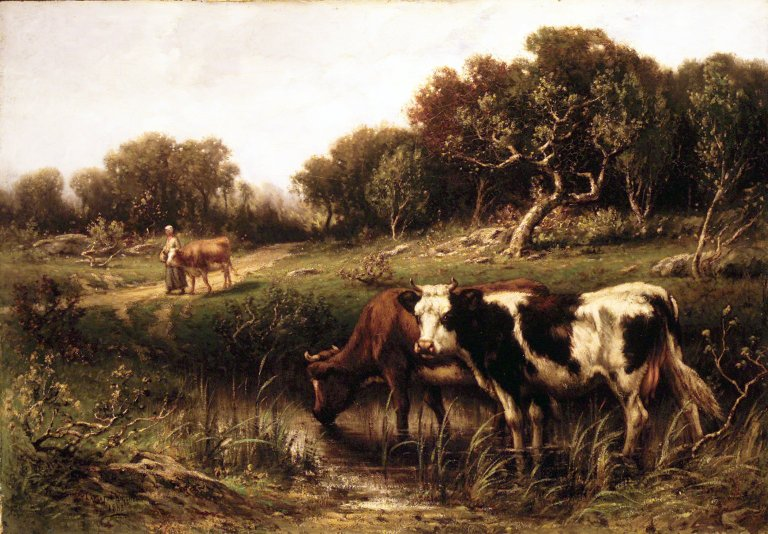
Cattle in a Pool

== Paintings ==
- "Young Holstein Bull" (Metropolitan Museum, New York)
- "Cattle in Pond" (Brooklyn Museum)
- "Sheep and Landscape" (Brooklyn Museum)
- "Lake and Mountains" (Art Institute, Chicago)
- "Moonrise on the Lake" (Art Institute, Chicago)
- "October" (Corcoran Art Gallery, Washington)
- "Evening after a Shower" (National Gallery, Washington)
- "The Plow Horse" (Lotos Club)
